= List of participants in the third Merkel cabinet coalition negotiations =

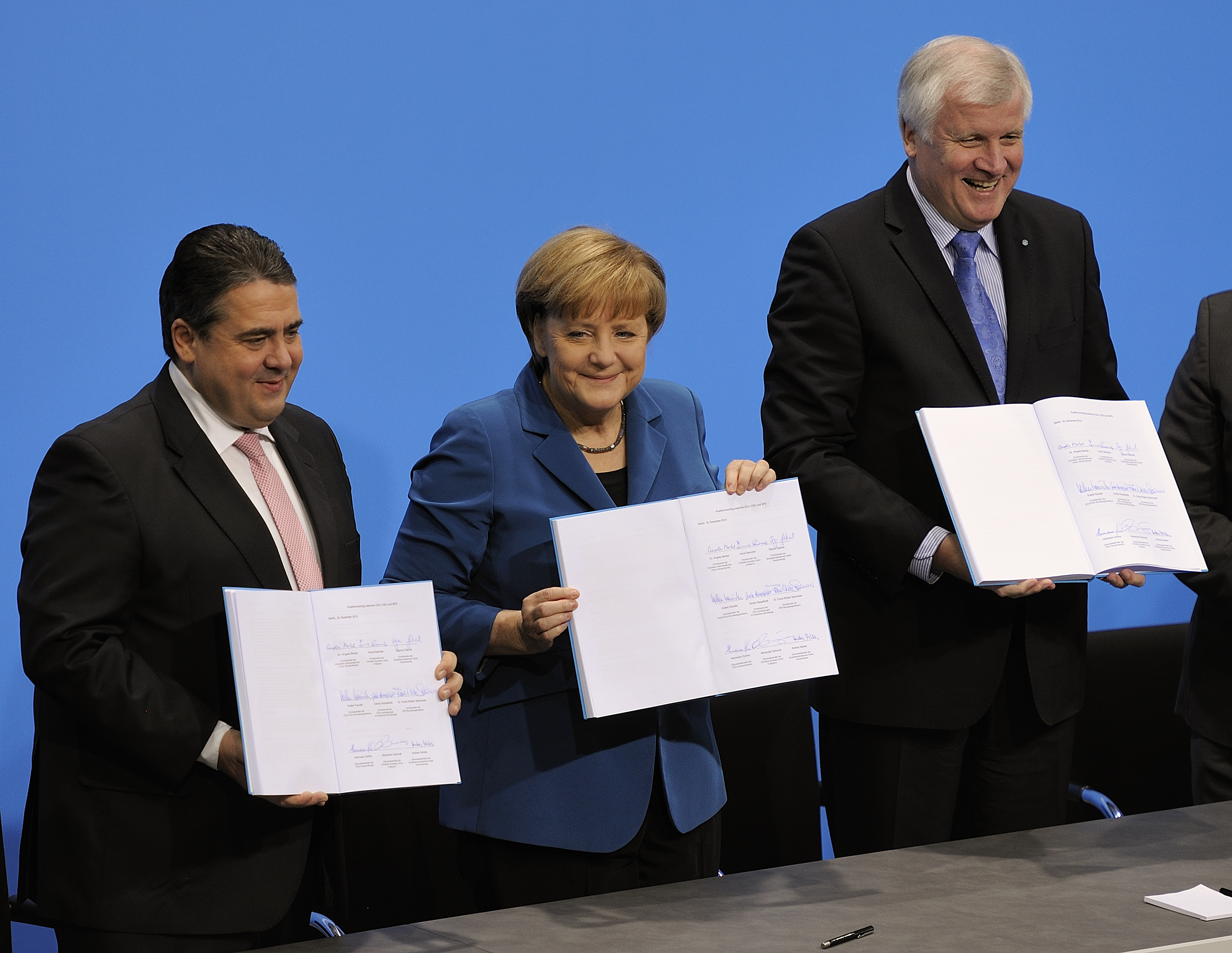
Signing of the coalition agreement for the 18th legislative period of the German Bundestag on 16 December 2013 in Berlin.

The list of participants in the 2013 coalition negotiations between the CDU/CSU and the SPD lists the individuals who took part in the coalition negotiations between the CDU/CSU and the SPD following the 2013 German federal election. The lists of participants were presented on 22 October. On 23 October 2013 the negotiations began, leading to the formation of a grand coalition (Third Merkel cabinet) on 17 December 2013. The committee memberships and activities as parliamentary state secretaries mentioned refer to the 17th legislative period of the German Bundestag.

== Small group ==
=== CDU ===
- Angela Merkel, CDU Chairwoman and Acting Chancellor
- Volker Kauder, Chairman of the CDU/CSU parliamentary group in the Bundestag
- Ronald Pofalla, Acting Federal Minister for Special Affairs, Head of the Federal Chancellery
- Hermann Gröhe, General Secretary of the CDU
- Volker Bouffier, Minister-President of Hesse, head of the CDU Hesse and deputy federal chairman of the CDU

=== CSU ===
- Horst Seehofer, CSU Chairman and Minister-president of Bavaria
- Gerda Hasselfeldt, Chair of the CSU state group in the Bundestag
- Barbara Stamm, President of the Landtag of Bavaria and Deputy Chairwoman of the CSU
- Alexander Dobrindt, General Secretary of the CSU

=== SPD ===
- Sigmar Gabriel, SPD Chairman
- Hannelore Kraft, Minister-President of Nordrhein-Westfalen, Chairwoman of SPD North Rhine-Westphalia and Deputy Chairwoman of the SPD
- Frank-Walter Steinmeier, Chairman of the SPD parliamentary group in the Bundestag
- Olaf Scholz, First Mayor of Hamburg, leader of the SPD Hamburg and deputy chairman of the SPD
- Andrea Nahles, General Secretary of the SPD
- Barbara Hendricks, Federal Treasurer of the SPD

== Large group ==
=== CDU ===
- Angela Merkel, CDU Chairwoman and Acting Chancellor
- Volker Kauder, Chairman of the CDU/CSU parliamentary group in the Bundestag
- Ronald Pofalla, Acting Federal Minister for Special Affairs and Head of the Federal Chancellery of Germany
- Hermann Gröhe, General Secretary of the CDU
- Volker Bouffier, Minister-President of Hesse, head of the Hessian CDU and deputy federal chairman of the CDU
- Julia Klöckner, Chairwoman of CDU Rhineland-Palatinate and Deputy Federal CDU Chairwoman
- Armin Laschet, Chairman of CDU North Rhine-Westphalia and deputy CDU federal chairman
- Ursula von der Leyen, acting Federal Minister for Labour and Social Affairs and Deputy Federal Chairwoman of the CDU
- Thomas Strobl, Chairman of CDU Baden-Württemberg and deputy CDU federal chairman
- Reiner Haseloff, Minister-President of Saxony-Anhalt
- Annegret Kramp-Karrenbauer, Minister-President of Saarland and Chairwoman of the CDU Saarland
- Christine Lieberknecht, Minister-President of Thuringia and Chairwoman of the CDU Thuringia
- Stanislaw Tillich,Minister-President of Saxony and Chairman of CDU Saxony
- Peter Altmaier, acting Federal Environment Minister
- Thomas de Maizière, acting Federal Minister of Defence
- Maria Böhmer, Minister of State at the Federal Chancellery and Federal Government Commissioner for Migration, Refugees and Integration
- Wolfgang Schäuble, acting Federal Minister of Finance
- Michael Kretschmer, deputy chairman of the CDU/CSU parliamentary group in the Bundestag and chairman of the Saxony state group of the CDU
- Katherina Reiche, Parliamentary State Secretary at the Federal Ministry for the Environment, Nature Conservation and Nuclear Safety
- Johanna Wanka, Acting Federal Minister of Research, Technology and Space
- Annette Widmann-Mauz, Parliamentary State Secretary in the Federal Ministry of Health
- Michael Grosse-Brömer, First Parliamentary Secretary of the CDU/CSU parliamentary group in the Bundestag
- Peter Hintze, Vice President of the German Bundestag
- Norbert Lammert, President of the Bundestag
- Karl-Josef Laumann, Chairman of the CDU parliamentary group in the Landtag of North Rhine-Westphalia
- Philipp Mißfelder, Federal Chairman of the Young Union and foreign policy spokesman of the CDU/CSU parliamentary group
- Herbert Reul, Chairman of the CDU/CSU Group in the European Parliament
- Jens Spahn, Health Policy Spokesperson of the CDU/CSU Parliamentary Group

=== CSU ===
- Horst Seehofer, CSU Chairman and Bavarian Minister-President
- Gerda Hasselfeldt, Chairwoman of the CSU parliamentary group in the German Bundestag
- Barbara Stamm, President of the Landtag of Bavaria and Deputy Chairwoman of the CSU
- Alexander Dobrindt, General Secretary of the CSU
- Beate Merk, Bavarian State Minister for European Affairs and Regional Relations and Deputy Chairwoman of the CSU
- Peter Ramsauer, acting Federal Minister of Transport and Deputy Chairman of the CSU
- Christian Schmidt, Parliamentary State Secretary at the Federal Ministry of Defence and Deputy Chairman of the CSU
- Hans-Peter Friedrich, Acting Federal Minister of the Interior and Acting Federal Minister for Food, Agriculture and Consumer Protection
- Ilse Aigner, Deputy Minister-President of Bavaria and Bavarian State Minister for Economic Affairs and Media, Energy and Technology
- Christine Haderthauer, Bavarian State Minister and Head of the Bavarian State Chancellery
- Thomas Kreuzer, parliamentary group leader of the CSU in the Landtag of Bavaria
- Gerd Müller, Parliamentary State Secretary in the Federal Ministry of Food, Agriculture and Consumer Protection
- Hartmut Koschyk, Parliamentary State Secretary in the Federal Ministry of Finance
- Andreas Scheuer, Parliamentary State Secretary at the Federal Ministry of Transport, Building and Urban Development
- Emilia Müller, Bavarian State Minister for Labour and Social Affairs, Family and Integration
- Dorothee Bär, Member of the Bundestag and Deputy General Secretary of the CSU
- Markus Söder, Bavarian State Minister of Finance, Regional Development and Home Affairs
- Joachim Herrmann, Bavarian State Minister of the Interior

=== SPD ===
- Sigmar Gabriel, SPD Chairman
- Hannelore Kraft, Minister-President of North Rhine-Westphalia, Chairwoman of the SPD North Rhine-Westphalia and Deputy Chairwoman of the SPD
- Frank-Walter Steinmeier, Chairman of the SPD parliamentary group in the Bundestag
- Olaf Scholz, First Mayor of Hamburg, head of the SPD Hamburg and deputy chairman of the SPD
- Andrea Nahles, General Secretary of the SPD
- Barbara Hendricks, Federal Treasurer of the SPD
- Thomas Oppermann, First Parliamentary Secretary of the SPD parliamentary group, Chairman of the Parliamentary Control Committee and Commissioner for Domestic Policy in the competence team of the failed SPD Chancellor candidate Peer Steinbrück
- Aydan Özoğuz, Deputy Federal Chairwoman of the SPD
- Martin Schulz, President of the European Parliament and European Affairs Officer of the SPD
- Manuela Schwesig, Minister for Labour, Equality and Social Affairs in Mecklenburg-Vorpommern, Deputy Federal Chairwoman of the SPD and Commissioner for Women's and Family Policy, Reconstruction East, Demography and Inclusion in the competence team of the failed SPD Chancellor candidate Peer Steinbrück
- Klaus Wowereit, Governing Mayor of Berlin and Deputy Chairman of the SPD
- Peer Steinbrück, former Federal Finance Minister and failed SPD Chancellor candidate
- Torsten Albig, Minister-President of Schleswig-Holstein
- Jens Böhrnsen, President of the Bremen Senate and Bremen Senator for Culture and Senator for Church Affairs
- Malu Dreyer, Minister-President of Rhineland-Palatinate
- Erwin Sellering, Minister-President of Mecklenburg-Vorpommern and Chairman of the SPD Mecklenburg-Vorpommern
- Stephan Weil, Minister-President of Lower Saxony and Chairman of the SPD Lower Saxony
- Dietmar Woidke, Minister-President of Brandenburg and Chairman of the SPD Brandenburg
- Katrin Budde, Chairwoman of the SPD parliamentary group in the Landtag of Saxony-Anhalt and Chairwoman of the SPD Saxony-Anhalt
- Martin Dulig, Chairman of the SPD parliamentary group in the Saxon State Parliament and Chairman of the SPD Saxony
- Thorsten Schäfer-Gümbel, Chairman of the SPD parliamentary group in the Hessian State Parliament, Chairman of the SPD Hesse and SPD candidate for the office of Hessian Minister-President
- Nils Schmid, Baden-Württemberg State Minister for Finance and Economics, Deputy Minister-President of Baden-Württemberg and Chairman of the SPD Baden-Württemberg
- Doris Ahnen, Rhineland-Palatinate State Minister for Education, Science, Continuing Education and Culture
- Ralf Stegner, chairman of the SPD parliamentary group in the Schleswig-Holstein state parliament and chairman of the SPD Schleswig-Holstein
- Florian Pronold, Chairman of the SPD Bavaria, Deputy Chairman of the SPD Parliamentary Group and Commissioner for Infrastructure and Housing in the competence team of the failed SPD Chancellor candidate Peer Steinbrück
- Ute Vogt, member of the Bundestag and former SPD leader in Baden-Württemberg
- Elke Ferner, Deputy Chairwoman of the SPD Parliamentary Group and Federal Chairwoman of the Working Group of Social Democratic Women
- Iris Gleicke, Parliamentary Managing Director of the SPD parliamentary group in the Bundestag
- Eva Högl, Member of the Bundestag
- Christine Lambrecht, Deputy Chairwoman of the SPD Parliamentary Group
- Brigitte Zypries, former Federal Minister of Justice, legal advisor to the SPD parliamentary group and commissioner for consumer protection in the competence team of the failed SPD chancellor candidate Peer Steinbrück

== Working groups ==
Twelve working groups and four sub-working groups were formed. Each working group was headed by a member of the CDU/CSU and a member of the SPD.

=== Foreign Affairs, Defence and Development Cooperation ===
Chairpersons: Thomas de Maizière (CDU) and Frank-Walter Steinmeier (SPD)

==== Other members ====
===== CDU =====
- Roderich Kiesewetter, Member of the Bundestag
- Philipp Mißfelder, Federal Chairman of the Young Union and foreign policy spokesman of the CDU/CSU parliamentary group
- Henning Otte, Member of the Bundestag
- Sibylle Pfeiffer, Vice Chair of the Bundestag Committee on Economic Cooperation and Development
- Andreas Schockenhoff, Deputy Chairman of the CDU/CSU Parliamentary Group
- Erika Steinbach, President of the Federation of Expellees and Spokesperson for Human Rights and Humanitarian Aid of the CDU/CSU Parliamentary Group
- Elmar Brok, Chairman of the Committee on Foreign Affairs of the European Parliament

===== CSU =====
- Christian Schmidt, Parliamentary State Secretary at the Federal Ministry of Defence and Deputy Chairman of the CSU
- Peter Gauweiler, Chairman of the Subcommittee on Foreign Cultural and Educational Policy of the Foreign Affairs Committee of the German Bundestag
- Johannes Hintersberger, State Secretary for Finance in the Bavarian State Cabinet
- Dagmar Wöhrl, Chairwoman of the Bundestag Committee on Economic Cooperation and Development

===== SPD =====
- Gernot Erler, Deputy Chairman of the SPD Parliamentary Group
- Rolf Mützenich, foreign policy spokesman of the SPD parliamentary group
- Rainer Arnold, defence policy spokesman for the SPD parliamentary group in the Bundestag
- Sascha Raabe, spokesman for the working group on economic cooperation and development of the SPD parliamentary group and member of the extended SPD parliamentary group executive committee
- Karin Evers-Meyer, former Federal Government Commissioner for Matters Relating to Persons with Disabilities and Member of the Bundestag
- Cornelia Füllkrug-Weitzel, President of "Brot für die Welt" and Diakonie Disaster Relief, Commissioner for Development Policy and Humanitarian Aid in the competence team of the failed SPD Chancellor candidate Peer Steinbrück
- Christoph Strässer, spokesperson for the working group on human rights and humanitarian aid of the SPD parliamentary group in the Bundestag

=== Finance, budget and federal-state (municipal) financial relations ===
Chairpersons: Wolfgang Schäuble (CDU) and Olaf Scholz (SPD)

==== Other members ====
===== CDU =====
- Norbert Barthle, Chairman of the Budget Working Group of the CDU/CSU Parliamentary Group
- Klaus-Peter Flosbach, Member of the Bundestag
- Michael Meister, Deputy Chairman of the CDU/CSU Parliamentary Group
- Christian von Stetten, member of the executive board of the CDU/CSU parliamentary group, spokesperson for small and medium-sized enterprises (SME) policy of the parliamentary group and chairman of the parliamentary group for SMEs of the CDU/CSU parliamentary group
- Thomas Schäfer, Finance Minister of Hesse
- Wolfgang Voß, Finance Minister of Thuringia
- Herbert Reul, Chairman of the CDU/CSU Group in the European Parliament

===== CSU =====
- Hartmut Koschyk, Parliamentary State Secretary in the Federal Ministry of Finance
- Bartholomäus Kalb, Member of the Bundestag
- Markus Söder, Bavarian State Minister of Finance, Regional Development and Home Affairs

===== SPD =====
- Joachim Poß, Deputy Chairman of the SPD Parliamentary Group
- Carsten Schneider, budget policy spokesman of the SPD parliamentary group in the Bundestag
- Carsten Kühl, Finance Minister of Rhineland-Palatinate
- Norbert Walter-Borjans, Finance Minister of North Rhine-Westphalia
- Barbara Ludwig, Mayor of Chemnitz
- Sabine Bätzing-Lichtenthäler, Member of the Bundestag and former Drug Commissioner of the Federal Government

==== Sub-working group on banking regulation, Europe, Euro ====
Chairpersons: Herbert Reul (CDU) and Martin Schulz (SPD)

===== Other members =====
====== CDU ======
- Peter Hintze, Vice President of the German Bundestag
- Michael Meister, Deputy Chairman of the CDU/CSU Parliamentary Group
- Michael Stübgen, Head of the Working Group on European Union Affairs of the CDU/CSU Parliamentary Group

====== CSU ======
- Thomas Silberhorn, Chairman of the Working Group on Foreign Affairs, Defense, Europe, Economic Cooperation and Development, Human Rights and Humanitarian Aid of the CSU State Group in the German Bundestag
- Markus Söder, Bavarian State Minister of Finance, Regional Development and Home Affairs
- Beate Merk, Bavarian State Minister for European Affairs and Regional Relations and Deputy Chairwoman of the CSU
- Markus Ferber, Chairman of the CSU European Group in the European Parliament

====== SPD ======
- Lothar Binding, Member of the Bundestag
- Udo Bullmann, economic policy spokesperson for the Social Democratic Group in the European Parliament for economic and monetary affairs
- Axel Schäfer, Deputy Chairman of the SPD Parliamentary Group
- Johannes Kahrs, spokesman of the Seeheimer Kreis of the SPD parliamentary group, chairman of the German-Turkish parliamentary group of the German Bundestag and commissioner for the concerns of lesbians and gays in the SPD parliamentary group.

=== Business ===
Chairpersons : Ilse Aigner (CSU) and Hubertus Heil (SPD, Deputy Chairperson of the SPD Parliamentary Group)

==== Other members ====
===== CDU =====
- Michael Fuchs, Chairman of the Parliamentary Group for Small and Medium-Sized Businesses of the CDU/CSU Parliamentary Group in the Bundestag
- Steffen Kampeter, Parliamentary State Secretary at the Federal Ministry of Finance
- Joachim Pfeiffer, economic policy spokesman of the CDU/CSU parliamentary group
- David McAllister, former Minister-President of Lower Saxony and Chairman of the CDU Lower Saxony
- Mike Mohring, chairman of the CDU parliamentary group in the Landtag of Thuringia
- Hartmut Möllring, Minister for Science and Economy of the State of Saxony-Anhalt
- Cornelia Yzer, Senator for Economics, Technology and Research in the Senate of Berlin

===== CSU =====
- Hans Michelbach, Chairman of the CDU/CSU parliamentary group in the Finance Committee of the German Bundestag
- Ulrich Lange, Member of the Bundestag

===== SPD =====
- Wolfgang Tiefensee, former Federal Minister for Transport, Building and Urban Development and economic policy spokesman of the SPD parliamentary group
- Matthias Machnig, Minister of Economic Affairs of Thuringia and Commissioner for Environmental and Energy Policy in the competence team of the failed SPD chancellor candidate Peer Steinbrück
- Rita Schwarzelühr-Sutter, Member of the Bundestag, SPD parliamentary group's representative for small and medium-sized enterprises (SMEs) and skilled trades
- Andrea Wicklein, representative of the SPD parliamentary group for small and medium-sized enterprises/freelance professions
- Garrelt Duin, Minister for Economic Affairs, Energy, Industry, Small and Medium-Sized Enterprises and Trade in North Rhine-Westphalia
- Nils Schmid, Baden-Württemberg State Minister for Finance and Economics, Deputy Minister-President of Baden-Württemberg and Chairman of the SPD Baden-Württemberg

=== Energy ===
Chairpersons: Peter Altmaier (CDU) and Hannelore Kraft (SPD)

==== Other members ====
===== CDU =====
- Thomas Bareiß, Coordinator for Energy Policy of the CDU/CSU Parliamentary Group
- Maria Flachsbarth, Commissioner for Churches and Religious Communities of the CDU/CSU parliamentary group and Chairwoman of the Parliamentary Inquiry Committee on the Gorleben Exploratory Mine
- Andreas Jung, Chairman of the Parliamentary Advisory Council for Sustainable Development in the Bundestag
- Ingbert Liebing, spokesperson for local government policy of the CDU/CSU parliamentary group in the Bundestag
- Frank Kupfer, Saxon State Minister for the Environment and Agriculture
- Armin Laschet, chairman of CDU North Rhine-Westphalia and deputy CDU federal chairman

===== CSU =====
- Georg Nüßlein, energy policy spokesman for the CSU parliamentary group in the Bundestag
- Josef Göppel, Chairman of the CDU/CSU parliamentary group in the Committee on the Environment, Nature Conservation and Nuclear Safety
- Franz Josef Pschierer, State Secretary in the Bavarian Ministry of Economic Affairs

===== SPD =====
- Thorsten Schäfer-Gümbel, Chairman of the SPD parliamentary group in the Hessian State Parliament, Chairman of the SPD Hesse and SPD candidate for the office of Hessian Minister-President
- Stephan Weil, Minister-President of Lower Saxony and Chairman of the SPD Lower Saxony
- Heiko Maas, Saarland Minister for Economic Affairs, Labour, Transport and Energy and Deputy Minister-President
- Peter Friedrich, Minister for Federal Council, Europe and International Affairs in Baden-Württemberg
- Nina Scheer, Member of the Bundestag
- Dietmar Woidke, Minister-President of Brandenburg and Chairman of the SPD Brandenburg

=== Work and Social Affairs ===
Chairpersons: Ursula von der Leyen (CDU) and Andrea Nahles (SPD)

==== Other members ====
===== CDU =====
- Ralf Brauksiepe, Parliamentary State Secretary at the Federal Ministry of Labour and Social Affairs
- Hans-Joachim Fuchtel, Parliamentary State Secretary at the Federal Ministry of Labour and Social Affairs and Commissioner of the Federal Chancellor for Greece
- Carsten Linnemann, Chairman of the SME and Economic Association of the CDU/CSU
- Karl Schiewerling, Chairman of the Working Group “Labor and Social Affairs” of the CDU/CSU parliamentary group and labor market and social policy spokesman of the CDU/CSU parliamentary group and deputy federal chairman of the Christian Democratic Employees' Association
- Gerald Weiß, Chairman of the Hesse State Association of the Christian Democratic Employees' Association and Deputy Federal Chairman of the Christian Democratic Employees' Association
- Rainer Robra, Minister für Europa- und Medienangelegenheiten von Sachsen-Anhalt

===== CSU =====
- Max Straubinger, deputy chairman of the CSU parliamentary group in the Bundestag
- Paul Lehrieder, Member of the Bundestag
- Emilia Müller, Bavarian State Minister for Labour and Social Affairs, Family and Integration

===== SPD =====
- Anette Kramme, spokesperson for the SPD parliamentary group in the Bundestag for the area of labor and social affairs
- Erwin Sellering, Minister-President of Mecklenburg-Vorpommern and Chairman of the SPD Mecklenburg-Vorpommern
- Guntram Schneider, Minister for Labour, Integration and Social Affairs of the State of North Rhine-Westphalia
- Gabriele Lösekrug-Möller, Member of the Bundestag
- Detlef Scheele, Hamburg Senator for Labour, Social Affairs, Family and Integration
- Klaus Wiesehügel, former federal chairman of the IG Bauen-Agrar-Umwelt (Construction, Agriculture and Environment Union) and commissioner for labor and social affairs in the competence team of the failed SPD chancellor candidate Peer Steinbrück
- Armin Schild, district manager of the IG Metall district of Central Germany and member of the SPD federal executive committee

=== Family, women and equality policy ===
Chairpersons: Annette Widmann-Mauz (CDU) and Manuela Schwesig (SPD)

==== Other members ====
===== CDU =====
- Ingrid Fischbach, Deputy Chairwoman of the CDU/CSU Parliamentary Group
- Markus Grübel, Member of the Bundestag
- Katharina Landgraf, Member of the Bundestag
- Sabine Weiss, Member of the Bundestag and Member of the CDU Federal Executive Committee
- Elisabeth Winkelmeier-Becker, Member of the Bundestag
- Andreas Storm, Minister for Social Affairs, Health, Women and Family in Saarland

===== CSU =====
- Dorothee Bär, Deputy General Secretary of the CSU
- Daniela Ludwig, Chairwoman of the CDU/CSU parliamentary group in the Legal Affairs Committee of the Bundestag
- Kerstin Schreyer-Stäblein, Member of the Landtag of Bavaria

===== SPD =====
- Dagmar Ziegler, deputy chairwoman of the parliamentary group, chairman of the SPD parliamentary group
- Caren Marks, spokesperson for the working group on family, senior citizens, women and youth of the SPD parliamentary group
- Kerstin Griese, Commissioner of the SPD parliamentary group for churches and religious communities
- Elke Ferner, Deputy Chairwoman of the SPD Parliamentary Group and Federal Chairwoman of the Working Group of Social Democratic Women
- Martin Dulig, Chairman of the SPD parliamentary group in the Saxon State Parliament and Chairman of the SPD Saxony
- Eva Högl, Member of the Bundestag

=== Health and Care ===
Chairpersons: Jens Spahn (CDU) and Karl Lauterbach (SPD), spokesperson for the working group on health of the SPD parliamentary group and commissioner for health in the competence team of the failed SPD chancellor candidate Peer Steinbrück)

==== Other members ====
===== CDU =====
- Emine Demirbüken-Wegner, State Secretary for Health in the Senate Department for Health and Social Affairs Berlin and member of the CDU Presidium
- Hubert Hüppe, Federal Government Commissioner for Matters Relating to Persons with Disabilities
- Maria Michalk, Member of the Bundestag and Member of the CDU Federal Executive Committee
- Christine Clauß, Saxony State Minister for Social Affairs and Consumer Protection
- Karl-Josef Laumann, Chairman of the CDU parliamentary group in the Landtag of North Rhine-Westphalia
- Michael Schierack, Chairman of the CDU Brandenburg

===== CSU =====
- Johannes Singhammer, Vice President of the German Bundestag
- Stephan Stracke, Member of the Bundestag
- Melanie Huml, Bavarian State Minister for Health and Care

===== SPD =====
- Carola Reimann, Chairwoman of the Health Committee of the German Bundestag
- Cornelia Prüfer-Storcks, Senator for Health and Consumer Protection in Hamburg
- Kristin Alheit, Minister for Social Affairs, Health, Family and Equality in Schleswig-Holstein
- Alexander Schweitzer, Minister of Social Affairs of Rhineland-Palatinate
- Hilde Mattheis, Chairwoman of the Working Group on Distributive Justice and Social Integration of the SPD Parliamentary Group
- Günter Baaske, Minister for Labour, Social Affairs, Women and Family in Brandenburg

=== Transport, construction and infrastructure ===
Chairpersons: Peter Ramsauer (CSU) and Florian Pronold (SPD)

==== Other members ====
===== CDU =====
- Enak Ferlemann, Parliamentary State Secretary at the Federal Ministry of Transport, Building and Urban Development
- Steffen Bilger, Member of the Bundestag
- Dirk Fischer, transport policy spokesperson for the CDU/CSU parliamentary group
- Thomas Jarzombek, Member of the Bundestag
- Arnold Vaatz, Deputy Chairman of the CDU/CSU parliamentary group
- Christian Carius, Minister for Construction, Regional Development and Transport in Thuringia

===== CSU =====
- Andreas Scheuer, Parliamentary State Secretary at the Federal Ministry of Transport, Building and Urban Development
- Gerhard Eck, State Secretary in the Bavarian State Ministry of the Interior

===== SPD =====
- Sören Bartol, spokesperson for the working group on transport, construction and urban development of the SPD parliamentary group in the Bundestag
- Michael Groschek, Minister for Construction, Housing, Urban Development and Transport in North Rhine-Westphalia
- Torsten Albig, Minister-President of Schleswig-Holstein
- Iris Gleicke, Parliamentary Managing Director of the SPD parliamentary group in the Bundestag
- Jutta Blankau, Senator for Urban Development and Environment in Hamburg
- Olaf Lies, Minister for Economic Affairs, Labour and Transport in Lower Saxony

=== Science, education and research ===
Chairpersons: Johanna Wanka (CDU) and Doris Ahnen (SPD)

==== Other members ====
===== CDU =====
- Helge Braun, Parliamentary State Secretary at the Federal Ministry of Education and Research
- Philipp Murmann, Member of the Bundestag
- Thomas Rachel, Parliamentary State Secretary at the Federal Ministry of Education and Research
- Uwe Schummer, Chairman of the CDU/CSU parliamentary group for education and research
- Marcus Weinberg, Chairman of the CDU Hamburg
- Sabine von Schorlemer, State Minister for Science and Art in Saxony

===== CSU =====
- Albert Rupprecht, Chairman of the Working Group on Education and Research of the CDU/CSU Parliamentary Group
- Florian Hahn, Member of the Bundestag
- Ludwig Spaenle, Bavarian State Minister for Education and Cultural Affairs

===== SPD =====
- Christoph Matschie, Chairman of the SPD Thuringia and Minister of Education of Thuringia
- Ernst Dieter Rossmann, spokesperson for the working group on education and research of the SPD parliamentary group in the Bundestag
- Swen Schulz, member of the executive committee of the SPD parliamentary group in the Bundestag
- Jens Böhrnsen, President of the Bremen Senate and Bremen Senator for Culture and Senator for Church Affairs
- René Röspel, Member of the Bundestag
- Ralf Stegner, chairman of the SPD parliamentary group in the Schleswig-Holstein state parliament and chairman of the SPD Schleswig-Holstein

=== Interior and Justice ===
Chairpersons: Hans-Peter Friedrich (CSU) and Thomas Oppermann (SPD)

==== Other members ====
===== CDU =====
- Maria Böhmer, Minister of State at the Federal Chancellery and Federal Government Commissioner for Migration, Refugees and Integration
- Wolfgang Bosbach, Chairman of the Committee on Internal Affairs of the German Bundestag
- Günter Krings, Deputy Chairman of the CDU/CSU Parliamentary Group
- Ole Schröder, Parliamentary State Secretary at the Federal Ministry of the Interior
- Thomas Strobl, chairman of the CDU Baden-Württemberg and deputy CDU federal chairman
- Lorenz Caffier, Minister of the Interior of Mecklenburg-Vorpommern and Chairman of the CDU Mecklenburg-Vorpommern
- Frank Henkel, Senator for the Interior and Sport of Berlin and Chairman of the CDU Berlin

===== CSU =====
- Hans-Peter Uhl, Chairman of the Working Group on Domestic Policy of the CDU/CSU Parliamentary Group
- Joachim Herrmann, Bavarian State Minister of the Interior
- Winfried Bausback, Bavarian State Minister of Justice

===== SPD =====
- Ralf Jäger, Minister for the Interior and Municipal Affairs of North Rhine-Westphalia
- Christine Lambrecht, Deputy Chairwoman of the SPD Parliamentary Group
- Angela Kolb-Janssen, Minister of Justice of Saxony-Anhalt
- Boris Pistorius, Interior Minister of Lower Saxony
- Michael Hartmann, domestic policy spokesman of the SPD parliamentary group
- Burkhard Lischka, Member of the Bundestag

==== Sub-working group on integration and migration ====
Chairpersons: Maria Böhmer (CDU) and Aydan Özoğuz (SPD)

==== Weitere Mitglieder ====
===== CDU =====
- Wolfgang Bosbach, Chairman of the Committee on Internal Affairs of the German Bundestag
- Reinhard Grindel, Member of the Bundestag
- Aygül Özkan, former Minister for Social Affairs, Women, Family, Health and Integration of Lower Saxony
- Markus Ulbig, Saxony State Minister of the Interior

===== CSU =====
- Stephan Mayer, Chairman of the Working Group on Internal Affairs, Law, Sport and Voluntary Service, Culture and Media of the CSU State Group in the Bundestag
- Martin Neumeyer, Integration Commissioner of the Bavarian State Government

===== SPD =====
- Andreas Breitner, Interior Minister of Schleswig-Holstein
- Carola Veit, Präsidentin der Hamburgischen Bürgerschaft
- Yasemin Karakaşoğlu, Commissioner for Education and Science in the competence team of the failed SPD chancellor candidate Peer Steinbrück

=== Environment and agriculture ===
Chairpersons: Katherina Reiche (CDU) and Ute Vogt (SPD)

==== Other members ====
===== CDU =====
- Peter Bleser, Parliamentary State Secretary in the Federal Ministry of Food, Agriculture and Consumer Protection
- Marie-Luise Dött, Chairwoman of the Working Group on Environment, Nature Conservation and Reactor Safety of the CDU/CSU Parliamentary Group and Environmental Policy Spokesperson of the CDU/CSU Parliamentary Group
- Mechthild Heil, Consumer Protection Officer of the CDU/CSU parliamentary group
- Franz-Josef Holzenkamp, Member of the Bundestag
- Julia Klöckner, Chairwoman of the CDU Rhineland-Palatinate and Deputy Federal CDU Chairwoman
- Lucia Puttrich, Environment Minister of Hesse
- Jürgen Reinholz, Minister for Agriculture, Nature Conservation and Environment of Thuringia

===== CSU =====
- Marlene Mortler, State Chairwoman of the CSU's Working Group on Agriculture
- Gerd Müller, Parliamentary State Secretary in the Federal Ministry of Food, Agriculture and Consumer Protection
- Helmut Brunner, Bavarian State Minister for Food, Agriculture and Forestry
- Marcel Huber, Bavarian State Minister for the Environment and Health

===== SPD =====
- Till Backhaus, Minister of Agriculture of Mecklenburg-Vorpommern
- Bärbel Kofler, Member of the Bundestag
- Matthias Miersch, environmental policy spokesperson for the SPD parliamentary group in the Bundestag
- Anke Rehlinger, Saarland Minister of Justice and Minister for the Environment and Consumer Protection
- Wilhelm Priesmeier, spokesperson for the working group on food, agriculture and consumer protection of the SPD parliamentary group in the Bundestag
- Katrin Budde, Chairwoman of the SPD parliamentary group in the Landtag of Saxony-Anhalt and Chairwoman of the SPD Saxony-Anhalt
- Ulrich Kelber, Deputy Chairman of the SPD Parliamentary Group for Environment, Energy and Consumer Protection

==== Sub-working group on consumer protection ====
Chairpersons: Mechthild Heil (CDU) and Ulrich Kelber (SPD, Deputy Chairperson of the SPD Parliamentary Group)

===== Other members =====
====== CDU ======
- Alois Gerig, Member of the Bundestag
- Peter Liese, Member of the European Parliament, Chairman of the EPP Group's Working Group on Bioethics
- Julia Klöckner, Chairwoman of the CDU Rhineland-Palatinate
- Lucia Puttrich, Environment Minister of Hesse

====== CSU ======
- Gerd Müller, Parliamentary State Secretary in the Federal Ministry of Food, Agriculture and Consumer Protection
- Marcel Huber, Bavarian State Minister for the Environment and Health

====== SPD ======
- Jochen Hartloff, Minister of Justice and Consumer Protection of Rhineland-Palatinate
- Elvira Drobinski-Weiß, Member of the Bundestag
- Dirk Becker, Member of the Bundestag

=== Culture and Media ===
Chairpersons: Michael Kretschmer and Klaus Wowereit.

==== Other members ====
===== CDU =====
- Monika Grütters, Chairwoman of the Bundestag Committee on Culture and Media
- Ansgar Heveling, Member of the Bundestag
- Norbert Lammert, President of the Bundestag
- Peter Tauber, Member of the Bundestag
- Marco Wanderwitz, chairman of the young group in the CDU/CSU parliamentary group
- Doris Pack, chair of the Committee on Culture and Education of the European Parliament

===== CSU =====
- Thomas Goppel, Member of the Landtag of Bavaria
- Dorothee Bär, Member of the Bundestag and Deputy General Secretary of the CSU
- Michael Frieser, Member of the Bundestag

===== SPD =====
- Barbara Kisseler, Senator for Culture in the Hamburg Senate
- Siegmund Ehrmann, cultural policy spokesperson for the SPD parliamentary group in the German Bundestag
- Oliver Scheytt, Commissioner for Art and Culture in the competence team of the failed SPD chancellor candidate Peer Steinbrück
- Julian Nida-Rümelin, former Minister of State for Culture
- Stephan Dorgerloh, Minister of Education of Saxony-Anhalt
- Malu Dreyer, Minister-President of Rhineland-Palatinate
- Marc Jan Eumann, State Secretary at the Ministry for Federal Affairs, Europe and Media of the State of North Rhine-Westphalia

==== Sub-working group Digital Agenda ====
Chairpersons: Dorothee Bär (CSU) and Brigitte Zypries (SPD)

===== Other members =====
====== CDU ======
- Peter Tauber, Member of the Bundestag
- Ansgar Heveling, Member of the Bundestag
- Nadine Schön, Member of the Bundestag
- Andreas Lämmel, Member of the Bundestag
- Thomas Heilmann, Berlin Senator for Justice and Consumer Protection

====== CSU ======
- Markus Blume, Chairman of the CSU Economic Commission.
- Reinhard Brandl, Member of the Bundestag.

====== SPD ======
- Gesche Joost, Commissioner for Networked Society in the competence team of the failed SPD chancellor candidate Peer Steinbrück
- Lars Klingbeil, Member of the Bundestag
- Björn Böhning, Head of the Berlin Senate Chancellery

== Sources ==
- Mitglieder der großen Runde (PDF; 61 kB) auf cdu.de
- Organigramm der Koalitionsverhandlungen (PDF; 122 kB) auf cdu.de
- Besetzung der Koalitions-Arbeitsgruppen (PDF; 23 kB) auf cdu.de
