= Cabinet Seehofer =

Cabinet Seehofer is the name of either of two cabinets in the German state of Bavaria led by Horst Seehofer:

- Cabinet Seehofer I (2008–2013)
- Cabinet Seehofer II (2013–2018)
