= Cabinet Seehofer I =

First Cabinet of Horst Seehofer Cabinet Seehofer- I
- 24th Cabinet of Bavaria
- 30 October 2008 – 10 October 2013
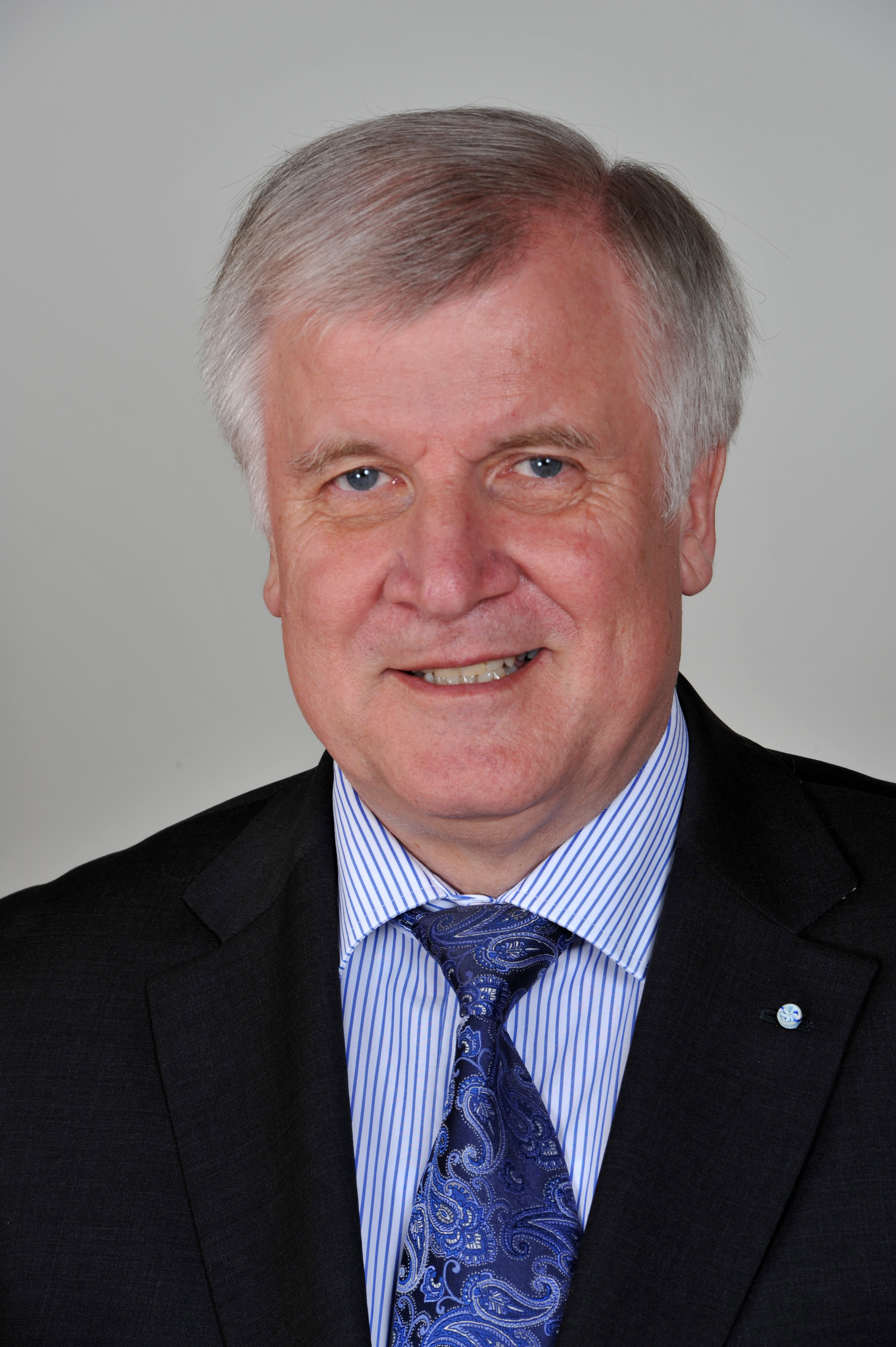
- Date formed: 30 October 2008
- Date dissolved: 10 October 2013 (4 years, 11 months, 1 week and 3 days)

People and organisations
- Minister President: Horst Seehofer
- Deputy Minister President: Martin Zeil
- Member party: Christian Social Union; Free Democratic Party
- Status in legislature: Coalition government (Majority)
- Opposition party: Social Democratic Party; Free Voters; The Greens

History
- Election: 2008 Bavarian state election
- Legislature term: 16th Landtag
- Predecessor: Beckstein
- Successor: Seehofer II

The Cabinet Seehofer I was the state government of the German state of Bavaria from 30 October 2008 to 10 October 2013. The Cabinet was headed by Minister President Horst Seehofer and was formed by a coalition of the Christian Social Union and the Free Democratic Party. It was replaced by the Cabinet Seehofer II. Cabinet members hold the office of Ministers of their respective portfolio, except denoted otherwise.

== Composition ==
Portfolio	Minister	Took office	Left office	Party
Minister President	Horst Seehofer	30 October 2008	10 October 2013	CSU
Deputy Minister President & Minister of Economics, Infrastructure, Transport and Technology	Martin Zeil	30 October 2008	10 October 2013	FDP
Minister of Interior	Joachim Herrmann	30 October 2008	10 October 2013	CSU
Minister of Justice and Consumer Protection	Beate Merk	10 October 2013	20 March 2018	CSU
Minister of Finance	Georg Fahrenschon	30 October 2008	4 November 2011	CSU
Minister of Finance	Markus Söder	4 November 2011	10 October 2013	CSU
Minister of Environment and Health	Markus Söder	30 October 2008	4 September 2011	CSU
Minister of Environment and Health	Marcel Huber	4 September 2011	10 October 2013	CSU
Minister of School and Education	Ludwig Spaenle	30 October 2008	10 October 2013	CSU
Minister of Science, Research and Culture	Wolfgang Heubisch	30 October 2008	10 October 2013	FDP
Minister of Food, Agriculture and Forestry	Helmut Brunner	10 October 2013	20 March 2018	CSU
Minister of Labor, Social Affairs, Families, and Women	Christine Haderthauer	10 October 2013	20 March 2018	CSU
Minister of Federal and European Affairs	Emilia Müller	10 October 2013	20 March 2018	CSU
State Chancellery	Siegfried Schneider	30 October 2008	17 March 2011	CSU
State Chancellery	Marcel Huber	17 March 2011	4 November 2011	CSU
State Chancellery	Thomas Kreuzer	4 November 2011	10 October 2013	CSU
