= Cabinet Seehofer II =

Second Cabinet of Horst Seehofer Cabinet Seehofer II
- 25th Cabinet of Bavaria
- 10 October 2013 – 20 March 2018
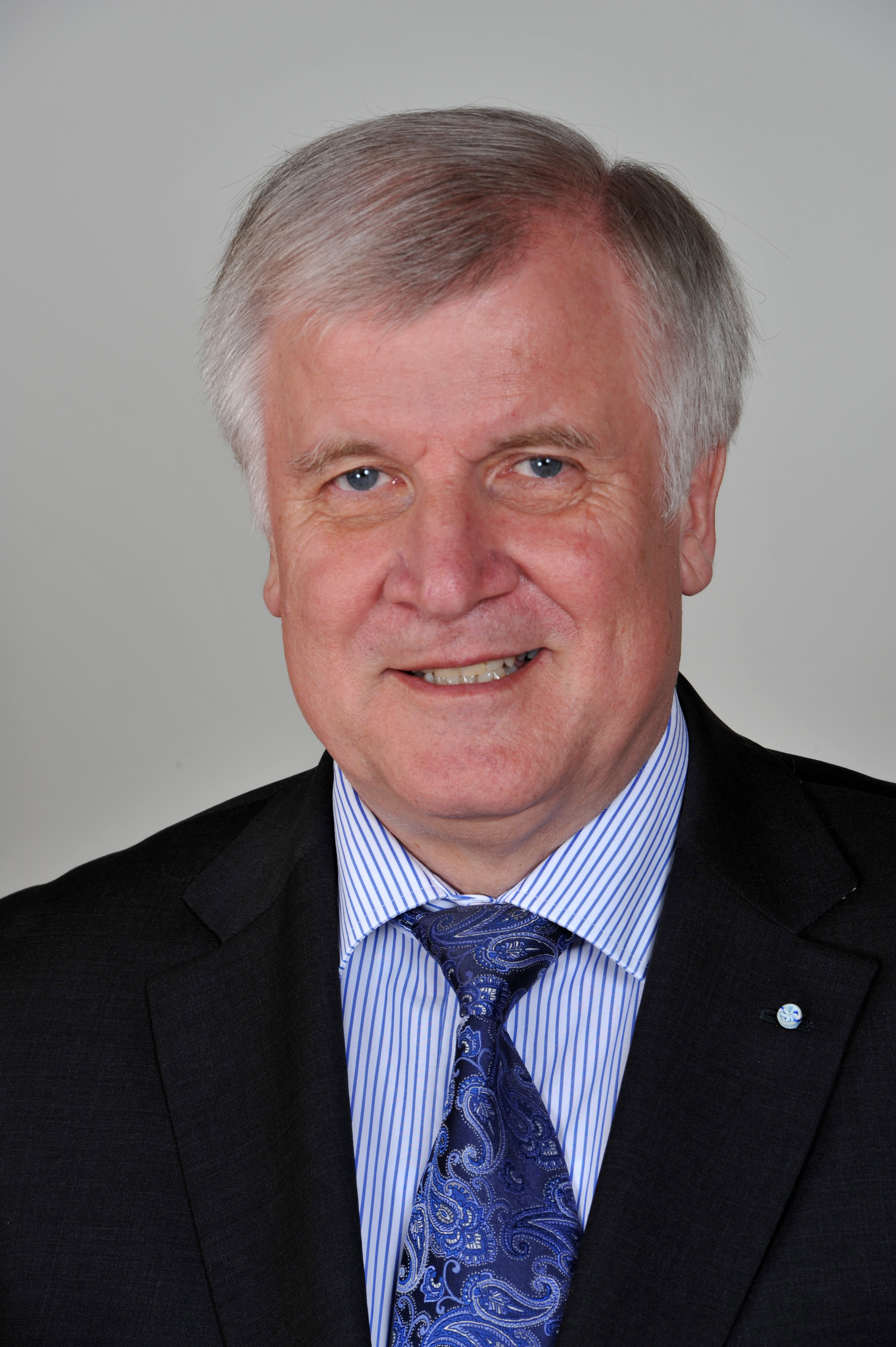
- Date formed: 10 October 2013
- Date dissolved: 20 March 2018 (4 years, 5 months, 1 week and 3 days)

People and organisations
- Minister President: Horst Seehofer
- Deputy Minister President: Ilse Aigner
- Member party: Christian Social Union
- Status in legislature: Majority government
- Opposition party: Social Democratic Party; Free Voters; The Greens

History
- Election: 2013 Bavarian state election
- Legislature term: 17th Landtag
- Predecessor: Seehofer I
- Successor: Söder I

The Cabinet Seehofer II was the state government of the German state of Bavaria from 10 October 2013 to 20 March 2018. The Cabinet was headed by Prime Minister Horst Seehofer and was a one-party government. Cabinet members hold the office of Ministers of their respective portfolio, except denoted otherwise. It was replaced by the Cabinet Söder.

== Composition ==
Portfolio	Minister	Took office	Left office	Party
Minister President	Horst Seehofer	10 October 2013	20 March 2018	CSU
Deputy Minister President & Minister of Economics, Media, Energy, and Technology	Ilse Aigner	10 October 2013	20 March 2018	CSU
Minister of Interior, Construction, and Transport	Joachim Herrmann	10 October 2013	20 March 2018	CSU
Minister of Justice	Winfried Bausback	10 October 2013	20 March 2018	CSU
Minister of Finance, Regional Development and Home Affairs	Markus Söder	10 October 2013	20 March 2018	CSU
Minister of Education, School, Science and Arts	Ludwig Spaenle	10 October 2013	20 March 2018	CSU
Minister of Environment and Consumer Protection	Marcel Huber	10 October 2013	5 September 2014	CSU
Minister of Environment and Consumer Protection	Ulrike Scharf	5 September 2014	20 March 2018	CSU
Minister of Food, Agriculture, and Forestry	Helmut Brunner	10 October 2013	20 March 2018	CSU
Minister of Health and Care	Melanie Huml	10 October 2013	20 March 2018	CSU
Minister of Labor, Social Affairs, Families, and Integration	Emilia Müller	10 October 2013	20 March 2018	CSU
Minister of European Affairs and Regional Relations	Beate Merk	10 October 2013	20 March 2018	CSU
State Chancellery	Christine Haderthauer	10 October 2013	1 September 2014	CSU
State Chancellery	Marcel Huber	5 September 2014	20 March 2018	CSU
