= Seehofer =

Seehofer is a surname. Notable people with the surname include:

- Emma Seehofer (before 1854–1912), German operatic contralto
- Horst Seehofer (born 1949), German politician
- Karin Seehofer (born 1958), second wife of Horst
