= Joachim Herrmann (CSU) =

German politician (born 1956)

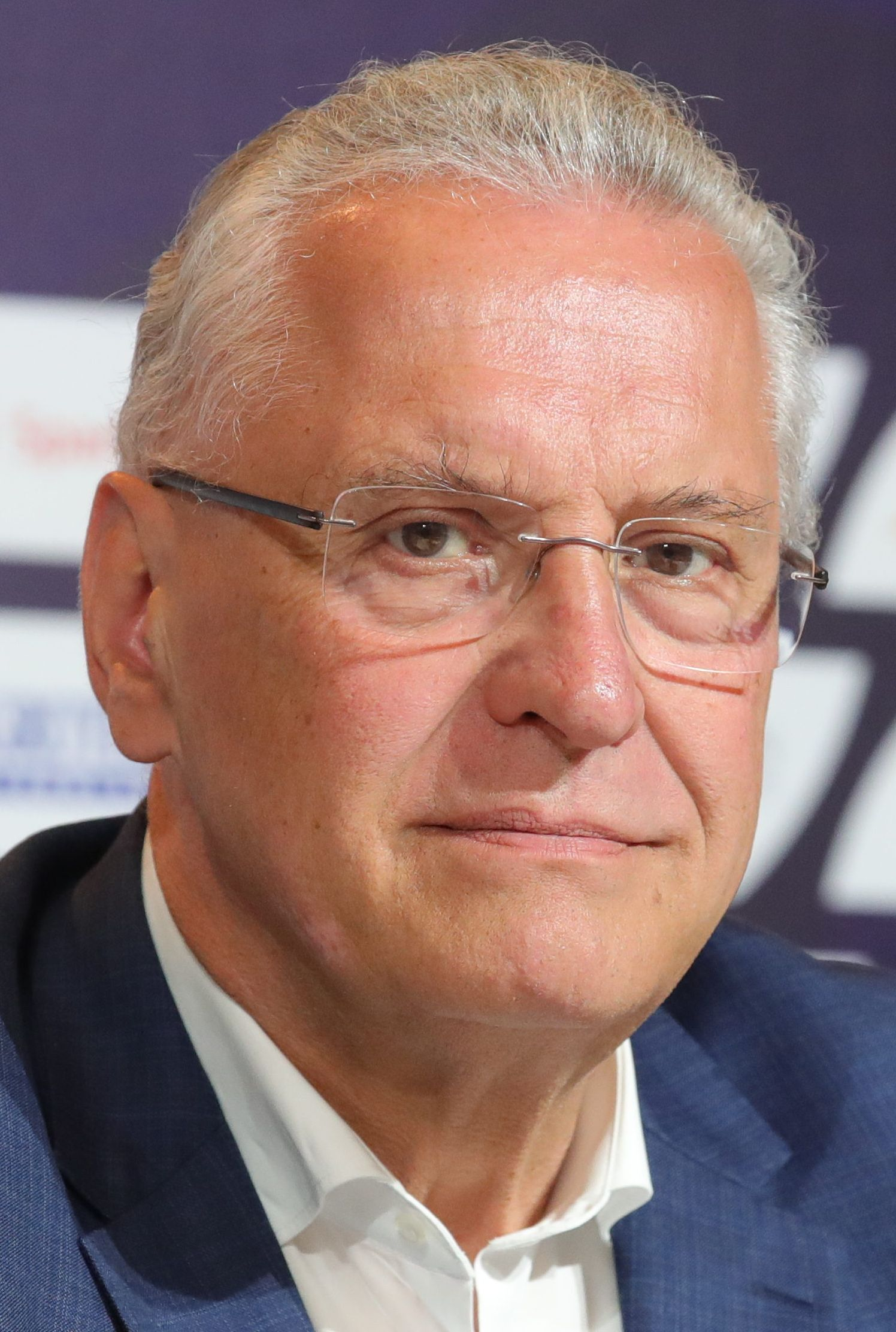
- Herrmann in 2022

Additional Deputy Minister President of Bavaria
- Incumbent
- Assumed office 30 October 2008
- Prime Minister: Horst Seehofer; Ilse Aigner (Acting); Markus Söder
- Preceded by: Office established

Minister of the Interior of Bavaria
- Incumbent
- Assumed office 30 October 2007
- Prime Minister: Günther Beckstein; Horst Seehofer; Ilse Aigner (Acting); Markus Söder
- Preceded by: Günther Beckstein

Leader of the Christian Social Union in the Landtag of Bavaria
- In office 6 October 2003 – 17 October 2007
- Preceded by: Alois Glück
- Succeeded by: Georg Schmid

Deputy General Secretary of the Christian Social Union
- In office 11 April 1997 – 6 October 1998
- Leader: Theodor Waigel
- Preceded by: Erwin Huber (1988)
- Succeeded by: Dorothee Bär (2009)

Member of the Landtag of Bavaria for Erlangen-Stadt
- Incumbent
- Assumed office 25 September 1994
- Preceded by: Wilhelm Vorndran

Personal details
- Born: 21 September 1956 (age 70) Munich, Bavaria, West Germany (now Germany)
- Party: CSU
- Spouse: Gerswid Terheyden
- Profession: Lawyer

Joachim Herrmann (born 21 September 1956) is a German politician. He is a member of the CSU party. Herrmann is an MP in the Landtag, the parliament of Bavaria since 1994. Since 16 October 2007 he has been Minister of the Interior of the state of Bavaria.

== Political career ==
Herrmann served as Secretary of State in the Bavarian Labour Ministry from 1998 to 1999 and faction leader of the CSU in the Landtag of Bavaria from 2003 to 2007. In October 2008 he was a candidate within the CSU party for the Minister-President of Bavaria but he withdrew candidacy in favor of Horst Seehofer.

Since 2007, Herrmann has been serving as Bavarian State Minister of the Interior. As one of Bavaria’s representatives at the Bundesrat, Hermann is a member of the Committee on Internal Affairs, the Committee on Transport as well as the Committee on Urban Development, Housing and Regional Planning.

Herrmann served as a CSU delegate to the Federal Convention for the purpose of electing the President of Germany in 2004, 2009, 2010 and 2012.

In the negotiations to form a coalition government of the Christian Democrats and the Free Democratic Party (FDP) following the 2009 federal elections, Herrmann was part of the CDU/CSU delegation in the working group on internal and legal affairs, led by Wolfgang Schäuble and Sabine Leutheusser-Schnarrenberger; and of the working group on transport and building policies, led by Hans-Peter Friedrich and Patrick Döring. In the negotiations to form a Grand Coalition of the Christian Democrats and the Social Democrats (SPD) following the 2013 federal elections, he was again part of the CDU/CSU delegation in the working group on internal and legal affairs, this time led by Hans-Peter Friedrich and Thomas Oppermann.

During his time in office, Herrmann witnessed numerous incidents of violence in Bavaria, including a train attack in Würzburg on 18 July 2016, a mass shooting that killed nine people in Munich on 22 July 2016 and a suicide bombing in Ansbach on 24 July 2016.

== Political positions ==
After the 2017 constitutional referendum that handed new powers to Turkish President Recep Tayyip Erdoğan, he called for the European Union to end discussions with Turkey about EU membership and argued failing to issue consequences after the referendum vote would hurt Europe.

== Other activities (selection) ==
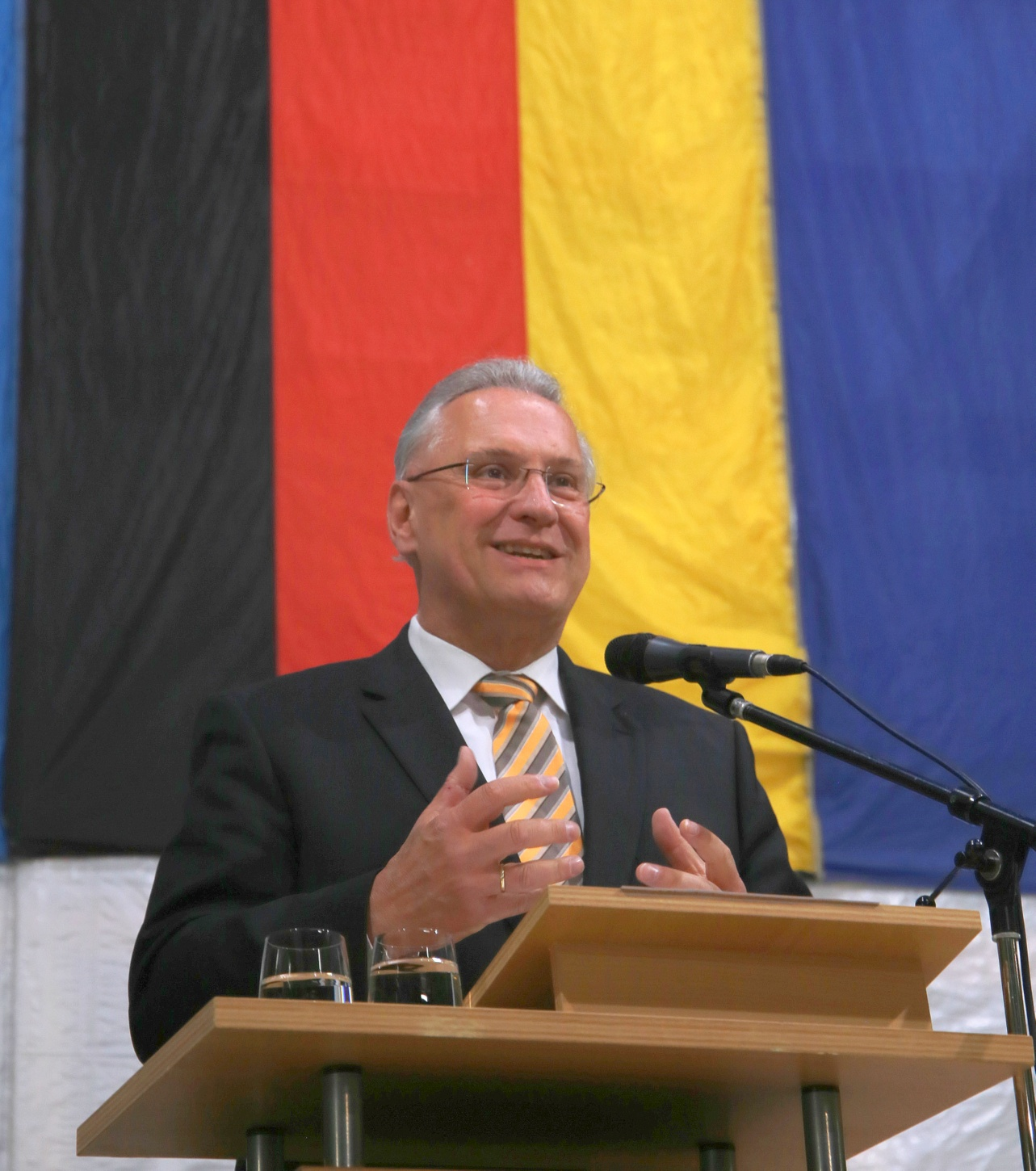
Herrmann, speaking in Munich in 2017

=== Regulatory bodies ===
- Federal Network Agency for Electricity, Gas, Telecommunications, Post and Railway (BNetzA), Substitute Member of the Rail Infrastructure Advisory Council

=== Corporate boards ===
- Nuremberg Airport, Ex-Officio Member of the Supervisory Board
- BayernLB, Member of the Supervisory Board (2010-2013)

=== Non-profits ===
- German Forum for Crime Prevention (DFK), Ex-Officio Member of the Board of Trustees
- University of Erlangen-Nuremberg (FAU), Member of the Board of Trustees
- Hanns Seidel Foundation, Member of the Board
- Stiftung Lebendige Stadt, Member of the Board of Trustees

== Recognition ==
- Order of the Holy Sepulchre (2004)
- Order of Leopold II (2011)

== Personal life ==
Herrmann was born in Munich. He is married and has three children.
