= Siegfried Schneider (politician) =

German politician

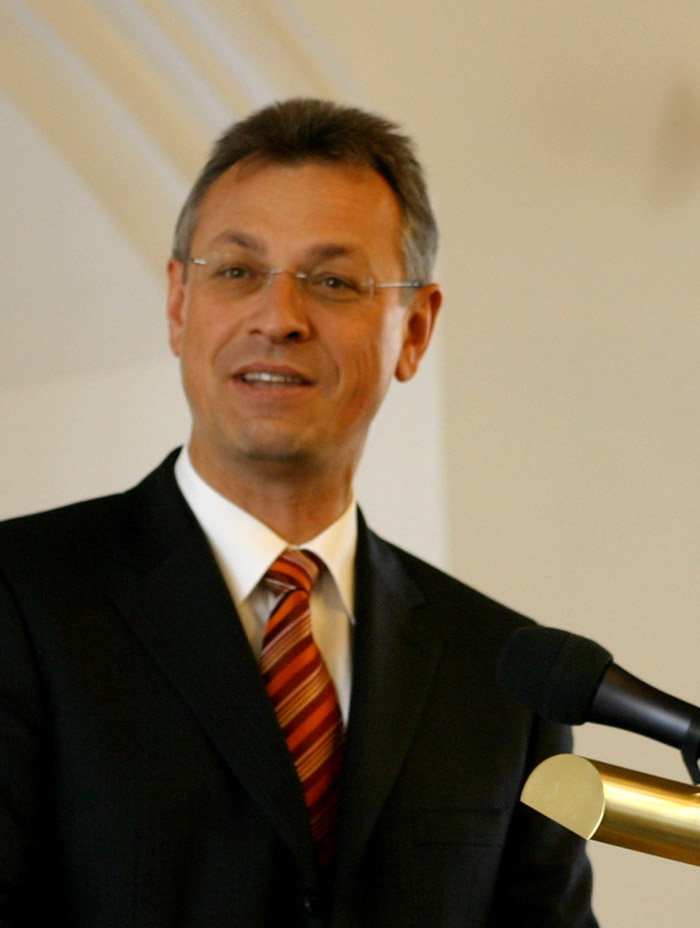
- Born: 7 April 1956 (age 70)
- Occupation: Politician

Siegfried Schneider (born 7 April 1956, Oberzell) is a German politician from Bavaria for the CSU political party in Germany and was as chief of the State Chancellery in the Cabinet Seehofer. On 22. June 2015 he became chairman of TSV 1860 Munich.
