= Ilse Aigner =

German politician (born 1964)

- Aigner in 2026

President of the Landtag of Bavaria
- Incumbent
- Assumed office 5 November 2018
- Preceded by: Barbara Stamm

Deputy Minister-President of Bavaria
- In office 10 October 2013 – 5 November 2018
- Minister-President: Horst Seehofer; Herself (acting); Markus Söder
- Preceded by: Martin Zeil
- Succeeded by: Hubert Aiwanger

Minister of Housing, Construction and Transport of Bavaria
- In office 21 March 2018 – 5 November 2018
- Minister-President: Markus Söder
- Preceded by: Office established
- Succeeded by: Hans Reichhart

Acting Minister-President of Bavaria
- In office 14 March 2018 – 16 March 2018
- Deputy: Herself
- Preceded by: Horst Seehofer
- Succeeded by: Markus Söder

Minister of the Economy, Energy, Technology and Media of Bavaria
- In office 10 October 2013 – 21 March 2018
- Minister-President: Horst Seehofer; Herself (acting); Markus Söder
- Preceded by: Martin Zeil
- Succeeded by: Franz Josef Pschierer

Federal Minister of Food, Agriculture and Consumer Protection
- In office 31 October 2008 – 30 September 2013
- Chancellor: Angela Merkel
- Preceded by: Horst Seehofer
- Succeeded by: Hans-Peter Friedrich

Member of the Bundestag; for Starnberg
- In office 26 October 1998 – 22 October 2013
- Preceded by: Wolfgang Gröbl
- Succeeded by: Alexander Radwan

Member of the Landtag of Bavaria
- Incumbent
- Assumed office 15 September 2013
- Preceded by: Alexander Radwan
- Constituency: Miesbach
- In office 20 October 1994 – 28 September 1998
- Constituency: Upper Bavaria

Personal details
- Born: 7 December 1964 (age 61) Feldkirchen-Westerham, West Germany
- Party: Christian Social Union (since 1985)
- Occupation: Engineer • Politician

Ilse Aigner (born 7 December 1964) is a German politician and engineer. A member of the Christian Social Union of Bavaria (CSU), she serves as President of the Landtag of Bavaria. Born in Feldkirchen-Westerham, she served in Angela Merkel's first and second cabinets as Federal Minister of Food, Agriculture and Consumer Protection from 2008 to 2013, succeeding her party colleague Horst Seehofer.

From 2013, she moved into Bavarian state politics, serving under then Minister-President Seehofer as Deputy Minister-President and Minister of Economy, Energy, Technology and Media. Seehofer's resignation in 2018 resulted in Aigner became acting Minister President until the election of Markus Söder, who appointed her as state Minister of Housing, Construction and Transport. After the 2018 Bavarian State elections, she was elected as President of the Bavarian Landtag, succeeding longterm president Barbara Stamm who had lost her seat in the election.

In 2026, the CDU/CSU nominated her to succeed Federal President Frank-Walter Steinmeier following the completion of his term in 2027.

== Education and professional background ==
Aigner completed a professional training as a telecommunications technician in 1985 and joined her parents’ electrical installation business.

In 1990 she graduated from the technical academy with the degree of a State Certified Engineer and worked for several years for Eurocopter in the development of helicopter electric systems.

== Political career ==
Aigner was elected first in 1994 to the Bavarian State Parliament.

=== Member of the German Bundestag, 1998–2013 ===
From 1998 Aigner was a member of the German Bundestag, always winning an absolute majority of the votes in her electoral district.

Election results for the Bundestag
Year	Electoral District	Votes for Aigner	Votes for opposing Candidate (SPD)
1998	Starnberg	57,0%	26,2%
2002	Starnberg	63,5%	21,9%
2005	Starnberg	59,7%	22,0%
2009	Starnberg	54,0%	15,8%

From 2002 to 2005, she was a member of the Budget Committee, where she served as her parliamentary group's rapporteur on the budgets of the Federal Ministry for Consumer Protection, Food and Agriculture (BMELV) and the aerospace technology portfolio of the Federal Ministry of Education and Research (BMBF). From 2005 to 2008, she served as her parliamentary group's spokesperson for education and research policy.

=== Federal Minister for Consumer Protection, Food and Agriculture, 2008–2013 ===
Aigner was a little-known member of parliament with no previous ministerial experience when she took over as Federal Minister for Consumer Protection, Food and Agriculture in the cabinet of Chancellor Angela Merkel in 2008, replacing Horst Seehofer.

During her time in office, Aigner steered through a 2011 dioxins scare that saw contaminated eggs and meat from Germany going to six neighbouring countries. In response, she imposed tough new safety standards for animal feed manufacturers, a move widely supported in the market to retain public confidence.

She took a tough line against cultivation of genetically modified organisms (GMOs) in Germany but received praise from commodity traders when she supported imports of GMOs approved in the United States and South America to secure German supplies of soybeans for animal feed. Meanwhile, she repeatedly expressed concern that outside financial investment in agricultural commodity markets distorts prices, instead calling for more transparency in commodity markets and clear visibility of the difference between futures investment by industrial food buyers and financial investors.

In 2009, Aigner caused a controversy when she called for requirements to publish the names and location of recipients of Common Agricultural Policy (CAP) subsidies to be “suspended” until the implications for data protection have been assessed. In response, the European Commissioner for Agriculture and Rural Development Mariann Fischer Boel threatened Germany with legal action.

Aigner has been outspoken in her criticism of Facebook, which she has said needs to do to protect its users′ privacy. In September 2011, she asked all federal ministers in Germany not to use Facebook for public relations and communication. In 2010, she criticized Google over plans to give property owners a four-week deadline to stop their buildings from showing up on the company's then newly launched Street View mapping service, demanding that all requests be considered instead.

Amid the German debate on the country's energy transition to an energy portfolio dominated by renewable energy, Aigner called in later 2012 for the partial nationalization of the country's electrical grid in order to ensure that high-voltage power lines required to transport green energy from offshore windfarms and other sources to the industry-heavy regions of southern Germany are built.

In 2012, Aigner announced she would leave her post to return to local politics in her home state of Bavaria following the 2013 national elections, prompting speculation that she was eyeing the post of Bavarian Minister-President Horst Seehofer. This seemed even more likely as she had been elected chairwoman of her party's Upper Bavaria district association in 2011, the largest and most powerful CSU subdivision.

=== Deputy Minister-President of Bavaria, 2013–2018 ===
Following her return to Bavaria after the state's 2013 elections, Aigner was named Minister-President Horst Seehofer′s deputy as well as Bavarian Minister for Economic Affairs, Media, Energy and Technology. As one of Bavaria's representatives at the Bundesrat, she served on the Committee on Cultural Affairs; the Committee on Economic Affairs; and the Committee on the Environment, Nature Protection and Reactor Safety.

In the negotiations to form a grand coalition following the 2013 national elections, Aigner led the CDU/CSU delegation in the working group on economic affairs; her co-chair from the SPD was Hubertus Heil. On 17 December 2013, she became the first woman to ever chair a meeting of the Bavarian State Government.

In the cabinet of Minister-President Markus Söder, Aigner briefly served as State Minister of Construction and Transport in 2018. On the Bundesrat, she became a member of the Committee on Transport and of the Committee on Urban Development, Housing and Regional Planning.

=== President of the Bavarian Landtag, 2018–present ===
Aigner 2021

On 5 November 2018, Aigner was elected with 198 of 205 votes as new President of the Bavarian Landtag. After the 2023 Bavarian state election she was re-elected with 164 of 200 votes.

== Presidential candidacy ==
On 6 November 2026, the CDU/CSU nominated her to succeed incumbent Federal President Frank-Walter Steinmeier following the completion of his term in 2027. If elected, she would be the first woman elected to the presidency in the country's history.

== Other activities ==
=== Regulatory bodies ===
- Bavarian Regulatory Authority for Commercial Broadcasting (BLM), Ex-Officio Chairwoman of the supervisory board (2013–2018)
- Federal Network Agency for Electricity, Gas, Telecommunications, Posts and Railway, Ex-Officio Member of the advisory board (2013–2018)

=== Corporate boards ===
- FilmFernsehFonds Bayern, Ex-Officio Chairwoman of the supervisory board (2013–2018)
- LfA Förderbank Bayern, Ex-Officio Member of the supervisory board (2013–2018)
- Messe München, Ex-Officio Chairwoman of the supervisory board (2013–2018)
- Landwirtschaftliche Rentenbank, Ex-Officio Member of the supervisory board (2005–2013)
- KfW, Ex-Officio Member of the supervisory board (2008–2013)

=== Non-profit organizations ===
- Hanns Seidel Foundation, Member of the Board
- Bayerischer Rundfunk (BR), Member of the supervisory board (since 2018)
- Deutsches Museum, Member of the Board of Trustees (since 2004)
- Ifo Institute for Economic Research, Member of the Board of Trustees
- Helmholtz Association of German Research Centres, Ex-Officio Member of the Senate
- Technical University of Munich (TUM), Member of the Board of Trustees
- Bavarian Research Foundation, Ex-Officio Member of the Board of Trustees (2013–2018)
- Max Planck Society, Ex-Officio Member of the Senate (2013–2018)
- Munich International Film Festival, Ex-Officio Member of the supervisory board (2013–2018
- Association of the German Army (FKH), Member of the Presidium (2002–2008)
- German Energy Agency (DENA), Ex-Officio Member of the supervisory board (2005–2011)
- Max Planck Institute for Astrophysics, Member of the Board of Trustees (2005–2008)
- Max Planck Institute for Extraterrestrial Physics, Member of the Board of Trustees (2005–2008)
- Wasserwacht of the Bavarian Red Cross, Chairwoman (2001–2009)

== Personal life ==
Aigner is a Roman Catholic. She is single and has no children.

Political offices
Preceded by Horst Seehofer	Minister of Food, Agriculture and Consumer Protection; 2001–2006	Succeeded by Hans-Peter Friedrich
Preceded by Martin Zeil	Deputy Minister-President of Bavaria; 2013–2018	Succeeded by Hubert Aiwanger
Preceded by Horst Seehofer	Minister-President of Bavaria; Acting; 2018	Succeeded by Markus Söder
Preceded by Barbara Stamm	President of the Landtag of Bavaria; 2018–present	Incumbent
