= Markus Söder =

German politician (born 1967)

Markus Söder MdL MdBR
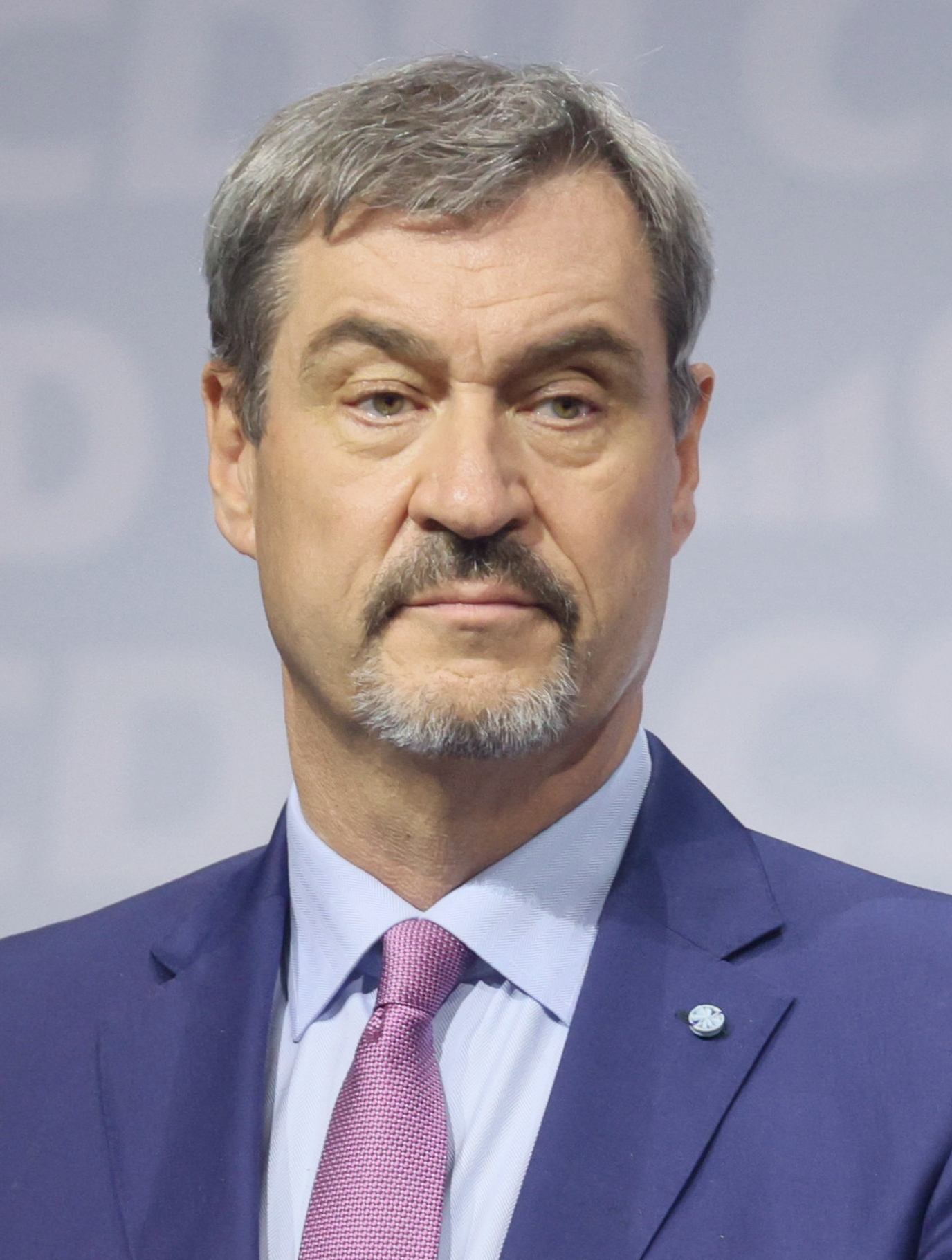
- Söder in 2025

Minister-President of Bavaria
- Incumbent
- Assumed office 16 March 2018
- Deputy: Ilse Aigner; Hubert Aiwanger
- Preceded by: Horst Seehofer

Leader of the Christian Social Union
- Incumbent
- Assumed office 19 January 2019
- General Secretary: Markus Blume; Stephan Mayer; Martin Huber
- Preceded by: Horst Seehofer
Bavarian Cabinet
Minister of Finance, Regional Development and Home Affairs
In office 3 November 2011 – 21 March 2018
Minister-President	Horst Seehofer
Preceded by	Georg Fahrenschon
Succeeded by	Albert Füracker
Minister of Health and the Environment
In office 20 October 2008 – 4 November 2011
Minister-President	Horst Seehofer
Preceded by	Otmar Bernhard
Succeeded by	Marcel Huber
Minister of Federal and European Affairs
In office 16 November 2007 – 17 October 2008
Minister-President	Günther Beckstein
Preceded by	Emilia Müller
Succeeded by	Emilia Müller

General Secretary of the Christian Social Union
- In office 17 November 2003 – 22 October 2007
- Leader: Edmund Stoiber; Erwin Huber
- Preceded by: Thomas Goppel
- Succeeded by: Christine Haderthauer

Member of the Landtag of Bavaria for Nuremberg-East (Nuremberg-West; 1994–2018)
- Incumbent
- Assumed office 20 October 1994
- Preceded by: Heinz Leschanowsky
- Succeeded by: Jochen Kohler

Personal details
- Born: Markus Thomas Theodor Söder; 5 January 1967 (age 59) Nuremberg, Bavaria, West Germany
- Party: Christian Social Union (since 1983)
- Spouse: Karin Baumüller (m. 1999)
- Children: 4
- Education: University of Erlangen–Nuremberg

Military service
- Allegiance: Germany
- Branch/service: Bundeswehr
- Years of service: 1986–1987
- Unit: German Army (Heer) / Transportbataillon 270
- Söder's voice About the lake Untreu in Bavaria

Markus Thomas Theodor Söder (born 5 January 1967) is a German politician who has served as Minister-President of Bavaria since 2018 and leader of the Christian Social Union in Bavaria (CSU) since 2019.

== Background, education and military service ==
Söder was born in Nuremberg, Germany and is the son of a building contractor. After graduating from the Dürer-Gymnasium Nuremberg in 1986, Söder completed his compulsory year of military service from 1986 to 1987. He then studied law at the University of Erlangen–Nuremberg from 1987, with a scholarship from the Konrad Adenauer Foundation. He passed his first state examination in 1991 and was a research assistant at the department of constitutional, administrative and church law at the same university. In 1998, he was awarded a doctorate in law with a dissertation in legal history with the title Von altdeutschen Rechtstraditionen zu einem modernen Gemeindeedikt. Die Entwicklung der Kommunalgesetzgebung im rechtsrheinischen Bayern zwischen 1802 und 1818 (lit. 'From old German legal traditions to a modern municipal edict: The development of municipal legislation in Bavaria on the right bank of the Rhine between 1802 and 1818'). He worked as a trainee and then as an editor with Bayerischer Rundfunk, a public-service television and radio network, based in Munich, from 1992 to 1994, when he was elected to the Bavarian Parliament and became a full-time politician.

== Political career ==
=== Career in Bavarian politics ===
Söder has been a member of the Landtag, the state parliament of Bavaria, since 1994. From 2003 to 2007 he was secretary general of the CSU party, the sister party in Bavaria of the Christian Democratic Union of Germany (CDU). In this capacity, he worked closely with then Minister-President and party chairman Edmund Stoiber. During his time in office, he was also part of the CDU/CSU team in the negotiations with the Social Democratic Party of Germany (SPD) on a coalition agreement following the 2005 federal elections, which paved the way to the formation of Chancellor Angela Merkel's first cabinet.

Söder has since been member of the Beckstein, Seehofer I and II cabinets. From 2007 to 2008 he was Bavaria's State Minister for Federal and European Affairs, the successor office of Foreign Minister of Bavaria, and from 2008 to 2011 State Minister for Environment and Health. In the negotiations to form a coalition government following the 2009 federal elections, Söder was part of the working group on the environment, agriculture and consumer protection, led by Ilse Aigner and Michael Kauch, and the working group on health, led by Ursula von der Leyen and Philipp Rösler.

=== State Minister of Finance, 2011–2018 ===
As finance minister in the state government of Minister-President Horst Seehofer, Söder was also one of the state's representatives at the Bundesrat, where he served on the Finance Committee. During his time in office, Söder was put in charge of overseeing the restructuring process of ailing state-backed lender BayernLB in a bid to win approval for an aid package from the European Commission. In 2014, he pushed BayernLB to sell its Hungarian MKB unit to that country's government, ending an ill-fated investment that had cost it a total of €2 billion ($2.7 billion) in losses over 20 years. In 2015, Söder and his Austrian counterpart Hans Jörg Schelling agreed a provisional deal that settled the two governments’ array of legal disputes stemming from the collapse of the Carinthian regional bank Hypo Alpe-Adria-Bank International. Under the memorandum of understanding, Austria would pay €1.23 billion to Bavaria. All legal cases relating to the dispute would also be dropped.

Also in 2012, Söder and Minister-President Horst Seehofer filed a lawsuit in the Federal Constitutional Court, asking the judges to back their call for an overhaul of the German system of financial transfers from wealthier states (such as Bavaria) to the country's weaker economies. On Söder's initiative, Bavaria became the first regional government in Volkswagen's home country to take legal action against the carmaker for damages caused by its emissions-test cheating scandal. At the time, Söder argued that the state's pension fund for civil servants had lost as much as €700,000 ($780,000) as a consequence of the scandal. When Seehofer came under pressure after the CSU had suffered heavy losses in the 2017 national elections, he decided to remain party chairman but agreed to hand over leadership of Bavaria to Söder. This was the result of a long-running "internal strife" between Söder and Seehofer.

=== Minister-President of Bavaria, 2018–present ===
In March 2018, lawmakers formally elected Söder as new Minister-President of Bavaria to replace Horst Seehofer, who had become Federal Interior Minister in Chancellor Angela Merkel's new cabinet. He received 99 of the 169 state deputies's votes, with 64 voting against – a better result than Seehofer when he began his final term in 2013.

The following Bavarian State Election (October 2018) yielded the worst result for the CSU (top candidate Markus Söder) since 1950 with 37% of votes, a decline of over ten percentage points compared to Seehofer's last result from 2013. As a consequence, Söder had to form a coalition government with the Freie Wähler as minor partner. In January 2019, CSU delegates elected Söder to replace Seehofer as their leader with an 87.4 percent majority at a party conference. He was the sole candidate.

=== Potential candidate for Chancellor ===
After the onset of the COVID-19 pandemic in Germany, Söder was discussed as a possible candidate to succeed Angela Merkel in the 2021 German federal election. A May 2020 poll indicated that 53% of Germans favoured him as the CDU/CSU's Chancellor candidate. During the same time, he enjoyed approval ratings of over 90% in Bavaria.

After the election of Armin Laschet as CDU chairman in January 2021, he and Söder considered themselves the major contenders for the Chancellor candidacy. As the contest intensified in March/April 2021, Söder was backed by the CSU as well as some state and local CDU associations, while Laschet received the support of most of the CDU. The two men failed to come to an agreement by the given deadline of 19 April, leading the federal CDU board to hold an impromptu meeting to break the deadlock. The board voted 31 to 9 in favour of Laschet. After the vote, Söder announced his support for Laschet as Chancellor candidate.

On 21 June 2021, Söder and Laschet jointly presented the joint election manifesto of the two parties, CSU and CDU. In the programme, it is stated that the fight against pandemics, climate change and the defence of prosperity and freedom are global challenges and that the aim is to create a Germany open to the world, which strives for both modernisation and green policies.

In September 2021, Söder was reelected as chair of the CSU, winning 87.6 percent of the vote at a party congress in Nuremberg.

In September 2024, having first expressed his readiness to run as Union's candidate, Söder announced his support for Friedrich Merz as Union's candidate for Chancellor of Germany for the 2025 federal election, after Hendrik Wüst (CDU) had expressed his support for Friedrich Merz.

== Role in national politics ==
Söder was a CSU delegate to the Federal Convention for the purpose of electing the President of Germany in 1999, 2004, 2009, 2010, 2012, 2017 and 2022.

In the negotiations to form a coalition government of the Christian Democrats (CDU together with the Bavarian CSU) and the Free Democratic Party (FDP) following the 2009 federal elections, Söder was part of the CDU/CSU delegation in the working group on health policy, led by Ursula von der Leyen and Philipp Rösler.

In the negotiations to form a Grand Coalition of the CDU/CSU and the SPD following the 2013 federal elections, Söder was part of the CDU/CSU delegation in the working groups on financial policy and the national budget, led by Wolfgang Schäuble and Olaf Scholz, and on bank regulation and the Eurozone, led by Herbert Reul and Martin Schulz.

== Other activities (selection) ==
=== Corporate boards ===
- Munich Airport, ex officio chairman of the supervisory board
- Nuremberg Airport, ex officio member of the supervisory board, chairman of the supervisory board (since 2017)
- KfW, ex officio member of the board of supervisory directors (2011–2016)
- BayernLB, ex officio chairman of the supervisory board (2011–2012)
- ZDF, ex officio member of the Television Board (2002–2008, 2013–2016)

=== Non-profit organisations ===
- Bavarian Research Foundation, ex officio member of the board of trustees
- Deutsches Museum, member of the board of trustees
- University of Erlangen-Nuremberg (FAU), member of the board of trustees
- Staatstheater Nürnberg, member of the board of trustees
- Ifo Institute for Economic Research, member of the board of trustees
- 1. FC Nürnberg, member of the supervisory board (2007–2011), member of the advisory board (since 2011)
- Munich International Film Festival, ex officio member of the supervisory board (2011–2014)

== Political positions ==
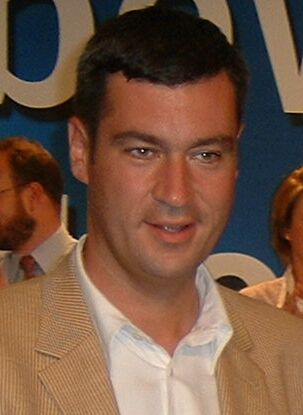
Söder in 2003

=== European integration ===
During the Greek government-debt crisis, Söder was among the most vocal in calling for Greece to leave the Eurozone. By 2012, he said in an interview: "Athens must stand as an example that this Eurozone can also show teeth." In early 2018, Söder reiterated his opposition against any expansion of the eurozone to include countries like Bulgaria and Romania, the introduction of Eurobonds, and the creation of a European finance minister post.

=== Domestic policy ===
In 2012, under Söder's leadership, Bavaria pledged €500,000 ($687,546) in public funding for the Munich-based Institute for Contemporary History (IfZ) to produce a critical, annotated version of Adolf Hitler’s Mein Kampf for publication in 2015 when the copyright expired. Söder said at the time that the publication would aim to "demystify" Hitler's manifesto. By 2013, however, the Bavarian state government ended its funding for the project.

In 2018, Söder's government enacted the Kreuzpflicht, an obligation to display crosses at the entrance of public buildings. Söder has stated that the crosses are not to be seen as Christian symbols, but as symbols of Bavarian cultural identity. During his campaign for the 2018 state elections, Söder appealed to traditionalists while also seeking to enhance Bavaria's high-tech "laptops and Lederhosen" reputation with a promise of a new space programme for the state and more high-speed internet access.

==== Immigration ====
Throughout the European migrant crisis, Söder sharply criticised the migrant policies of Angela Merkel several times. He warned of a "huge security gap" that remained because the whereabouts of hundreds of thousands of migrants was still unclear and he strongly doubted that the integration of so many people could succeed. In Söder's view, the Germans did not want a multicultural society. Refugees should return to their home countries whenever possible. The dictum Wir schaffen das (lit. 'We can do it') of Chancellor Merkel was "not the right signal", instead he suggested Wir haben verstanden (lit. 'We have understood').

==== COVID-19 pandemic ====
During the COVID-19 pandemic in Germany, Söder was the first Minister-President to announce a lockdown within his federal state. His management raised his popularity and made him a contender for the chancellorship in 2021. During autumn and winter 2021, low vaccination rates in Bavaria generated controversy, with Söder being in favour of mandatory vaccinations.

=== Family policy ===
In a July 2020 interview with Ulrich Wickert, Söder supported same-sex marriage in Germany.

=== Foreign policy ===
In his capacity as Minister-President, Söder has made several foreign trips, including for meetings with President Sahle-Work Zewde of Ethiopia (2019), President Vladimir Putin of Russia (2020), Prime Minister Andrej Plenković of Croatia (2022), Minister of Foreign Affairs Eli Cohen of Israel (2023), Premier Li Qiang of China (2024), Prime Minister Giorgia Meloni of Italy (2024) and Minister of External Affairs S. Jaishankar of India (2025).

== Recognition ==
- 2024 – Honorary doctorate, Tsinghua University

== Personal life ==
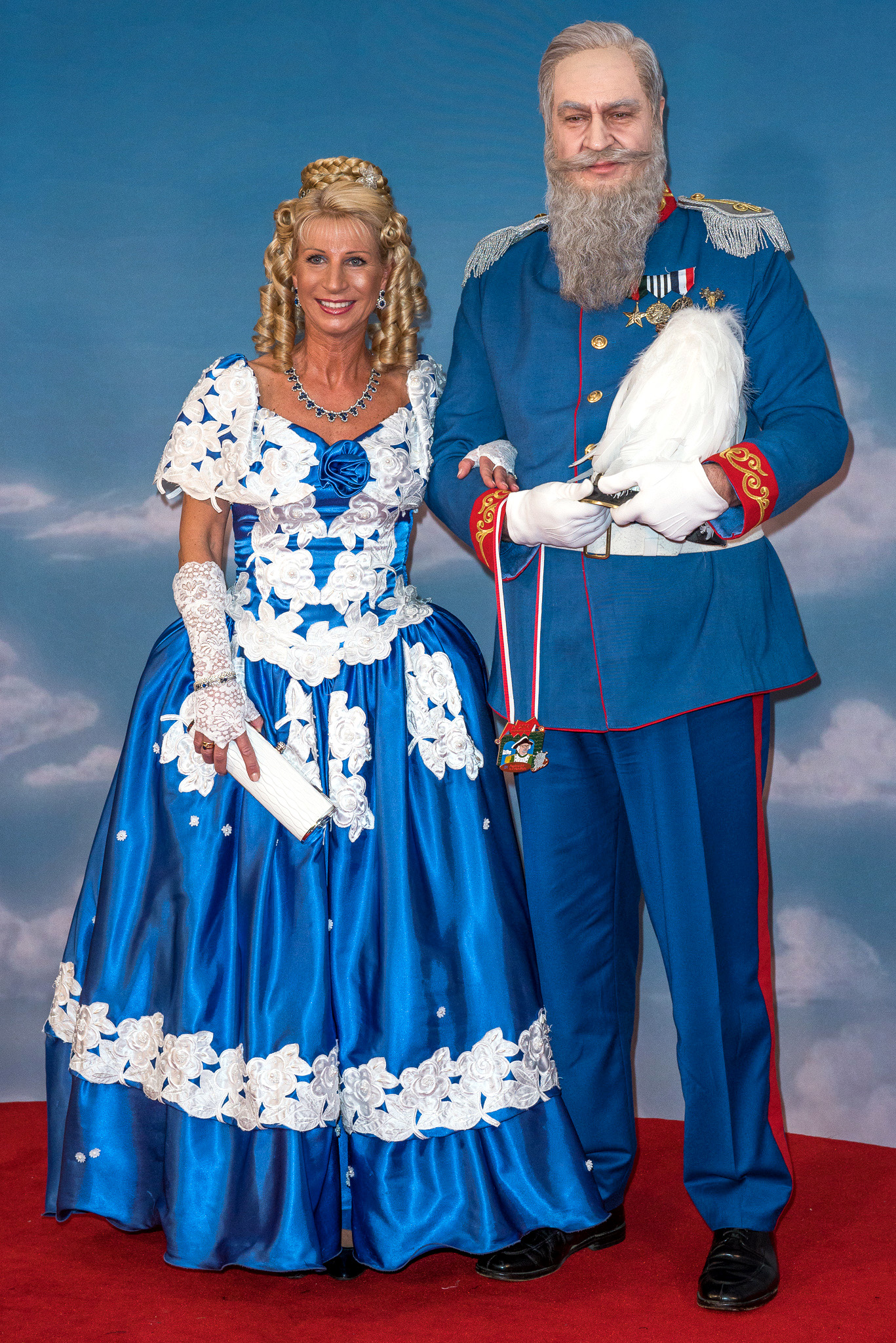
Söder and his wife Karin during the 2018 Fastnacht; Söder is dressed as Luitpold, Prince Regent of Bavaria and wearing the uniform of a General of the Kingdom of Bavaria.

Söder has been married to Karin Baumüller since 1999; Baumüller is one of the owners of Nuremberg-based Baumüller Group, a manufacturer of electric automation and drive systems. The couple have three children. In addition, Söder has a daughter from an earlier relationship.

Söder is a member of the Evangelical Church in Germany and has described himself as "a believer". He is also known for his extravagant costumes during the carnival season which have included Shrek and Marilyn Monroe.

Political offices
Preceded by Ilse Aigner; Acting	Minister-President of Bavaria; 2018–present	Incumbent
Party political offices
Preceded by Horst Seehofer	Leader of the Christian Social Union; 2019–present	Incumbent
