= Karin Seehofer =

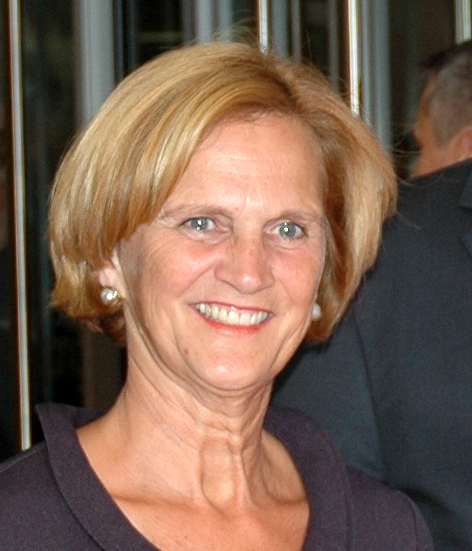
- Seehofer in 2014
- Born: Karin Starck; April 1958 (age 68)
- Spouse: Horst Seehofer
- Relatives: Konrad Dryden (cousin)

Karin Seehofer (born April 1958) is the second wife of the Bavarian Minister-President Horst Seehofer. After Christian Wulff's resignation on 17 February 2012, her husband became acting head of state of Germany in his capacity as President of the German Bundesrat, until the election of Joachim Gauck on 18 March 2012. She is also a cousin of American author Konrad Dryden.

Her parents owned a small brewery, Brauerei Stark, in Schamhaupten. She worked in the civil service, where she met Horst Seehofer. They married on Christmas Eve in 1985, and have two daughters and a son.

After her husband's election as Minister-president of Bavaria in 2008, she has undertaken a great number of representative duties, and is the protector of many charitable organisations.
