= Emilia Müller =

German politician

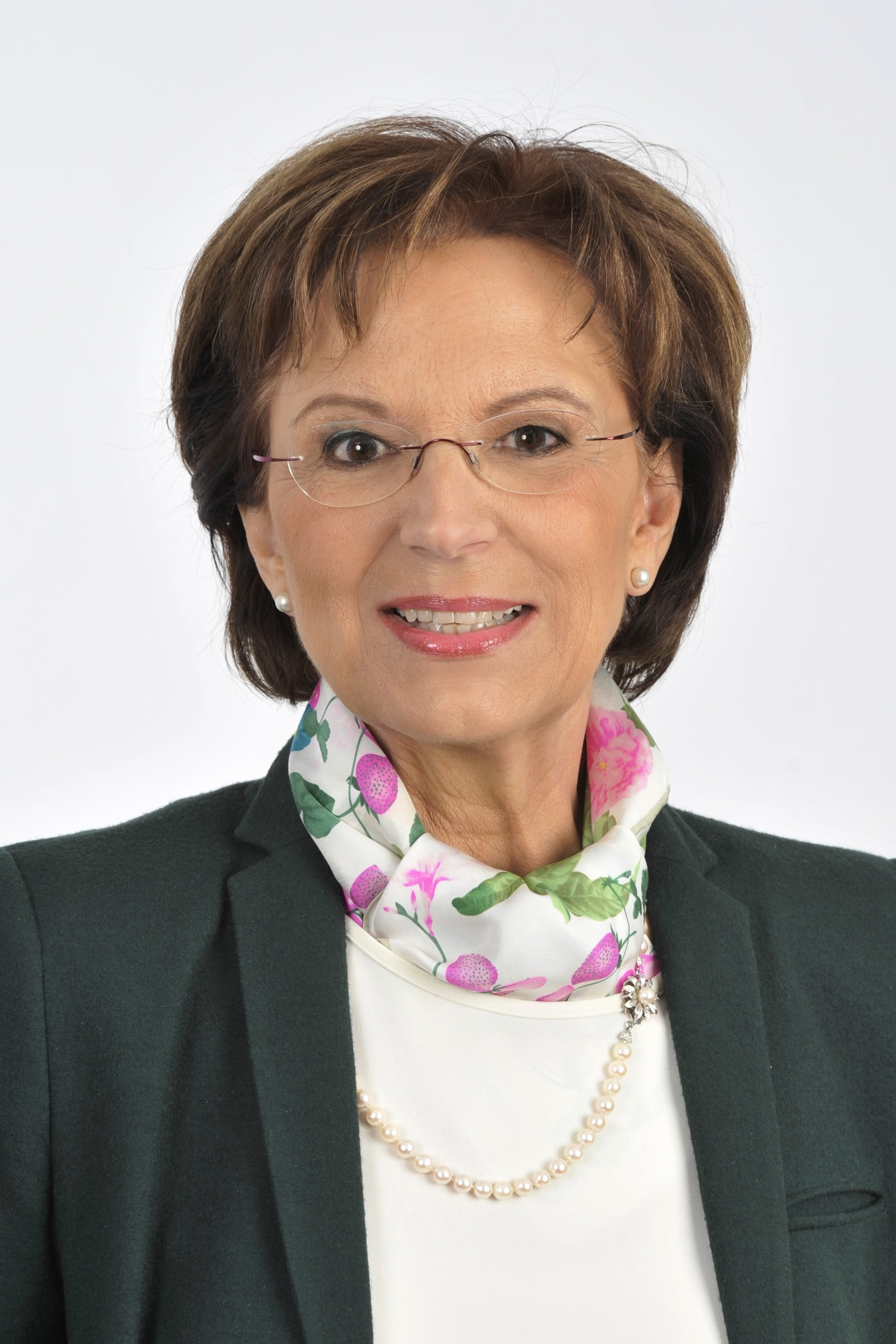

Minister of Families, Labor, Social Affairs in Bavaria
- In office 2013–2018
- Succeeded by: Kerstin Schreyer

Member of the Landtag of Bavaria
- Incumbent
- Assumed office 2013

Personal details
- Born: 28 September 1951 (age 74) Schwandorf, Bavaria, West Germany
- Party: Christian Social Union
- Profession: Chemical technician; Politician

Emilia Franziska Müller (born 28 September 1951) is a German chemical technician and politician. A member of the conservative Christian Social Union of Bavaria (CSU), she has served as a member of the Landtag and as Ministry of Labor and Social Affairs, Family and Integration in the 2nd Cabinet of Minister-President Horst Seehofer since 2013. She has held a wide range of public positions at the municipal, state, and European Parliamentary level since beginning her political career in 1990.

== Early life ==
Müller was born in Schwandorf, Bavaria. After becoming a certified chemical technician, Müller began her career in 1972 working in the Max Planck Institute of Cell Chemistry, followed by a period of employment at the Institute of Biochemistry of University of Regensburg. She remained employed at the University, working in the Institute of Biochemistry, Microbiology and Genetics starting in 1988 where she remained until moving to the university's Institute of Physiology in 1988.

== Early political career ==
Müller began her political career at the municipal level, serving as a local councillor in the marktgemeinde (market town) of Bruck in the Upper Palatine from 1990 to 2003, and as district councillor in Schwandorf beginning in 1996. From 2005 to 2009, Müller served as a county chairwoman of the Women's Union, the women's working group of the CSU, and became chairwoman of the district association of the Upper Palatine CSU in 2008.

In 1999, Müller was elected to the European Parliament where she was a member of the Group of the European People's Party (Christian Democrats) and European Democrats, a body she would serve on until 2003. In 2010, she became a member of the Committee of Regions of the European Parliament.

== Career in State politics ==
On 14 October 2003, Müller was appointed Secretary of State for the Ministry of Environment, Health and Consumer Protection in the 4th Cabinet of Minister-President Edmund Stoiber, a position she would hold until her appointment on 29 November 2005 as Minister of State for Federal and European Affairs. After succeeding Stoiber as Minister-President, Günther Beckstein appointed Müller as Minister of Economy, Infrastructure, Transport and Technology on 16 October 2007. From 2007 to 2008, Müller concurrently served on the board of BayernLB, the public bank majority-owned by the State of Bavaria.

In the 2008 state election, Müller failed to be elected to the Landtag; despite this, she was once again chosen as Minister of State for Federal and European Affairs by newly elected Minister-President Horst Seehofer in the cabinet of his coalition government, composed of members of the CSU and their junior coalition partner, the Free Democratic Party (FDP). Following the result of the 2013 state election, which resulted in Müller's election to the Landtag and an absolute majority for the CSU, she was appointed to the 2nd Seehofer Cabinet as Minister of Labor and Social Affairs, Family and Integration, replacing fellow party member Christine Harderthauer.

In her position as Minister of Labor and Social Affairs, Family and Integration, Müller was criticized for the remarks she made when visiting a newly opened detention center near Ingolstadt in 2015. In the televised encounter, Müller told an asylum-seeker from Kosovo “You are well housed? Good. But you know that you have to go back”, a remark criticized by the Süddeutsche Zeitung as depicting a “complete lack of empathy for fleeing people”.

== Personal life ==
Müller is married and has two children, both of whom are adults. She currently resides in Bruck in the Upper Palatinate.
