= Kerstin Schreyer =

German politician (born 1971)

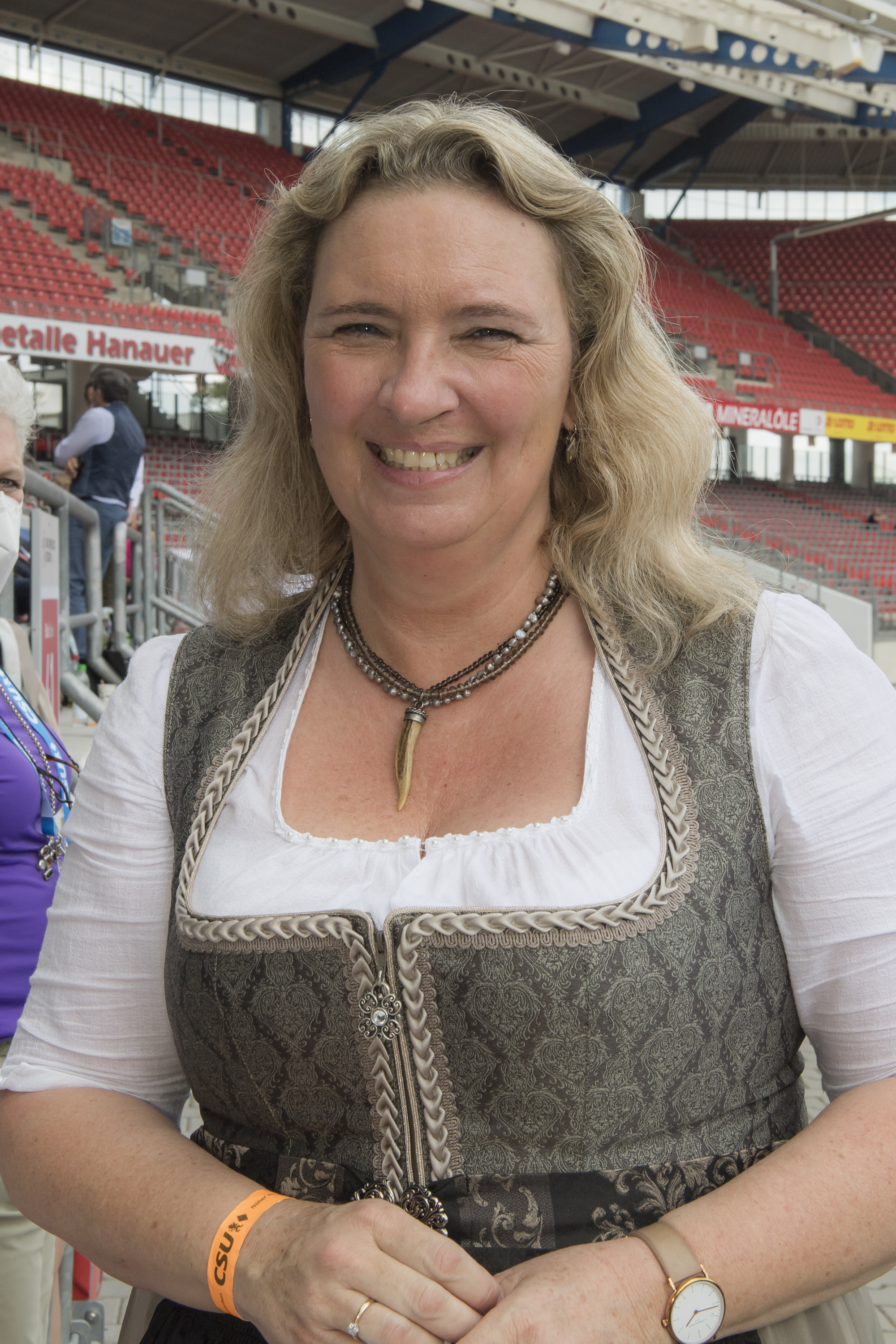
- Schreyer in 2021

Member of the Landtag of Bavaria
- Incumbent
- Assumed office 20 October 2008
- Preceded by: Engelbert Kupka
- Constituency: Munich Land South

Personal details
- Born: 29 June 1971 (age 54) Munich
- Party: Christian Social Union (since 1988)

Kerstin Schreyer (formerly Schreyer-Stäblein; born 29 June 1971 in Munich) is a German politician serving as a member of the Landtag of Bavaria since 2008. From 2018 to 2020, she served as minister of family, labour and social affairs of Bavaria. From 2020 to 2022, she served as minister of housing, construction and transport.
