= Martin Zeil =

German lawyer and politician

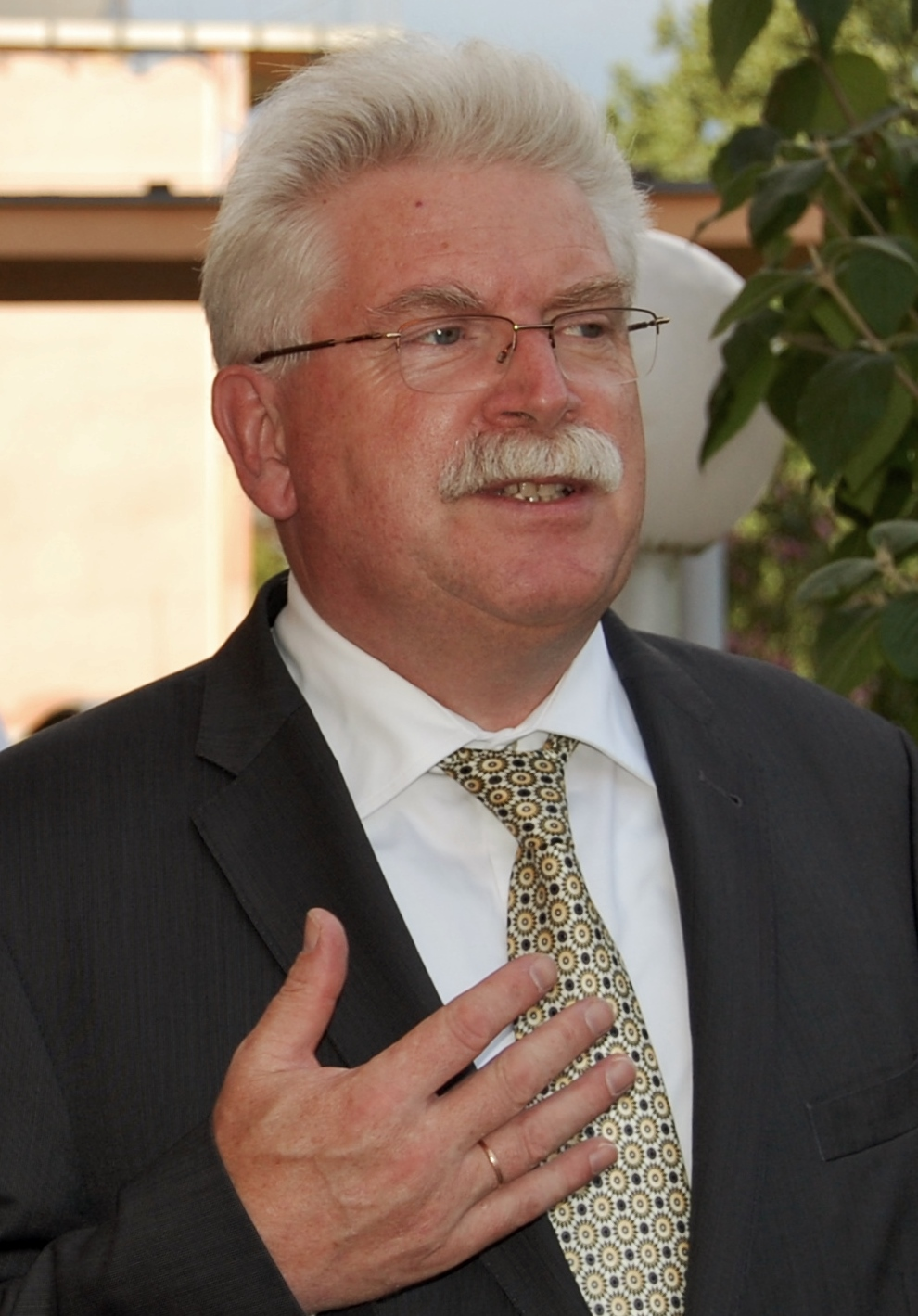
Zeil in 2013

Martin Zeil (born 28 April 1956) is a German lawyer and politician of the Free Democratic Party (FDP).

== Early life and education ==
Zeil studied law at LMU Munich. From 1984 until 2008, he worked as lawyer with private bank Hauck & Aufhäuser.

== Political career ==
From 2005 to 2008, Zeil was member of German Bundestag, where he served on the Committee on Economic Affairs and Technology. He was his parliamentary group's spokesperson for antitrust law.

From 2008 to 2013 Zeil was member of Landtag of Bavaria. In the negotiations to form a coalition government under Chancellor Angela Merkel following the 2009 federal elections on the national level, he was a member of the committee on economic affairs and energy, led by Karl-Theodor zu Guttenberg and Rainer Brüderle.

Zeil was a FDP delegate to the Federal Convention for the purpose of electing the President of Germany 2009, 2010 and 2012.

In Cabinet Seehofer I, Zeil served as Deputy Minister-President and State Minister for Economic Affairs, Infrastructure, Transport and Technology.

== Life after politics ==
Since leaving active politics, Zeil has been working with Munich-based law firm SLB Kloepper Rechtsanwälte. Ahead of the 2023 state elections, he sought his party's nomination for the Munich South district but ultimately lost against Marco Deutsch in an internal vote.

== Other activities ==
- Bayerische Eisenbahngesellschaft (BEG), Ex-Officio Member of the Supervisory Board (2008-2013)
- BayernLB, Ex-Officio Member of the Supervisory Board (2008-2013)
- LfA Förderbank Bayern, Ex-Officio Member of the Supervisory Board (2008-2013)
- ZDF, Member of the Television Board (2008-2013)

== Recognition ==
- 2013 – Order of the Star of Italy

== Personal life ==
Zeil is married to Barbara Daumiller-Zeil and has three children.
