= Helmut Brunner (politician) =

German politician (born 1954)

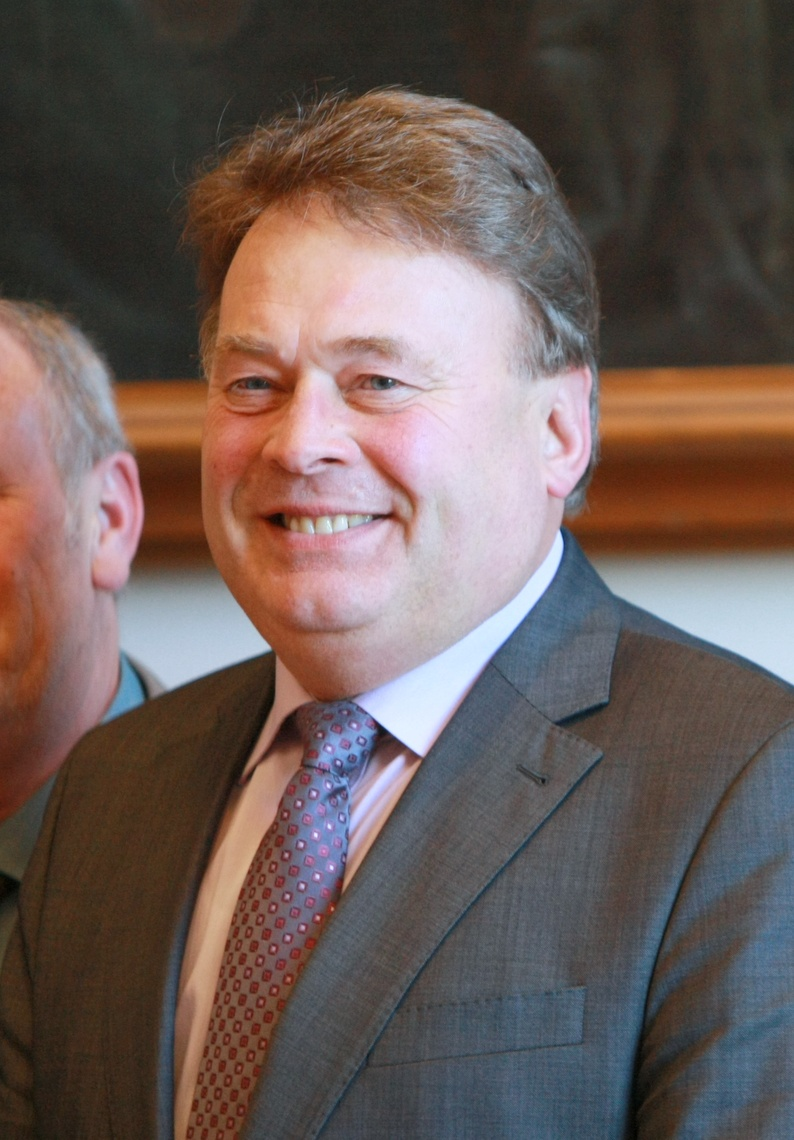
Brunner in 2011

Helmut Brunner (born 14 September 1954 in Kötzting) is a German politician, representative of the Christian Social Union of Bavaria. He became a member of the Landtag of Bavaria in 1994.

== See also ==
- List of Bavarian Christian Social Union politicians
