= Third Söder cabinet =

State government of Bavaria

Third Cabinet of Markus Söder Söder III
- 28th Cabinet of Bavaria
- 8 November 2023 –
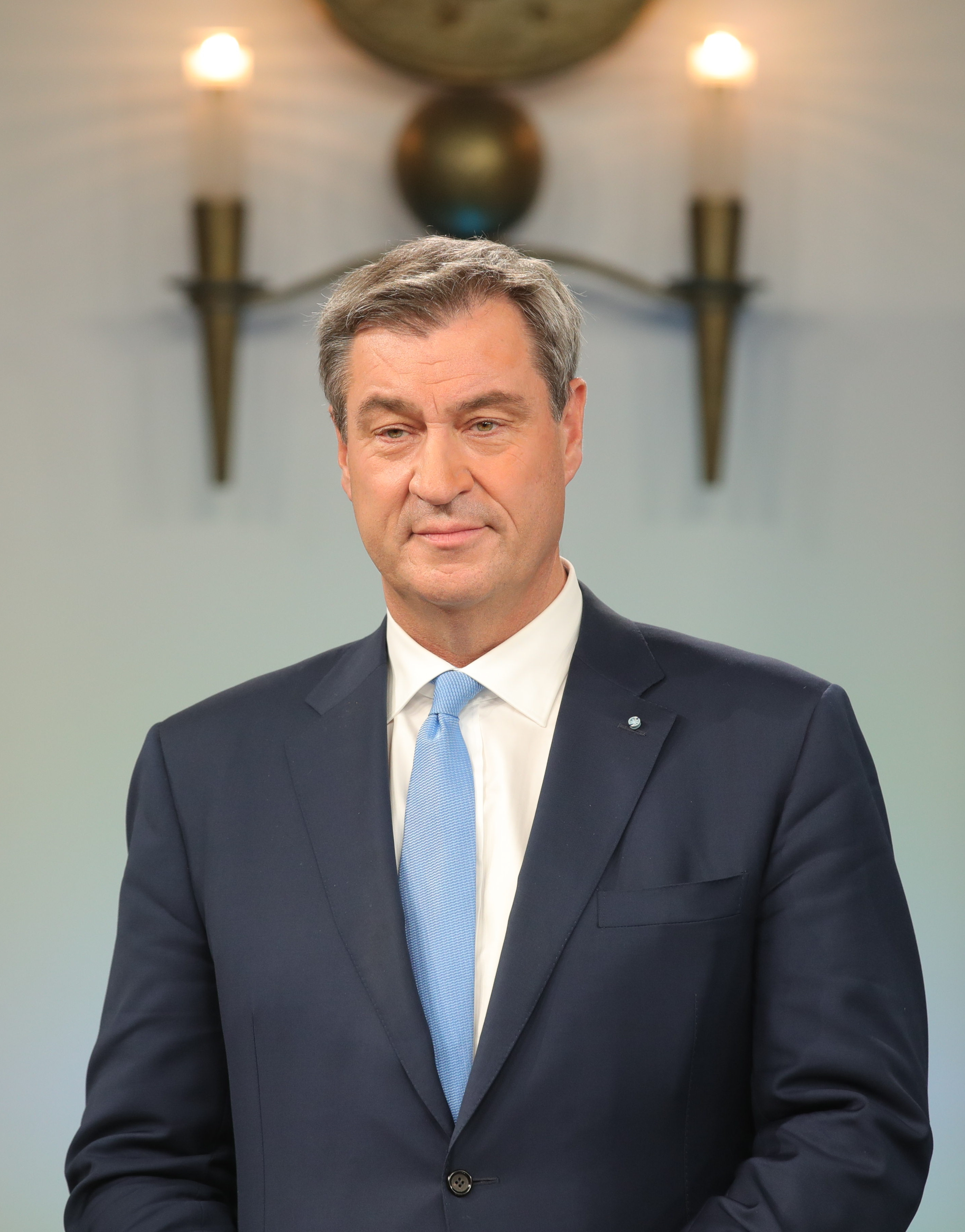
- Markus Söder on election night, 8 October 2023
- Date formed: Minister-President elected: 31 October 2023; Cabinet sworn in: 8 November 2023

People and organisations
- Minister-President: Markus Söder
- Deputy Minister-President: Hubert Aiwanger
- No. of ministers: 14
- Member parties: Christian Social Union; Free Voters of Bavaria
- Status in legislature: Coalition government (Majority)
- Opposition parties: Alternative for Germany; Alliance 90/The Greens; Social Democratic Party

History
- Election: 2023 Bavarian state election
- Legislature term: 19th Landtag of Bavaria
- Predecessor: Second Söder cabinet

The Third Söder cabinet was sworn in on 8 November 2023, following Markus Söder's re-election as Minister-President of Bavaria by the members of the Landtag of Bavaria on 31 October 2023. It is the 28th Cabinet of Bavaria.

== Formation ==
Markus Söder was re-elected Minister-President by the Landtag on 31 October 2023, with 120 votes for, 76 votes against, and two abstentions. The Christian Social Union and Free Voters of Bavaria coalition has 122 of the 203 seats.

== Composition ==
Portfolio	Minister	Party	Took office	Left office	State secretary
Minister-President	Markus Söder	CSU	31 October 2023		
Deputy Minister-President Minister for Economics, State Development and Energy	Hubert Aiwanger	FW	8 November 2023	4 November 2026 (died in office)	Tobias Gotthardt
Additional Deputy Minister-President Minister for Family, Work and Social	Ulrike Scharf	CSU	8 November 2023		
Head of the State Chancellery and Minister of State for Federal Affairs and Media	Florian Herrmann	CSU	8 November 2023		
Minister of Interior, Sport and Integration	Joachim Herrmann	CSU	8 November 2023		Sandro Kirchner
Minister for Housing, Construction and Transport	Christian Bernreiter	CSU	8 November 2023		
Minister of Justice	Georg Eisenreich	CSU	8 November 2023		
Minister for Education and Culture	Anna Stolz	FW	8 November 2023		
Minister for Science and Art	Markus Blume	CSU	8 November 2023		
Minister of Finance and Homeland	Albert Füracker	CSU	8 November 2023		Martin Schöffel
Minister for Environment and Consumer Protection	Thorsten Glauber	FW	8 November 2023		
Minister for Food, Agriculture, Forestry and Tourism	Michaela Kaniber	CSU	8 November 2023		
Minister for Health, Care and Prevention	Judith Gerlach	CSU	8 November 2023		
Minister for Digital	Fabian Mehring	FW	8 November 2023		
Minister for European and International Affairs in the State Chancellery	Eric Beißwenger	CSU	8 November 2023		
