= Second Söder cabinet =

State government of Bavaria

Second Cabinet of Markus Söder Söder II
- 27th Cabinet of Bavaria
- 12 November 2018 – 7 November 2023
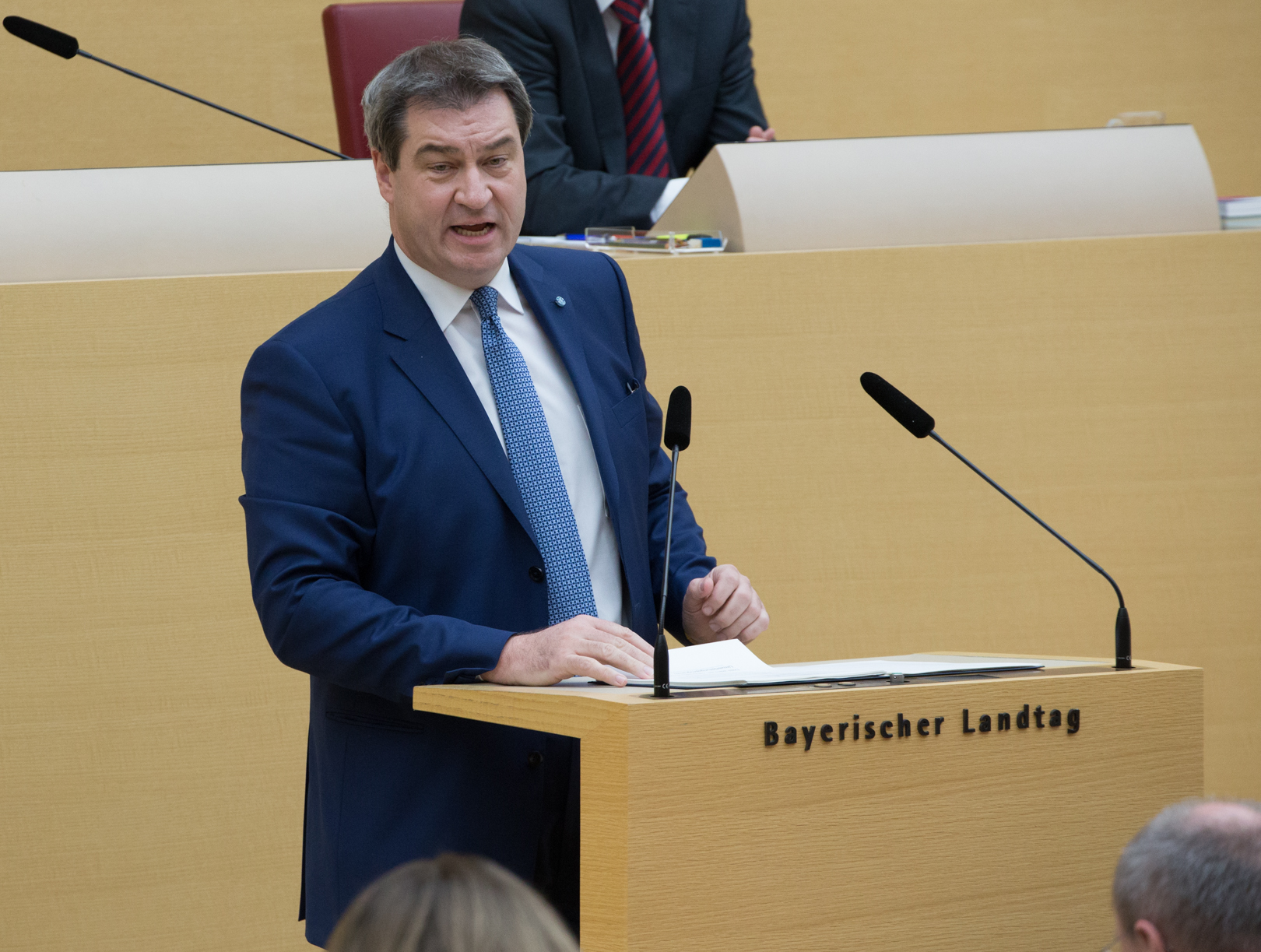
- Markus Söder at the Landtag of Bavaria plenary session in December 2018
- Date formed: 12 November 2018
- Date dissolved: 7 November 2023

People and organisations
- Minister-President: Markus Söder
- Deputy Minister-President: Hubert Aiwanger
- No. of ministers: 15
- Member parties: Christian Social Union; Free Voters of Bavaria
- Status in legislature: Coalition government (Majority)
- Opposition parties: Alliance 90/The Greens; Alternative for Germany; Social Democratic Party; Free Democratic Party

History
- Election: 2018 Bavarian state election
- Legislature term: 18th Landtag of Bavaria
- Predecessor: First Söder cabinet
- Successor: Third Söder cabinet

The Second Söder cabinet was the state government of Bavaria from November 2018 to late 2023. It was sworn in on 12 November 2018, after Markus Söder was elected as Minister-President of Bavaria by the members of the Landtag of Bavaria. It was the 27th Cabinet of Bavaria.

It was formed after the 2018 Bavarian state election, by the Christian Social Union (CSU) and Free Voters (FW). Excluding the Minister-President, the cabinet comprised fourteen ministers and three state secretaries. Eleven ministers and two state secretaries were members of the CSU and three ministers and one state secretary were members of the Free Voters.

== Formation ==
The previous cabinet was a majority government of the CSU led by Minister-President Markus Söder, who took office in March 2018.

The election took place on 14 October 2018; it resulted in the CSU losing its absolute majority and recording its worst result since 1950. The Greens improved from fourth to second place with 18% of the vote while the SPD lost more than half its vote share and dropped from second to fifth. The Free Voters remained the third-largest party with 12% of the vote, an improvement of two and a half percentage points. The AfD debuted at 10%; the FDP re-entered the Landtag with 5%.

The CSU met with each party except the AfD, initially expressing interest in both The Greens and Free Voters. On 18 October, they announced they would seek a coalition with the Free Voters. Söder stated that The Greens differed too much from the CSU on refugee and domestic security policy, while the FW held agreeable positions on important issues.

Coalition negotiations between the CSU and FW were finalised on 2 November, and both parties approved the agreement on 4 November.

Söder was elected as Minister-President by the Landtag on 8 November, winning 110 votes out of 202 cast. The new cabinet took office on 12 November.

== Composition ==
Portfolio	Minister	Party	Took office	Left office	State secretary
Minister-President	Markus Söder born 5 January 1967 (age 59)	CSU	8 November 2018	7 November 2023	
Deputy Minister-President Minister for Economics, State Development and Energy	Hubert Aiwanger born 26 January 1971 (age 55)	FW	12 November 2018	7 November 2023	Roland Weigert
Minister for Interior, Sport and Integration	Joachim Herrmann born 21 September 1956 (age 69)	CSU	12 November 2018	7 November 2023	Sandro Kirchner
Head of the Bavarian State Chancellery and Minister of State for Federal Affairs and Media	Florian Herrmann born 7 December 1971 (age 54)	CSU	12 November 2018	7 November 2023	
Minister for Housing, Construction and Transport	Hans Reichhart born 20 June 1982 (age 43)	CSU	12 November 2018	1 February 2020	
Minister for Housing, Construction and Transport	Christian Bernreiter born 7 April 1964 (age 62)	CSU	23 February 2022	7 November 2023	
Minister for Justice	Georg Eisenreich born 6 December 1970 (age 55)	CSU	12 November 2018	7 November 2023	
Minister for Teaching and Education	Michael Piazolo born 22 October 1959 (age 66)	FW	12 November 2018	7 November 2023	Anna Stolz
Minister for Science and Art	Bernd Sibler born 19 February 1971 (age 55)	CSU	12 November 2018	23 February 2022	
Minister for Science and Art	Markus Blume born 14 February 1975 (age 51)	CSU	23 February 2022	7 November 2023	
Minister for Finance and Homeland	Albert Füracker born 3 February 1968 (age 58)	CSU	12 November 2018	7 November 2023	
Minister for Environment and Consumer Protection	Thorsten Glauber born 21 November 1970 (age 55)	FW	12 November 2018	7 November 2023	
Minister for Food, Agriculture and Forestry	Michaela Kaniber born 14 September 1977 (age 48)	CSU	12 November 2018	7 November 2023	
Minister for Family, Labour and Social Affairs	Kerstin Schreyer born 29 June 1971 (age 54)	CSU	12 November 2018	6 February 2020	Carolina Trautner
Minister for Family, Labour and Social Affairs	Carolina Trautner born 25 May 1961 (age 65)	CSU	6 February 2020	23 February 2022	
Minister for Family, Labour and Social Affairs	Ulrike Scharf born 16 December 1967 (age 58)	CSU	23 February 2022	7 November 2023	
Minister of State for European and International Affairs in the State Chancellery	Melanie Huml born 9 September 1975 (age 50)	CSU	11 January 2021	7 November 2023	
Minister for Health and Care	Melanie Huml born 9 September 1975 (age 50)	CSU	12 November 2018	10 January 2021	Klaus Holetschek
Minister for Health and Care	Klaus Holetschek born 21 October 1964 (age 61)	CSU	11 January 2021	7 November 2023	
Minister for Digital Affairs	Judith Gerlach born 3 November 1985 (age 40)	CSU	12 November 2018	7 November 2023	
