= First Söder cabinet =

Government of Bavaria March-November 2018

First Cabinet of Markus Söder Söder I
- 27th Cabinet of Bavaria
- 21 March 2018 – 6 November 2018
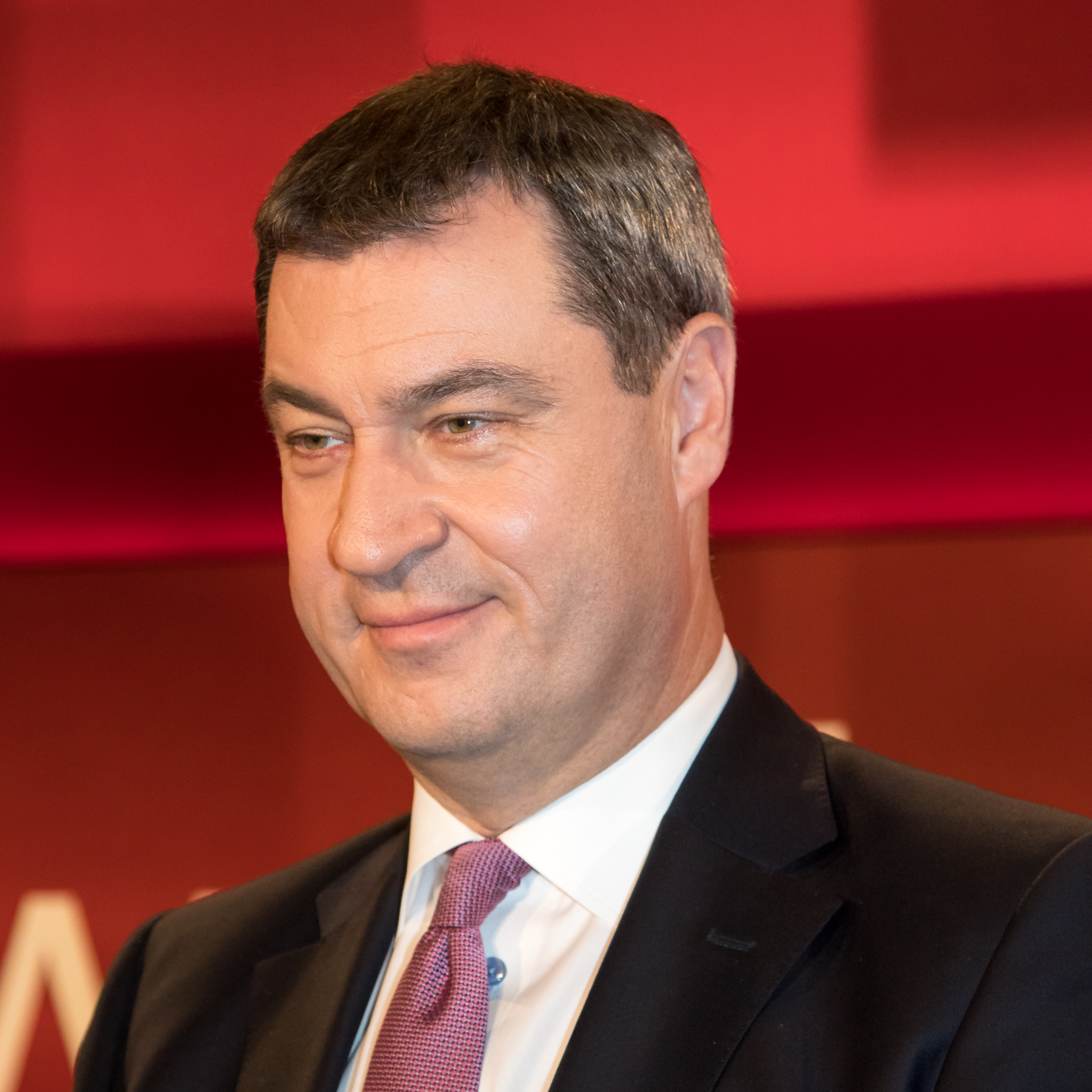
- Markus Söder in January 2017
- Date formed: 21 March 2018
- Date dissolved: 6 November 2018

People and organisations
- Minister-President: Markus Söder
- Deputy Minister-President: Ilse Aigner; Joachim Herrmann
- No. of ministers: 13
- Member parties: Christian Social Union
- Status in legislature: Majority government
- Opposition parties: Social Democratic Party; Free Voters; Alliance 90/The Greens

History
- Election: None
- Legislature term: 17th Landtag of Bavaria
- Predecessor: Second Seehofer cabinet
- Successor: Second Söder cabinet

The First Söder cabinet was the state government of Bavaria from March to November 2018, sworn in on 21 March 2018 after Markus Söder was elected as Minister-President of Bavaria by the members of the Landtag of Bavaria. It was the 26th Cabinet of Bavaria.

It was formed after the resignation of Minister-President Horst Seehofer to become Federal Minister of the Interior, Building and Community; it was a continuation of the Christian Social Union (CSU) majority government formed after the 2013 Bavarian state election. Excluding the Minister-President, the cabinet comprised thirteen ministers and four state secretaries. All were members of the CSU.

The first Söder CSU-only cabinet was succeeded by the coalition second Söder cabinet on 12 November 2018 following the 2018 Bavarian state election.

== Formation ==
The previous cabinet was a majority government of the CSU led by Minister-President Horst Seehofer of the CSU. After the CSU suffered heavy losses in the 2017 German federal election, Seehofer announced he planned to resign as Minister-President in early 2018 and have the office to his finance minister Markus Söder. In March 2018, he announced his switch to federal politics after being nominated as Minister of the Interior in the fourth Merkel cabinet. Seehofer formally resigned on 13 March.

Söder was elected as Minister-President by the Landtag on 16 March, winning 99 votes out of 169 cast. His cabinet was sworn in on 21 March.

== Composition ==
Portfolio	Minister	Party	Took office	Left office	State secretary
Minister-President	Markus Söder born 5 January 1967 (age 59)	CSU	16 March 2018	6 November 2018	
Deputy Minister-President Minister for Housing, Construction and Transport	Ilse Aigner born 7 December 1964 (age 61)	CSU	21 March 2018	11 November 2018	Josef Zellmeier
Minister for Interior and Integration	Joachim Herrmann born 21 September 1956 (age 69)	CSU	21 March 2018	11 November 2018	Gerhard Eck
Head of the Bavarian State Chancellery and Minister of State for Federal Affairs	Florian Herrmann born 7 December 1971 (age 54)	CSU	21 March 2018	11 November 2018	
Minister of State for Digital Affairs, Media and Europe in the State Chancellery	Georg Eisenreich born 6 December 1970 (age 55)	CSU	21 March 2018	11 November 2018	
Minister for Justice	Winfried Bausback born 22 October 1965 (age 60)	CSU	21 March 2018	11 November 2018	
Minister for Teaching and Education	Bernd Sibler born 19 February 1971 (age 55)	CSU	21 March 2018	11 November 2018	Carolina Trautner
Minister for Science and Art	Marion Kiechle born 4 April 1960 (age 66)	CSU	21 March 2018	11 November 2018	
Minister for Finance, State Development and Homeland	Albert Füracker born 3 February 1968 (age 58)	CSU	21 March 2018	11 November 2018	Hans Reichhart
Minister for Economics, Energy and Technology	Franz Pschierer born 1 July 1956 (age 69)	CSU	21 March 2018	11 November 2018	
Minister for Environment and Consumer Protection	Marcel Huber born 10 January 1958 (age 68)	CSU	21 March 2018	11 November 2018	
Minister for Food, Agriculture and Forestry	Michaela Kaniber born 14 September 1977 (age 48)	CSU	21 March 2018	11 November 2018	
Minister for Family, Labour and Social Affairs	Kerstin Schreyer born 29 June 1971 (age 54)	CSU	21 March 2018	11 November 2018	
Minister for Health and Care	Melanie Huml born 9 September 1975 (age 50)	CSU	21 March 2018	11 November 2018	
