= Florian Herrmann =

German politician

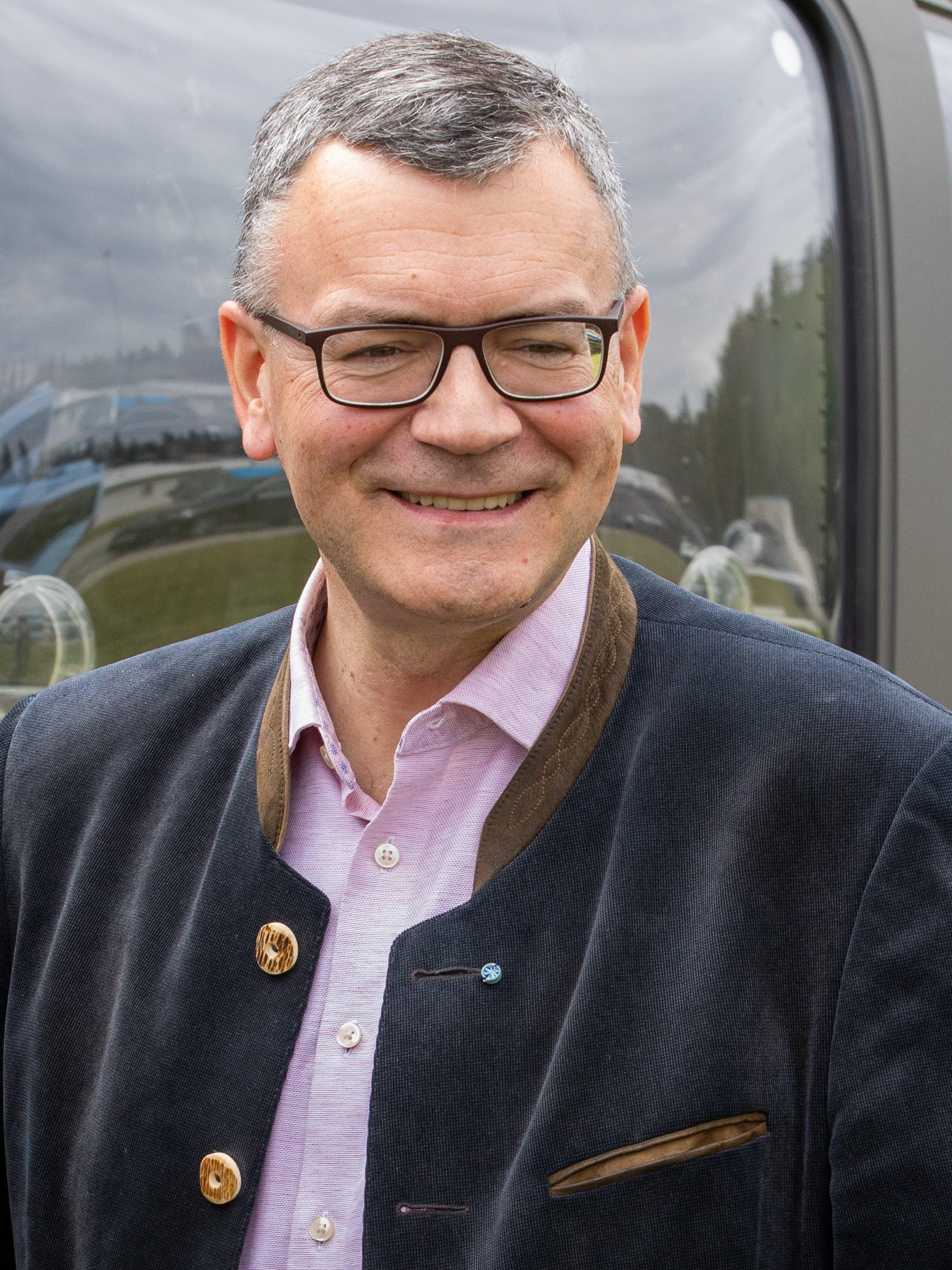

Head of the State Chancellery and Minister of State for Federal Affairs and Media
- Incumbent
- Assumed office 21 March 2018
- Prime Minister: Markus Söder
- Preceded by: Marcel Huber

Member of the Landtag of Bavaria for Freising
- Incumbent
- Assumed office 28 September 2008
- Preceded by: Otto Wiesheu

Personal details
- Born: 7 December 1971 (age 54) Kelheim, Bavaria, West Germany (now Germany)
- Party: CSU
- Spouse: Renate Thalhammer-Herrmann
- Education: LMU Munich; University of Pennsylvania; Goethe University Frankfurt
- Profession: Lawyer
- Website: florian-herrmann.de

Florian Herrmann (born 7 December 1971 in Kelheim) is a German lawyer and politician (CSU). He has been a member of the Bavarian State Parliament since 2008, Head of the Bavarian State Chancellery and Bavarian Minister of State for Federal and European Affairs and the Media since 2018, for Federal Affairs and the Media since 2021 and also for European Affairs and International Relations since October 2026.

== Life ==
=== Studies and career ===
After graduating from the Dom-Gymnasium Freising in 1991, Herrmann studied law at LMU Munich, the Goethe University Frankfurt and the University of Bonn. In 1996, he passed the first state examination in law at LMU with honors and completed the Master of Laws (LL.M.) program at the University of Pennsylvania in Philadelphia (US) in 1996/97.

He was then employed as part of a research project by the German Research Foundation with Michael Stolleis at the University of Frankfurt/Main and at the Max Planck Institute for European Legal History in Frankfurt am Main on a topic related to the history of international law (The standard work. Franz von Liszt and international law). After his legal clerkship in the Higher Regional Court district of Munich, he passed the Second State Examination in Law in 2001 with distinction. During his studies and his doctorate, Herrmann was a scholarship holder from the Cusanuswerk study grant.

Herrmann was admitted to the bar in 2001 and worked in a Munich law firm until he founded a law firm specializing in corporate law in 2003.

== Politics ==
=== Party ===
Herrmann joined the Christian Social Union in Bavaria in 1998. He began his political career in 1999 as managing director of the CSU local chapter in Freising. From 2003 to 2007 he was local chairman in Freising and deputy district chairman. He has been district chairman of the CSU in the district of Freising since 2007. From 2013 until 2021 Herrmann has been district chairman of the police and internal security working group of the CSU. Since 2013 he has also been a member of the party executive of the CSU. Herrmann is also chairman of the Media Commission of the CSU.

=== Local Politics ===
Herrmann has been a member of the district council of the Upper Bavarian district of Freising since 2002. From 2006 to 2018 he was chairman of the CSU district parliamentary group. In the local elections of 2002 he was the candidate of the CSU for the office of district administrator.

=== State Parliament ===
Since the 2008 Bavarian state election, Herrmann has been a directly elected member of the Bavarian state parliament for the electoral district of Freising, succeeding Otto Wiesheu. During his first term in office, he was a member of the Committee on Municipal Issues and Internal Security, the Committee on Constitutional Affairs, Law, Parliamentary Issues and Consumer Protection, and the Data Protection Commission. He was also a member of the BayernLB/HGAA investigative committee, of which he became chairman in March 2011 after the previous chairman, Thomas Kreuzer, had been appointed State Secretary in the Bavarian Ministry of Education. From December 2011 to October 2013 he was Vice-Chairman of the Committee on Municipal Affairs and Homeland Security.

He was a member of the 15th Federal Convention.

From April 2013 until its end in July 2013, he was chairman of the committee of inquiry into the Gustl Mollath case. In the state elections in Bavaria in 2013, he defended his electoral district. He was then elected chairman of the Committee on Municipal Affairs, Homeland Security and Sport. In the CSU state parliamentary group, he was a member of the parliamentary group executive committee, chairman of the working group for municipal issues, internal security and sport, and domestic policy spokesman for the group. He was also deputy chairman of the committee of inquiry "Modellbau". He was a member of the 16th Federal Convention.

=== Head of the State Chancellery and State Minister ===
On 21 March 2018, he was appointed Head of the Bavarian State Chancellery and Minister of State for Federal Affairs in the Bavarian Cabinet Söder I under Prime Minister Markus Söder. He has been a member of the German Federal Council since 17 April 2018.

In the 2018 state election, he defended his electoral district again. On 12 November 2018, he was reappointed to his previous ministerial post in the Söder II cabinet, which was expanded to include responsibilities for European affairs and the media. He has represented Bavaria in the European Committee of the Regions since 2019. After Melanie Huml was appointed Minister of State for European and International Affairs, he was no longer responsible for European affairs.

He was a member of the 17th Federal Convention. In the 2023 state election, he defended his electoral district again.

On 8 November 2023, he was reappointed to his previous ministerial post in the Söder III cabinet. On 30 September 2026, he also assumed responsibility for European affairs and international relations.

=== Civic engagement ===
Herrmann is a member of various local clubs. From 2001 to 2015 he was district chairman of the Europa-Union in the district of Freising and since 2005 he has been deputy chairman of the Freising training offensive e.V. 2009 he was elected chairman of the Community Foundation of the City of Freising, in 2021 he moved to the Board of Trustees. In 2010 he was appointed Vice President of the Landesverkehrswacht Bayern e.V.; from 2012 to 2020 he was its President. From 2013 to 2022 he was a member of the Board of Trustees of the Education Center Foundation of the Archdiocese of Munich and Freising. Since 2019 he has been a member of the board of trustees of the Munich School of Philosophy. Herrmann has been a member of the Advisory Board of the Foundation for Freedom of Belief and Security in Europe since 2023. Since 2024 he has been a member of the foundation council of the Munich Security Conference. In 2023 he was elected chairman of the Catholic Men's Association in Tuntenhausen. From 1985 to 1996 he was an honorary organist in Giggenhausen.

=== Personal ===
Herrmann is the son of the former President of the Technical University of Munich, Wolfgang Herrmann. He is Roman Catholic and lives in Freising with his wife Renate.

== Awards ==
- Medal of Honor of the Association of German Criminal Investigators (BDK), Bavarian State Association (2017)
- Meritorious Public Service Medal of the United States Army (2021)
- Medal of merits to local self-government in bronze (2021)
- Bavarian Order of Merit (2022)
- Bavarian Porcelain Lion (Award of the Bavarian State Group of the German Armed Forces Reservists Association (Verband der Reservisten der Deutschen Bundeswehr e.V.)) (2025)
- Gold Cross of Honour of the Bundeswehr (2026)

== Publications ==
- Herrmann, Florian (2001). Das Standardwerk. Franz von Liszt und das Völkerrecht (in German). Baden-Baden: Nomos Verl.-Ges. ISBN 3-7890-7296-6.

== See also ==
- Cabinet Söder I
- Cabinet Söder II
- Cabinet Söder III
