= 2028 Bavarian state election =

German state election

Next Bavarian state election
- 2028

All 180 seats in the Landtag of Bavaria (including any overhang and leveling seats) 91 seats needed for a majority
Party	CSU	FW	AfD
Last election	85 seats, 37.0%	37 seats, 15.8%	32 seats, 14.6%
Party	Greens	SPD
Last election	32 seats, 14.4%	17 seats, 8.4%
Incumbent Government
Third Söder cabinet
CSU—FW

The next Bavaria state election will be held in the autumn of 2028 or earlier, in order to elect the members of the 20th Landtag of Bavaria.

== Electoral system ==
The Landtag is elected using mixed-member proportional representation. Every voter has two votes, one for a candidate in their local constituency and one for a candidate in their regional district. Both votes are taken into account in the allocation of seats according to proportional representation. The election law was changed in 2022 to use the Sainte-Laguë method. There is no state-wide proportional representation; regional seats are allocated within the seven administrative districts, which are referred to as "constituencies" (Wahlkreise) in the constitution. The regional seats are allocated in an open-list fashion, according to votes cast for candidates.

Only parties and electoral groups that win at least 5% of the total votes across Bavaria (sum of first and second votes, meaning party votes and local district contest votes) participate in the allocation of seats. The regional "constituencies" are divided into local "electoral districts" (Stimmkreise), in each of which one MP is directly elected by getting plurality in the first (only) round.

The number of local "electoral districts" (91) is about equal to the number of seats in the regional "constituencies" (89). The number of seats may be increased if overhang seats occur. In that event, levelling seats are added in the regional constituency.

== Background ==
In the 2023 Bavarian state elections, the CSU emerged once again as the leading party. The Free Voters and AfD saw significant increases in their voter support, securing the second and third positions, respectively. Conversely, the Greens experienced a decline, losing nearly 3 percentage points, which relegated them to the fourth spot. The SPD, despite further vote losses, retained its position as the fifth strongest party. The FDP, with a decrease of 2 percentage points, failed to secure enough votes to re-enter the state parliament. Neither the ÖDP nor the Left Party managed to surpass the five percent threshold required for representation.

Following the election, the coalition between the CSU and the Free Voters was continued, forming the Cabinet Söder III.

== Opinion polls ==
=== Graphical summary ===
Local regression graphical polling

=== Party polling ===
Polling firm	Fieldwork date	Sample size	CSU	FW	AfD	Grüne	SPD	FDP	Linke	BP	BSW	Others	Lead
Infratest dimap	17–19 Oct 2026	1,089	36	9	21	15	8	–	4	–	–	7	15
GMS	14–19 Oct 2026	1,011	37	10	22	15	6	2	3	–	–	5	15
Civey	2–16 Oct 2026	5,000	38	12	18	13	7	2	3	–	2	5	20
Civey	27 Aug – 10 Sep 2026	5,000	38	12	20	13	6	2	3	–	3	3	18
Civey	30 Jul – 13 Aug 2026	5,000	38	12	20	13	6	2	3	–	3	3	18
Civey	2–17 Jul 2026	5,000	37	12	19	14	6	2	3	–	3	4	18
Civey	28 May – 12 Jun 2026	5,000	38	12	19	14	6	2	3	–	3	3	19
Civey	29 Apr – 13 May 2026	5,000	37	12	19	14	7	2	3	–	3	3	18
Civey	3–17 Apr 2026	5,000	38	11	19	13	7	2	3	–	3	4	19
Civey	26 Feb – 12 Mar 2026	5,000	39	11	17	12	8	2	3	–	3	5	22
GMS	25 Feb – 3 Mar 2026	1,003	39	10	18	13	7	2	3	1	2	5	21
Civey	29 Jan – 12 Feb 2026	5,000	40	12	18	11	7	2	3	–	1	6	22
Civey	1–15 Jan 2026	5,000	40	11	18	12	7	2	3	–	1	6	22
Infratest dimap	8–12 Jan 2026	1,177	39	9	19	13	8	–	3	–	–	9	20
GMS	23 Dec – 5 Jan 2026	1,006	39	12	19	11	6	2	3	1	2	5	20
Civey	27 Nov – 11 Dec 2025	5,000	37	10	21	12	8	2	4	–	2	4	16
GMS	5–10 Dec 2025	1,005	40	10	19	12	6	2	3	–	2	6	21
Civey	30 Oct – 13 Nov 2025	5,000	40	9	20	12	8	1	5	–	2	3	20
Civey	24 Sep – 8 Oct 2025	5,000	38	10	20	11	8	2	4	–	2	5	18
GMS	24–29 Sep 2025	1,017	39	11	19	11	7	2	4	1	2	5	20
Civey	29 Aug – 12 Sep 2025	5,000	40	10	20	13	8	1	1	–	2	5	20
Forsa	1–10 Sep 2025	1,012	37	10	19	15	8	2	5	–	1	3	18
Civey	30 Jul – 14 Aug 2025	5,000	41	9	20	13	8	1	1	–	2	5	21
Civey	25 Jun – 10 Jul 2025	5,002	37	10	22	12	7	2	1	–	3	6	15
Civey	30 May – 13 Jun 2025	5,001	39	9	22	12	7	2	1	–	3	5	17
Civey	25 Apr – 14 May 2025	5,004	39	9	19	12	8	2	2	–	4	5	20
Civey	28 Mar – 11 Apr 2025	5,006	39	10	18	12	8	2	2	–	4	4	21
Civey	28 Feb – 14 Mar 2025	5,006	41	11	15	13	8	2	2	–	4	5	26
Federal Parliament election	23 Feb 2025	–	37.2	4.3	19.0	12.0	11.6	4.2	5.7	0.2	3.1	2.9	18.2
Civey	30 Jan – 13 Feb 2025	5,007	41	12	14	14	8	1	1	–	4	5	27
Civey	3–17 Jan 2025	5,011	43	12	14	14	7	1	1	–	3	5	29
Civey	28 Nov – 12 Dec 2024	5,001	42	12	14	12	7	3	1	–	4	5	28
Civey	1–15 Nov 2024	5,008	44	11	12	11	8	2	1	–	4	7	32
Civey	11–18 Oct 2024	5,001	42	12	14	11	7	3	1	–	–	10	28
INSA	7–14 Oct 2024	1,000	43	11	18	10	8	–	–	–	5	5	25
GMS	11–16 Sep 2024	1,048	42	11	12	10	7	2	1	2	6	7	30
Civey	5–12 Sep 2024	5,002	42	13	15	12	7	2	1	–	–	8	27
Civey	9–16 Aug 2024	5,002	42	13	14	11	8	3	1	–	–	8	28
Forsa	22 Jul – 2 Aug 2024	1,036	43	12	13	11	8	2	–	–	4	7	30
Civey	11–18 Jul 2024	5,004	42	13	14	11	8	3	1	–	–	8	28
Civey	7–14 Jun 2024	5,004	41	13	14	13	8	3	1	–	–	7	27
European Parliament election	9 Jun 2024	6,324,011	39.7	6.8	12.6	11.8	8.9	3.9	1.4	–	3.8	11.1	27.1
Civey	3–10 May 2024	5,005	41	14	14	13	7	3	1	–	–	7	27
GMS	30 Apr – 6 May 2024	1,023	41	15	11	13	7	2	2	1	3	5	26
Civey	4–11 Apr 2024	5,002	42	14	13	13	7	3	1	–	–	7	28
Civey	8–15 Mar 2024	5,001	42	14	13	14	7	2	1	–	–	7	28
Civey	9–16 Feb 2024	5,001	40	13	14	14	8	3	1	–	–	7	26
GMS	31 Jan – 5 Feb 2024	1,018	42	15	13	12	6	2	1	1	3	5	27
Infratest dimap	11–15 Jan 2024	1,161	40	13	15	13	7	3	–	–	–	9	25
Civey	4–11 Jan 2024	5,000	41	13	14	14	8	3	2	–	–	5	27
GMS	27 Dec – 2 Jan 2024	1,002	41	16	14	13	6	3	1	1	–	5	25
Civey	8–15 Dec 2023	4,999	41	13	14	14	8	3	2	–	–	5	27
Civey	10–17 Nov 2023	5,001	40	13	13	14	9	3	2	–	–	6	26
2023 state election	8 Oct 2023	–	37.0	15.8	14.6	14.4	8.4	3.0	1.5	0.9	–	4.2	21.2
