= Cabinet Söder =

Cabinet Söder is the name of any of two cabinets in the German state of Bavaria led by Markus Söder:

- Cabinet Söder I (2018)
- Cabinet Söder II (2018–present)
