= Bernreiter =

Bernreiter is a surname. Notable people with the surname include:

- Christian Bernreiter (born 1964), German engineer and politician of the Christian Social Union (CSU)
- Franz Bernreiter (born 1954), German former biathlete.
