= Kaniber =

Kaniber is a surname. Notable people with the surname include:

- Michaela Kaniber (born 1977), German politician
- Wolfgang Kaniber (1939–2021), German footballer
