= Anna Stolz =

German politician (born 1982)

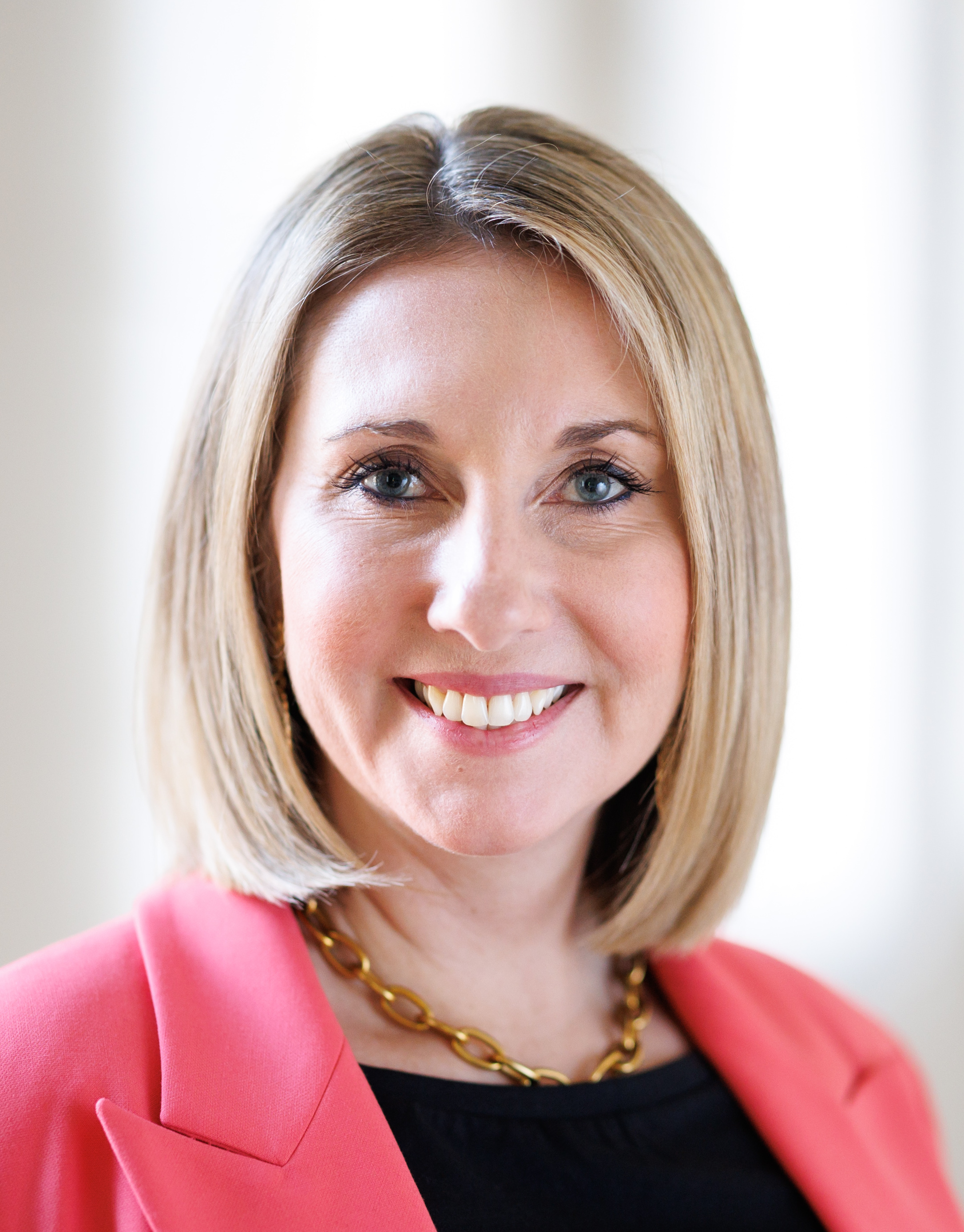
- Stolz in 2024

Minister of Education and Culture of Bavaria
- Incumbent
- Assumed office 8 November 2023
- Minister-President: Markus Söder
- Preceded by: Michael Piazolo

Personal details
- Born: 4 November 1982 (age 43) Werneck
- Party: Free Voters (since 2018)

Anna Stolz (born 4 November 1982 in Werneck) is a German politician serving as minister of education and culture of Bavaria since 2023. She has been a member of the Landtag of Bavaria since 2018. From 2014 to 2018, she served as mayor of Arnstein.
