= Melanie Huml =

German physician and politician

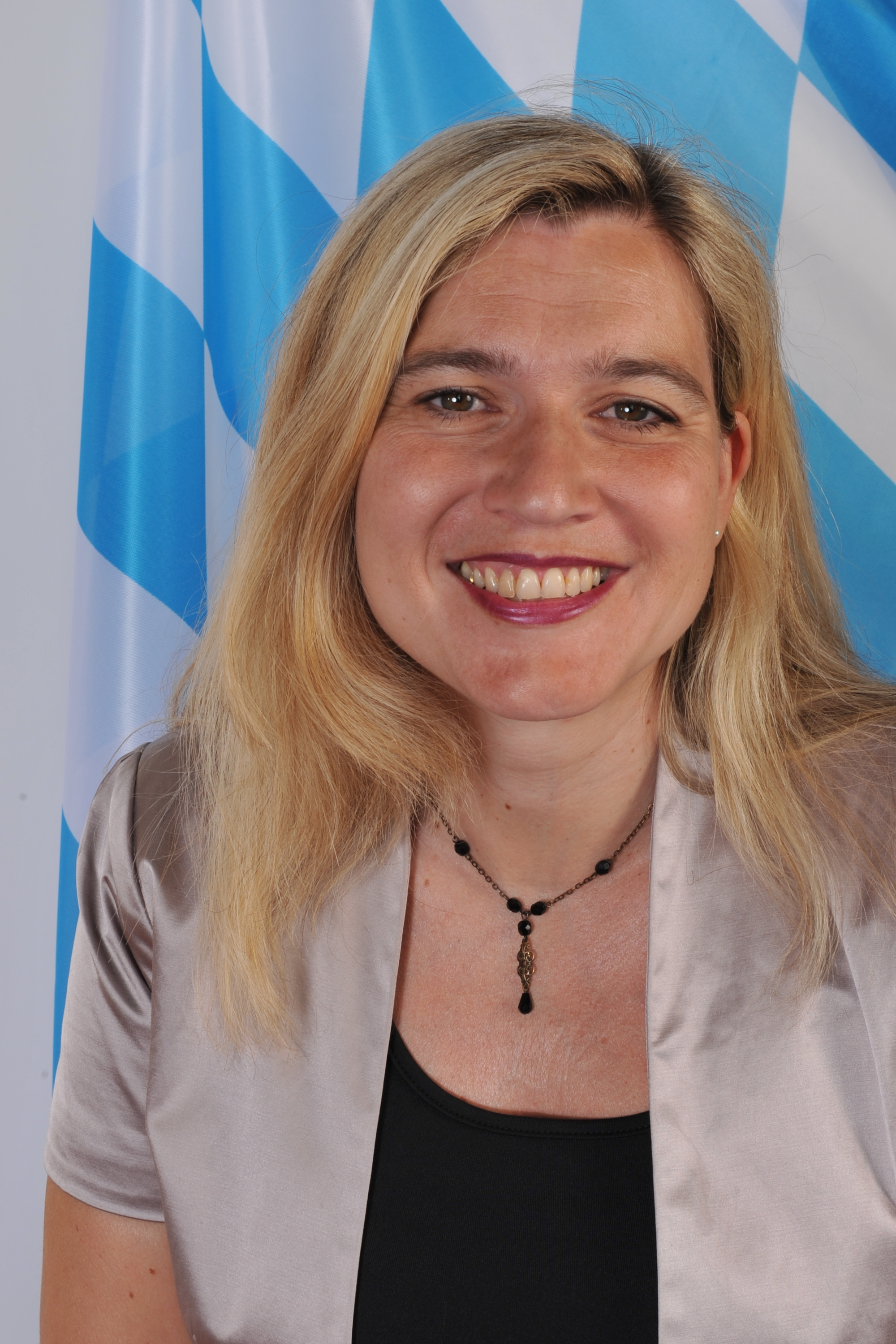

State Minister for European and International Affairs
- Incumbent
- Assumed office 11 January 2021
- Minister President: Markus Söder
- Preceded by: Florian Herrmann

Deputy Leader of the Christian Social Union in Bavaria
- Incumbent
- Assumed office 16 December 2017 Serving with Manfred Weber, Dorothee Bär, Angelika Niebler and Martin Sailer
- Leader: Horst Seehofer; Markus Söder
- Succeeded by: Barbara Stamm

State Minister for Health and Care
- In office 10 October 2013 – 11 January 2021
- Minister President: Markus Söder
- Preceded by: Marcel Huber
- Succeeded by: Klaus Holetschek

Member of the Landtag of Bavaria for Bamberg-Stadt
- Incumbent
- Assumed office 28 September 2008
- Preceded by: Constituency established

Member of the Landtag of Bavaria for Upper Franconia
- In office 21 September 2003 – 28 September 2008
- Constituency: Regional Party List

Personal details
- Born: 9 September 1975 (age 51) Bamberg, Bavaria, West Germany (now Germany)
- Party: Christian Social Union
- Spouse: Markus Huml
- Profession: Physician; Politician

Melanie Huml (née Beck; born 9 September 1975) is a German physician and politician of the Christian Social Union of Bavaria (CSU) who has been serving as State Minister for European and International Affairs in the cabinet of Minister-President Markus Söder since 2021. She has been a member of the Landtag of Bavaria since October 2003.

Prior to her current role in Bavaria's state government, Huml served as State Minister for Health and Nursing in the cabinets of successive Minister-Presidents Horst Seehofer (2013-2018) and Söder (2018–2021). She also served as State Secretary for the Ministry of Labor and Social Affairs, Family and Women from 2007 to 2008, and later served as State Secretary for the Ministry of Environment and Health from 2008 to 2013.

== Early life ==
Huml was born to Michael and Marianne Beck in 1975 in Bamberg, Bavaria. After completing primary school in Hallstadt, she attended Kaiser-Heinrich-Gymnasium Bamberg (KHG) until graduating in 1995. She subsequently studied human medicine at the University of Erlangen-Nuremberg. Huml became a licensed doctor by graduation on 1 October 2004. She has not completed any "Weiterbildung zum Facharzt" (German medical specialty training after medical school) so far.

== Political career ==
=== Career in state politics ===
In 1993, Huml began her political career as a member of the Young Union (JU), the youth organization of the CSU and its sister party, the Christian Democratic Union, and served as a member of the State Committee of the Bavarian Youth Union from 2003 to 2001. She joined the CSU in 2001 and has been a member of the district board of Upper Franconia since 2003.

In the 2003 state election, Huml was elected to the Landtag of Bavaria in the constituency of Upper Franconia. In the Landtag, she served as a member of the Committee for Social, Health and Family Policy until 2007.

In October 2007, Huml was appointed by Minister-President Günther Beckstein as Secretary of State for the Ministry of Labor and Social Affairs, Family and Women in his Cabinet. Starting in May 2008, she concurrently held a position on the City Council of Bamberg, a body she would serve on until April 2014. She has represented the constituency of Bamberg City in the Landtag since 2008 as a result of that year's state election.

Newly elected Minister-President Horst Seehofer appointed Huml as Secretary of State for the Ministry of Environment and Health in October 2008, a position she would hold until her appointment as Minister of Health and Nursing in 2013.

Since 2017, Huml has been serving as one of five deputy chairs of the CSU, under the leadership of chairmen Horst Seehofer (2017–2019) and Markus Söder (since 2019).

Under Huml's leadership, Bavaria confirmed Germany's first cases of COVID-19 in late January 2020. By July 2020, she oversaw the government's effort to make free testing available to all residents and invest 200 million euros to expand laboratory capacity, both public and private.

As part of a cabinet reshuffle following criticism of Huml's crisis management during the pandemic, Söder replace her with Klaus Holetschek and instead appointed her State Minister for European and International Affairs.

=== Role in national politics ===
Huml was a CSU delegate to the Federal Convention for the purpose of electing the President of Germany in 2004 and 2009.

As one of the state's representatives at the Bundesrat, Huml is a member of the Health Committee. She is also a member of the German-French Friendship Group set up by the German Bundesrat and the French Senate, the German-Russian Friendship Group set up in cooperation with the Russian Federation Council, and the German-Polish Friendship Group set up in cooperation with the Senate of Poland.

In the negotiations to form a coalition government under the leadership of Chancellor Angela Merkel following the 2013 federal elections, Huml was part of the CDU/CSU delegation in the working group on health policy, led by Jens Spahn and Karl Lauterbach. In similar negotiations following the 2017 federal elections, she was again part of the working group on health policy, this time led by Hermann Gröhe, Georg Nüßlein and Malu Dreyer.

== Other activities ==
- European Academy of Bavaria, Member of the Board of Trustees
- Hanns Seidel Foundation, Member
- University of Bamberg, Chairwoman of the Board of Trustees

== Personal life ==
Huml has been married to attorney Markus Huml since May 2005 and is the mother of two sons, born in 2012 and 2015, respectively. She is a Roman Catholic.
