= Tobias Gotthardt =

German politician (born 1977)

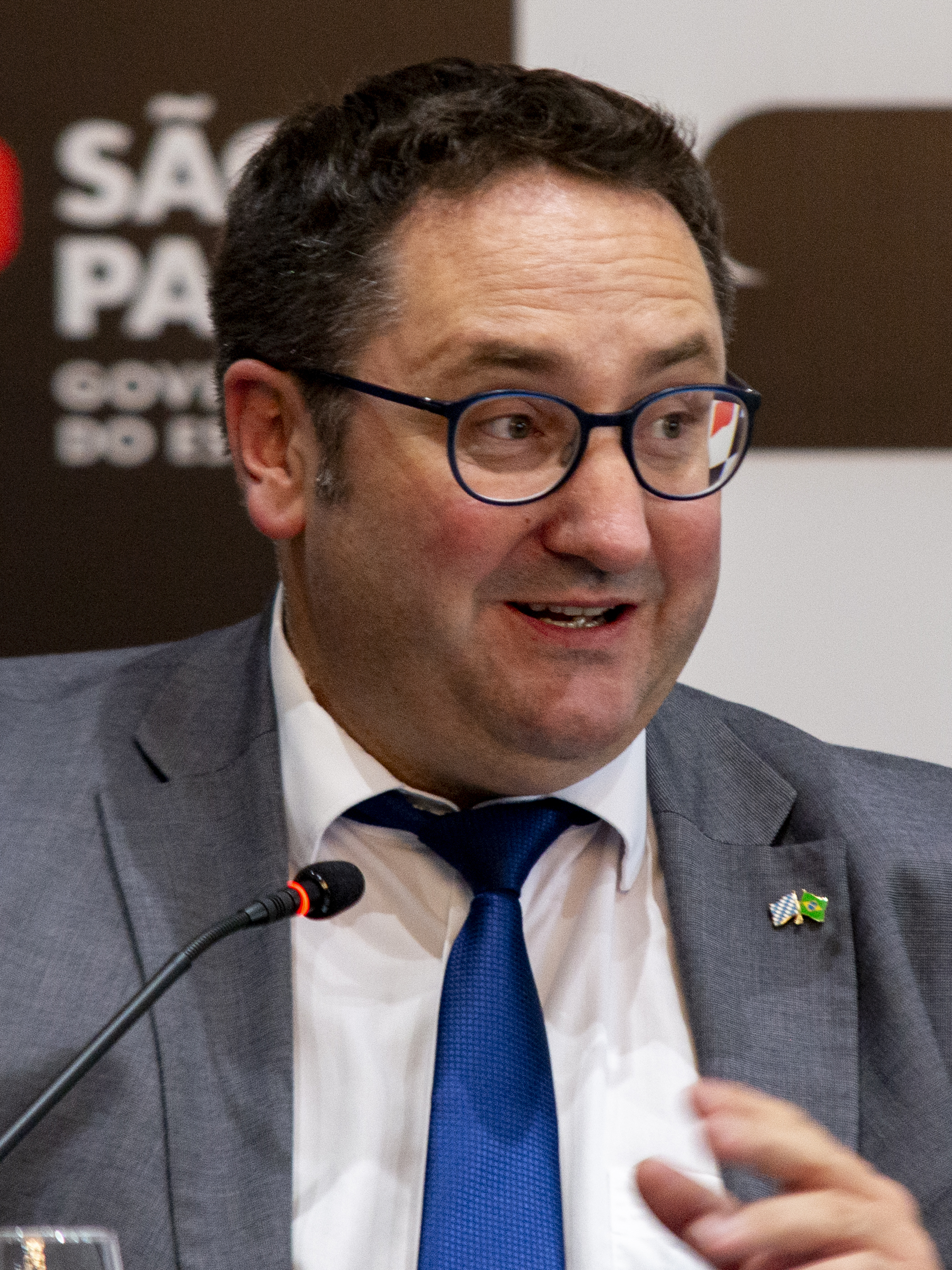
- Gotthardt in 2024

Member of the Landtag of Bavaria
- Incumbent
- Assumed office 5 November 2018
- Constituency: Upper Palatinate

Personal details
- Born: 3 June 1977 (age 48)
- Party: Free Voters of Bavaria

Tobias Gotthardt (born 3 June 1977) is a German politician serving as a member of the Landtag of Bavaria since 2018. He has served as state secretary for economic affairs, regional development and energy of Bavaria since 2023.
