= Thorsten Glauber =

German politician

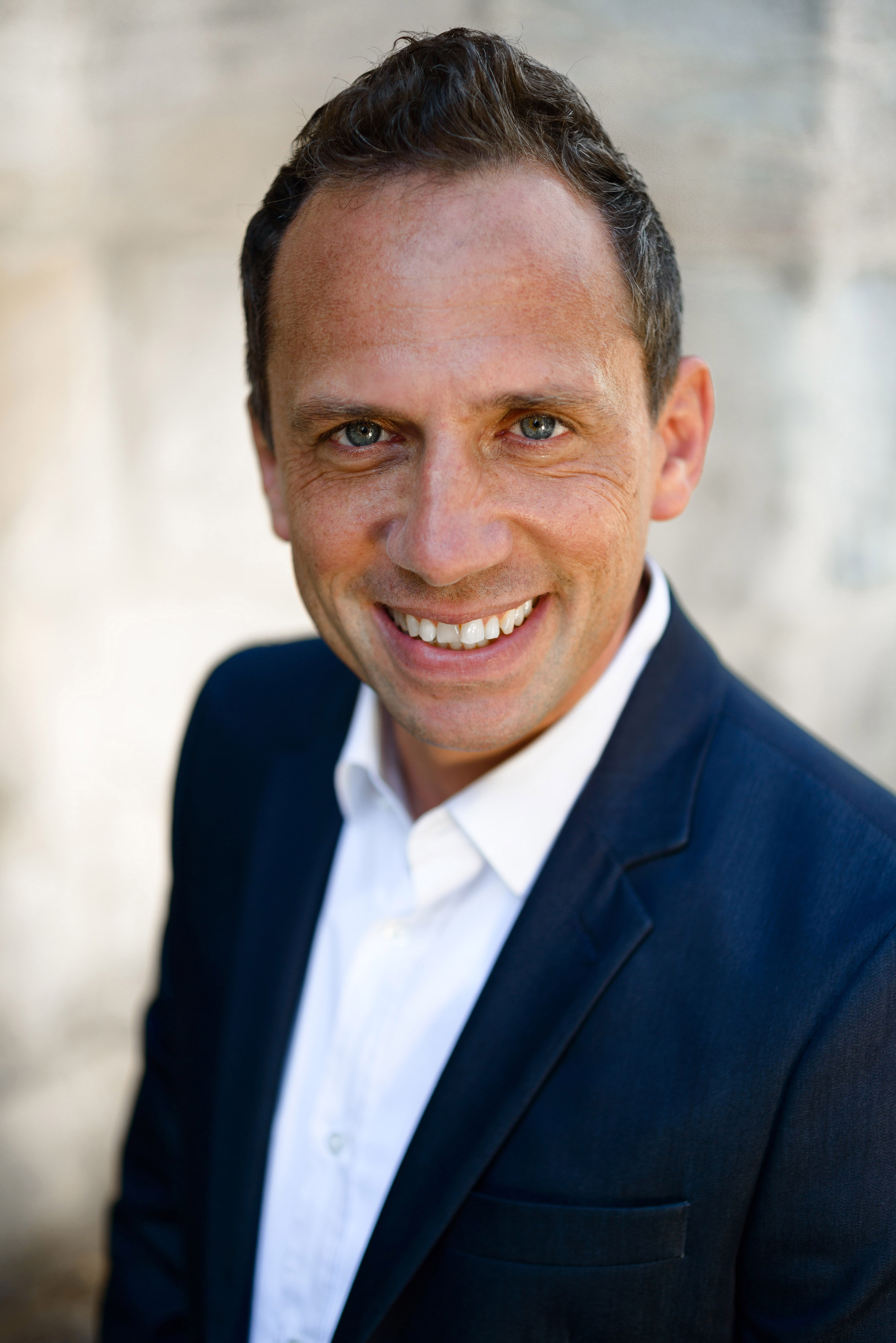
Thorsten Glauber

Thorsten Glauber (born 21 November 1970 in Forchheim) is a German Free Voter politician in the Bavarian Parliament (German: Landtag). Since 12 November 2018, Glauber has served as the current Bavarian State Minister for Environmental and Consumer Protection Affairs in the second Söder Cabinet.

== Private life ==
Thorsten Glauber is the son of the former county commissioner Reinhardt Glauber. He is currently unmarried and has a daughter. He is a Roman Catholic.

== Education ==
After his education as a communications electrician, Glauber sought to attend a trade school. From 1992 until 1994, he attended the Bamberg trade school. From 1994 until 1996, he studied to become an architectural draftsman at the Coburg University of Applied Sciences. He then went on to study Architecture from 1996 until 2000, at the Coburg University of Applied Sciences. From 2000 until 2002, Glauber worked as a staff Architect in Erlangen. He completed an MBE in Facility Management at the University of Georg-Simon-Ohm, Nürnberg from 2001 until 2003. In 2003, he began working as an independent Architect in Forchheim, establishing the Office of Glauber and Rosbigalle.

== Political career ==
In 1993 Glauber joined the Free Voters. Since 2008 he has belonged to the Council of the Registered District Association of the Free Voters and has been a vice-chair of the County Association of Free Votes in Upper Franconia since 2009. In his hometown of Pinzberg, he has held the office of mayor since 2008. He has been a councilman of the association of administrations of Gosberg since 2002. In the State Elections of 2008, he campaigned in the district of Forchheim, earning 23.4% of the vote, moving Glauber from the party list of Upper Franconia to the Bavarian Parliament for the first time. Glauber won 26.4% of the vote in the Bavarian State Elections of 2013, the best electoral result of any Free Voter candidate in Bavaria. He held the position of Deputy Group Chairman of the Free Voters in the 17th legislature. Since Mai 2014 Glauber has been a county councilmember in Forchheim. In the State Elections of 2014, he was reelected again with 25.2% of the vote, again the highest figure among the Free Voters in Bavaria. After the establishment of the Black-Orange Coalition Government between the CSU Party (Christian Socialist Union, led by Markus Söder, Bavarian Prime Minister) and the Free Voters, Glauber was appointed Bavarian State Minister for Climate and Consumer Protection Affairs in Söder’s second Cabinet.

Glauber is a member of the parliamentary Committee for Economic and Media Affairs, Infrastructure, Construction and Transportation, as well as the parliamentary Committee of State Budgetary and Financial Affairs. He is also a member of the Energy Advisory Board, as well as on the Broadcasting Council of the Bavarian Radio (German: Bayerische Rundfunk), Board of the Bavarian Foundation (German: Bayerischen Landesstiftung), in the Information and Communication Technology (ICT) Advisory Board and in the State Sports Council. He serves as the spokesperson on Construction, Energy, Transportation, Economics and Sport policy for the Free Voters Parliamentary Faction.
