= Michael Piazolo =

German politician (born 1959)

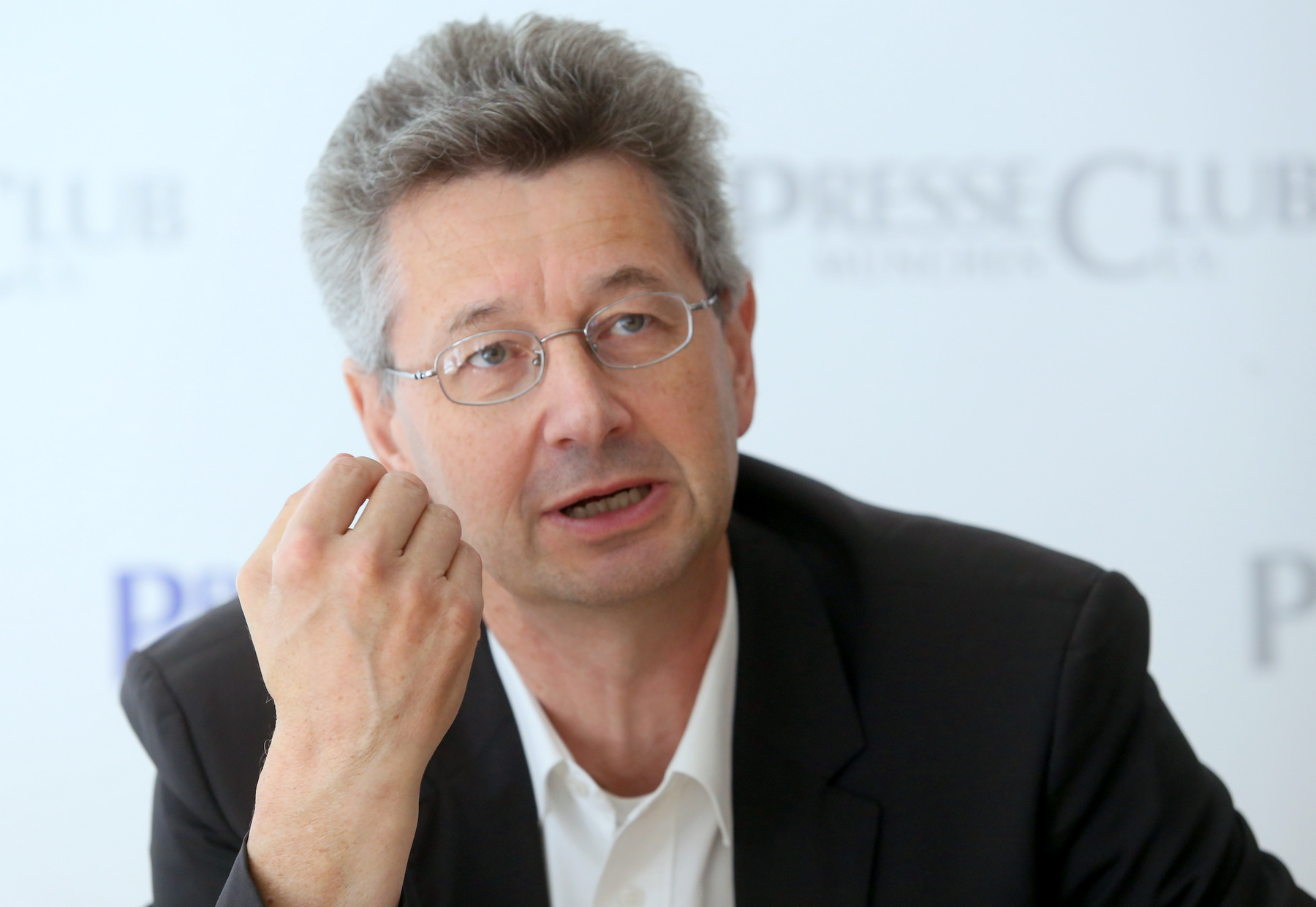
Piazolo 2017

Michael Piazolo (born 22 October 1959 in Stuttgart) is a German Free Voter politician, lawyer and political scientist. In 2018 he was appointed as the Bavarian State Minister for Culture and Education in Minister President Söder's second Cabinet.

== Life ==
Piazolo's father was a department chair in the Baden-Württemberg Ministry of Culture. Piazolo attended Karls-Gymnasium Stuttgart from 1969 until 1979, after which he studied law at LMU Munich. From 1981 until 1982 he studied Law and Political Science in the University of Lausanne, Switzerland. He resumed his studies at LMU from 1983 until 1985. From 1985 until 1988 he was a Law clerk at the district court Fürstenfeldbruck, at the University Speyer and the German Consulate General in New York.

In 1989 Piazolo worked as an advisor in the Department of Legal Affairs at the Munich Goethe-Institute. In 1990 he spent the summer semester at the University of Virginia. He was awarded a doctorate in Jurisprudence in 1992 by the University of Regensburg. From 1991 until 2006, Piazolo was an instructor in the Academy of Political Education in Tutzing, where he wrote many books and booklets on Constitutional, State, and European Law for the Academy as well as for the Bavarian State Center for Political Education. Since 1994 he has been a lecturer at the Munich School of Politics. In 1994/1995 he became managing director of the Independent Commission for the Review of Conflicts of Interest in Offices and Mandates. From 1996 until 2000, Piazolo was the Coordinator of an EU-Project called Eurofamilia. In 2003 he was employed at the University of Augsburg, where he worked as an associate professor until 2006. From 2006 to 2008 he was a professor at the University of Applied Sciences Berlin. Afterwards, from 2008 to 2013 he was a professor for European Studies at the Munich University of Applied Sciences.

Piazolo is Roman Catholic.

== Politics ==
Piazolo has been a member of the Free Voters since 2001. He became the Party's Munich City chairman in 2005 and in 2006 he became a vice chair of the party. In 2008 Piazolo was elected to the Munich City Council. In September that year he was elected to the Bavarian Parliament (German: Landtag), whereby he resigned from his office in the city council. He is also the Spokesperson for Higher Education of the Free Voters Parliamentary Faction, Speaker for Federal and European Affairs, as well as the Speaker for Cultural Politics. From 2013 until 2018 he was a member of the Committee for Higher Education, Research, and Culture. He was an initiator of the successful Referendum against Tuition Fees in Bavaria in 2013. Piazolo has served as the State Minister for Education and Culture since 2018 in Prime Minister Söder's Cabinet.

== Works ==
- Die Europäische Union. Elemente der Politik. VS Verlag für Sozialwissenschaften, Wiesbaden 2009.
- With Thomas Beck: Die gemeinsame Außen- und Sicherheitspolitik der EU. Verlag Fachhochschule für Verwaltung und Rechtspflege, Berlin 2007, ISBN 3-940056-01-4.
- Annäherung an die EU. Verlag Fachhochschule für Verwaltung und Rechtspflege, Berlin 2007, ISBN 3-933633-80-X.
- Macht und Mächte in einer multipolaren Welt. VS Verl. für Sozialwissenschaften, Wiesbaden 2006.
- Das integrierte Deutschland: europäische und internationale Verflechtungen. Bayerische Landeszentrale für politische Bildungsarbeit, München 2006.
- With Jürgen Weber: Föderalismus: Leitbild für die Europäische Union? Olzog, München 2004.
- Solidarität. Deutungen zu einem Leitprinzip der Europäischen Union. Ergon Verlag, 2004, ISBN 3-89913-337-4.
- Der Rechtsstaat. Bayer. Landeszentrale für politische Bildungsarbeit, München 1999, 2. Auflage 2002, 3. Auflage 2004.
- With Konrad Zumschlinge: 50 Jahre Europa-Union München. Geschichte einer Bürgerbewegung. Akademischer Verlag, München 2003.
- With Jürgen Weber: Justiz im Zwielicht. Ihre Rolle in Diktaturen und die Antwort des Rechtsstaates. Olzog, 2001, ISBN 3-7892-9201-X.
- With Jürgen Weber: Eine Diktatur vor Gericht. Aufarbeitung von SED-Unrecht durch die Justiz. Olzog-Aktuell, 2001 (3.–6. Tausend 1996, EA 1995) ISBN 3-7892-8390-8 (Rezension: Goltdammers Archiv für Strafrecht, Jg. 1997(144), Heft 4, Seite 181–183).
- With Heinke Lorenzen-Mersch, Jürgen Weber, Dorothea Weidinger, Gerhard Wolf: Zur Sache: Sozialkunde für Berufsschulen und Berufsfachschulen in Bayern (12. Jahrgangsstufe). Cornelsen, Stuttgart 1998/2001, ISBN 3-464-65576-8.
- Die Europäische Union – ein Überblick Akademischer. Verlag, München 1997.
- With Marie-Theres Tinnefeld and Klaus Köhler: Arbeit in der mobilen Kommunikationsgesellschaft, Vieweg+Teubner, 1996, ISBN 3-528-05545-6.
- Verfassungsgerichtsbarkeit und politische Fragen, die Political Question Doktrin im Verfahren vor dem Bundesverfassungsgericht und dem Supreme Court der USA. Reihe Junge Wissenschaft 5, Ernst Vögel Verlag, München 1994.
- Das Recht auf Abtreibung als Teilaspekt des Right of Privacy (Diss jur Regensburg). Peter Lang Verlag, Bern / Frankfurt am Main 1992, ISBN 3-631-45245-4.

=== As editor ===
- Modelle und Leitbilder für die Europäische Union. Verlag Fachhochschule für Verwaltung und Rechtspflege, Berlin 2008, ISBN 3-940056-08-1.
- Das Bundesverfassungsgericht – Ein Gericht im Schnittpunkt von Recht und Politik. v. Hase und Köhler, Mainz / München 1995.
- With Klaus Grosch: Festung oder offene Grenzen? Entwicklung des Einwanderungs- und Asylrechts in Deutschland und Europa (Akademie für Politische Bildung Tutzing). Akademischer Verlag, München 1995, ISBN 3-929115-58-1.
- Kulturelle Identität zwischen Tradition und Modernität: zur Bedeutung sozio-kultureller Faktoren in der entwicklungspolitischen Zusammenarbeit. Akademie für Politische Bildung, Tutzing 1992.
