= Fabian Mehring =

German politician (born 1989)

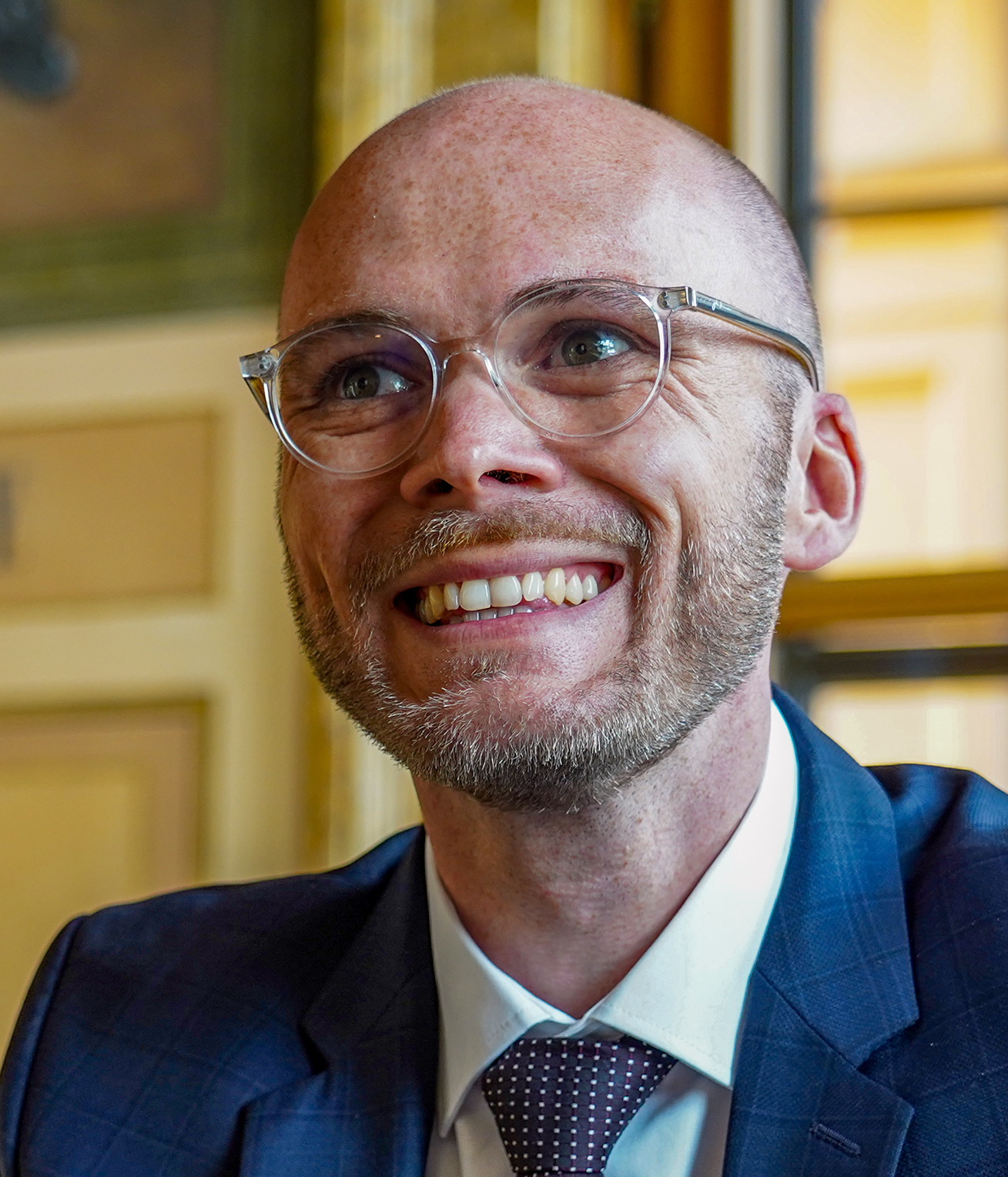
- Mehring in 2021

Minister of Digital Affairs of Bavaria
- Incumbent
- Assumed office 8 November 2023
- Minister-President: Markus Söder
- Preceded by: Judith Gerlach

Personal details
- Born: 14 February 1989 (age 37)
- Party: Free Voters

Fabian Mehring (born 14 February 1989) is a German politician serving as minister of digital affairs of Bavaria since 2023. He has been a member of the Landtag of Bavaria since 2018.
