= Felix Locke =

German politician (born 1988)

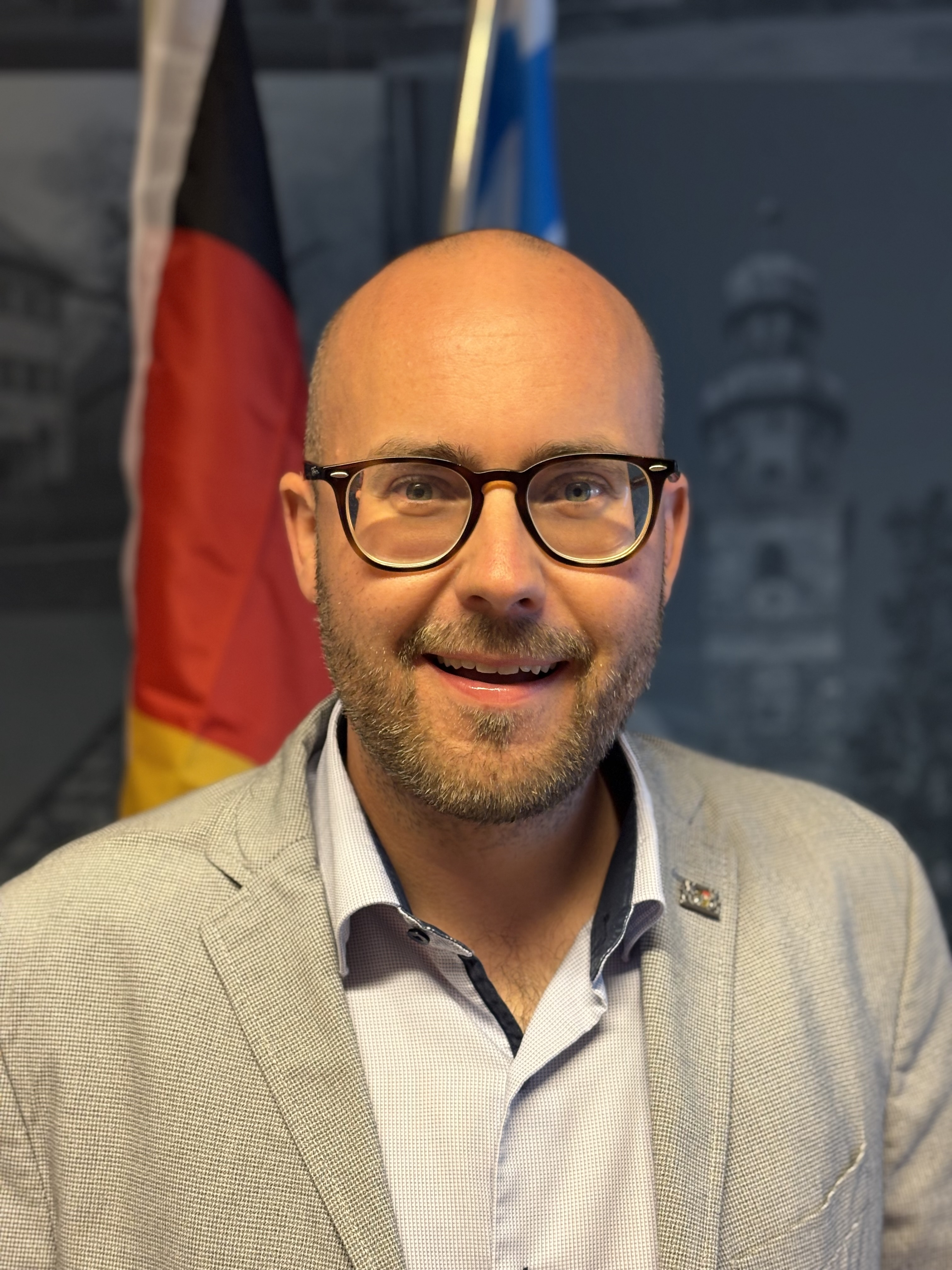
- Locke in 2025

Member of the Landtag of Bavaria
- Incumbent
- Assumed office 30 October 2023
- Constituency: Middle Franconia

Personal details
- Born: 14 January 1988 (age 38)
- Party: Free Voters of Bavaria (since 2013)

Felix Locke (born 14 January 1988) is a German politician serving as a member of the Landtag of Bavaria since 2023. He has served as chief whip of the Free Voters of Bavaria since 2023.
