= Otto Wiesheu =

German politician (b.1944)

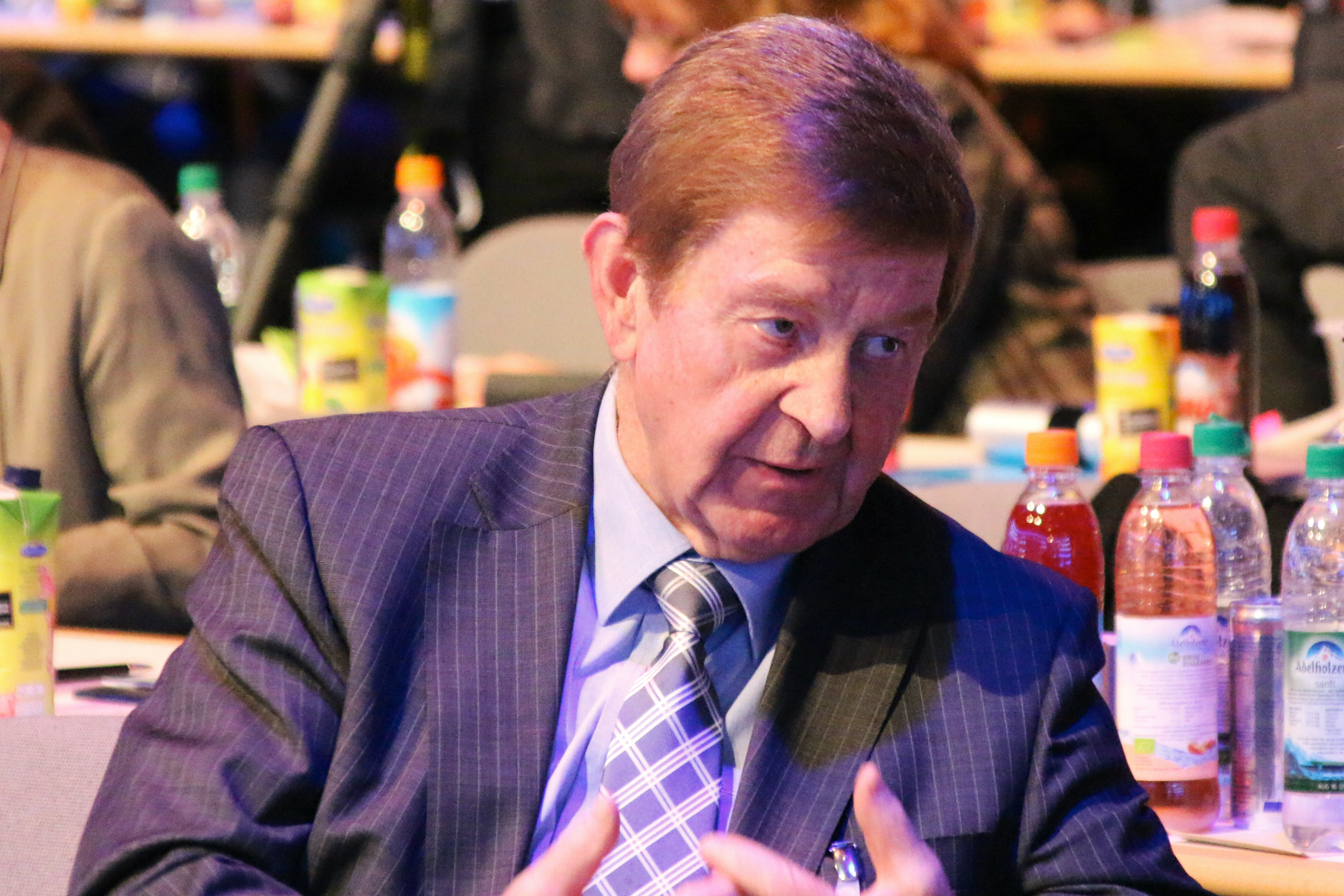
Otto Wiesheu

Dr. Otto Wiesheu (born October 31, 1944, in Zolling) is a German politician (CSU) from Bavaria and an expert on traffic.

He is a lawyer. From 1975 to 1979 he was chief of the youth organization Jungen Union Bayern. Since 1974 he has been a member of the Bavarian Parliament. Since July 17, 1993 he has been Bavarian minister for traffic and the economy.

On May 7, 2004, he was elected president of the Deutsch-Arabische Gesellschaft. He co-founded the German-Arab Friendship Association in 2007 and has been the association's president since then.

== Driving drunk ==
On October 29, 1983, he was driving his Mercedes 380 while drunk (1.75 per mille) and killed Polish citizen Josef Rubinfeld in his Fiat and severely injured another man. Otto Wiesheu was given 12 months' probation.
