= Bernd Sibler =

German politician (born 1971)

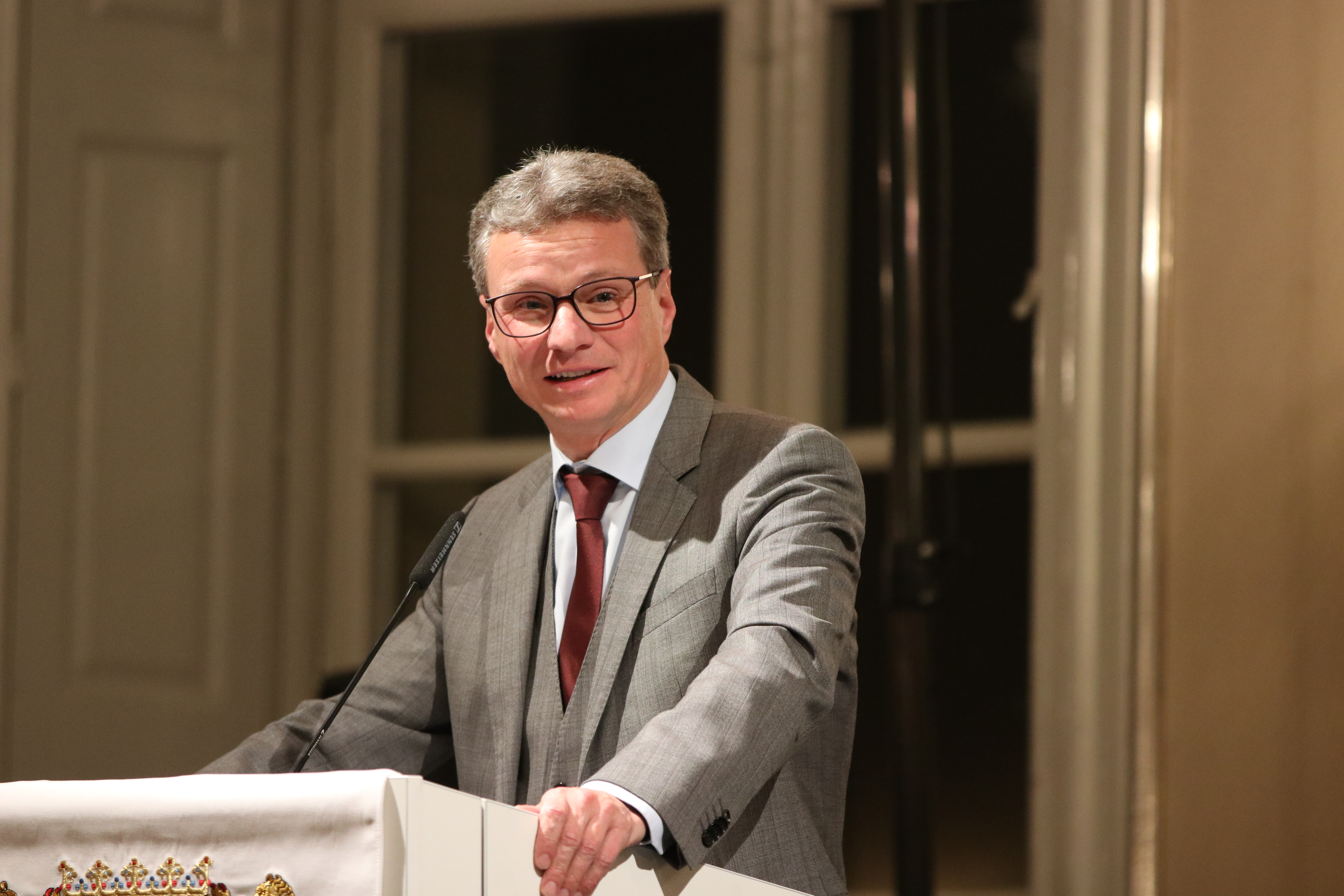
- Sibler in 2019

Landrat of Deggendorf
- Incumbent
- Assumed office 20 May 2022
- Preceded by: Christian Bernreiter

Personal details
- Born: 19 February 1971 (age 55) Straubing
- Party: Christian Social Union (since 1989)

Bernd Sibler (born 19 February 1971 in Straubing) is a German politician serving as Landrat of Deggendorf since 2022. From 2018 to 2022, he served as minister of science and art of Bavaria. In 2018, he served as minister of education and culture of Bavaria. From 1998 to 2022, he was a member of the Landtag of Bavaria.
