= Hans Reichhart =

German politician (born 1982)

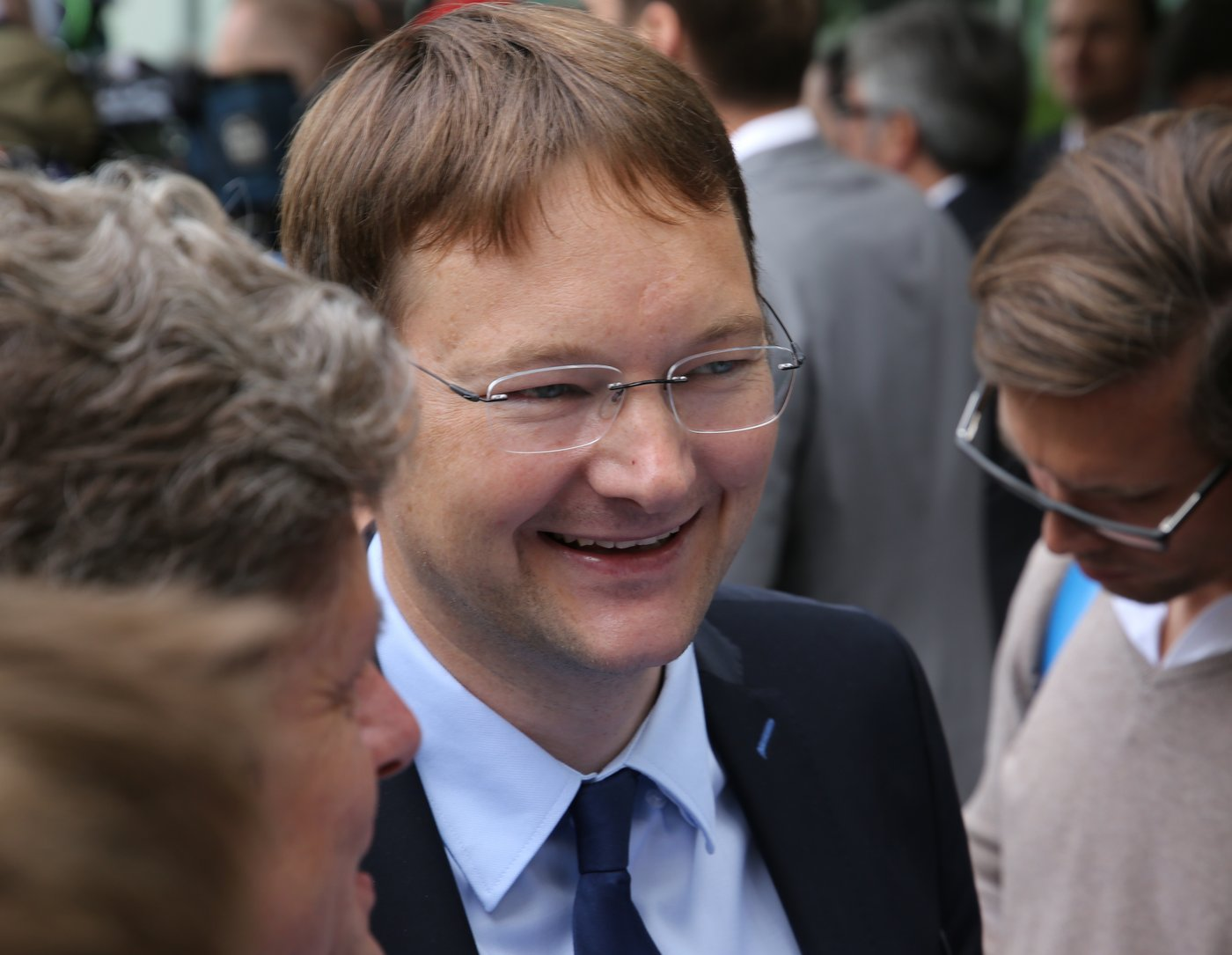
- Reichhart in 2018

Minister of Housing, Construction and Transport of Bavaria
- In office 12 November 2018 – 1 February 2020
- Minister-President: Markus Söder
- Preceded by: Ilse Aigner
- Succeeded by: Christian Bernreiter

Personal details
- Born: 20 June 1982 (age 43) Burgau
- Party: Christian Social Union

Hans Georg Reichhart (born 20 June 1982 in Burgau) is a German politician serving as Landrat of Günzburg since 2020. From 2018 to 2020, he served as minister of construction and transport of Bavaria. From 2013 to 2018, he was a member of the Landtag of Bavaria. From 2013 to 2019, he served as chairman of the Young Union in Bavaria.
