= Sandro Kirchner =

German politician (born 1975)

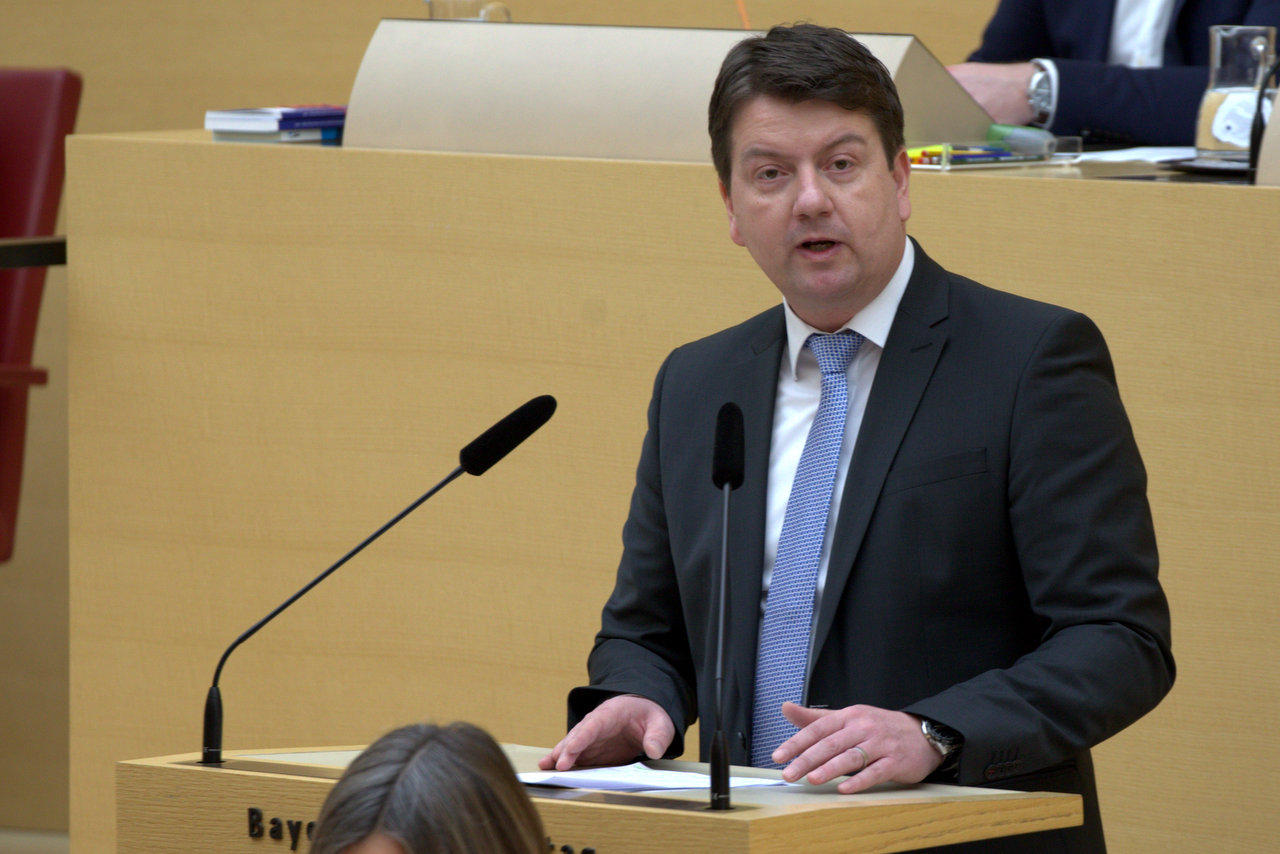
- Kirchner in 2019

Member of the Landtag of Bavaria
- Incumbent
- Assumed office 7 October 2013
- Preceded by: Robert Kiesel
- Constituency: Bad Kissingen

Personal details
- Born: 31 July 1975 (age 50) Bad Kissingen
- Party: Christian Social Union (since 1993)

Sandro Kirchner (born 31 July 1975 in Bad Kissingen) is a German politician serving as a member of the Landtag of Bavaria since 2013. He has served as state secretary of the interior, sport and integration of Bavaria since 2022.
