= Judith Gerlach =

German politician (born 1985)

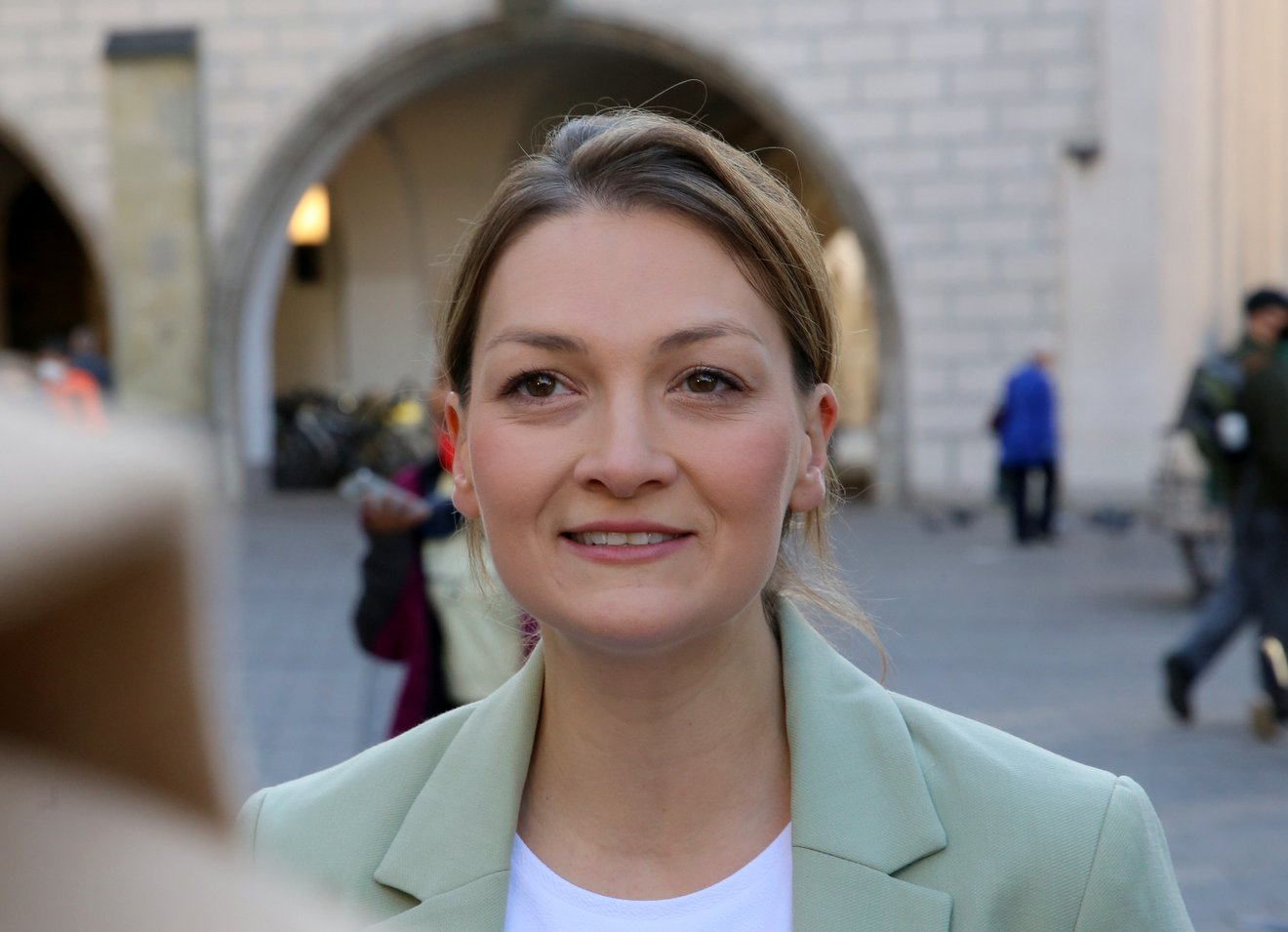
- Gerlach in 2021

Minister of Health, Care and Prevention of Bavaria
- Incumbent
- Assumed office 8 November 2023
- Minister-President: Markus Söder
- Preceded by: Klaus Holetschek

Personal details
- Born: 3 November 1985 (age 40) Würzburg
- Party: Christian Social Union
- Relatives: Paul Gerlach (grandfather)

Judith Gerlach (born 3 November 1985 in Würzburg) is a German politician serving as Minister of Health, Care and Prevention of Bavaria since 2023. From 2018 to 2023, she served as Minister of Digital Affairs of Bavaria. She has been a member of the Landtag of Bavaria since 2013.
