= Ulrike Scharf =

German politician (born 1967)

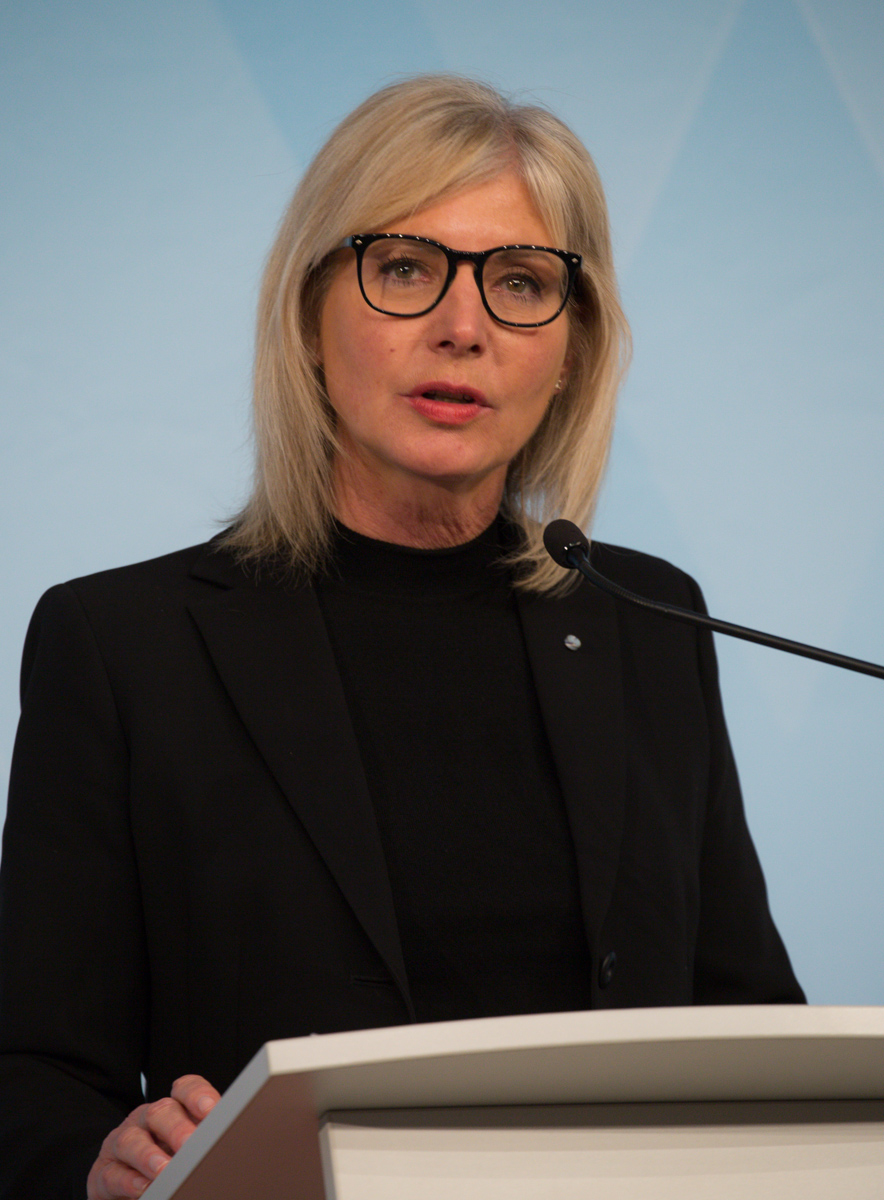
- Scharf in 2024

Minister of Family, Labour and Social Affairs of Bavaria
- Incumbent
- Assumed office 23 February 2022
- Minister-President: Markus Söder
- Preceded by: Carolina Trautner

Personal details
- Born: 16 December 1967 (age 58) Erding
- Party: Christian Social Union (since 1995)

Ulrike Scharf (born 16 December 1967 in Erding) is a German politician. She has served as minister of family, labour and social affairs of Bavaria since 2022, and as deputy minister-president since 2023. From 2014 to 2018, she served as minister of environment and consumer protection. She has been a member of the Landtag of Bavaria since 2013, having previously served from 2006 to 2008.
