= Georg Eisenreich =

German politician (born 1970)

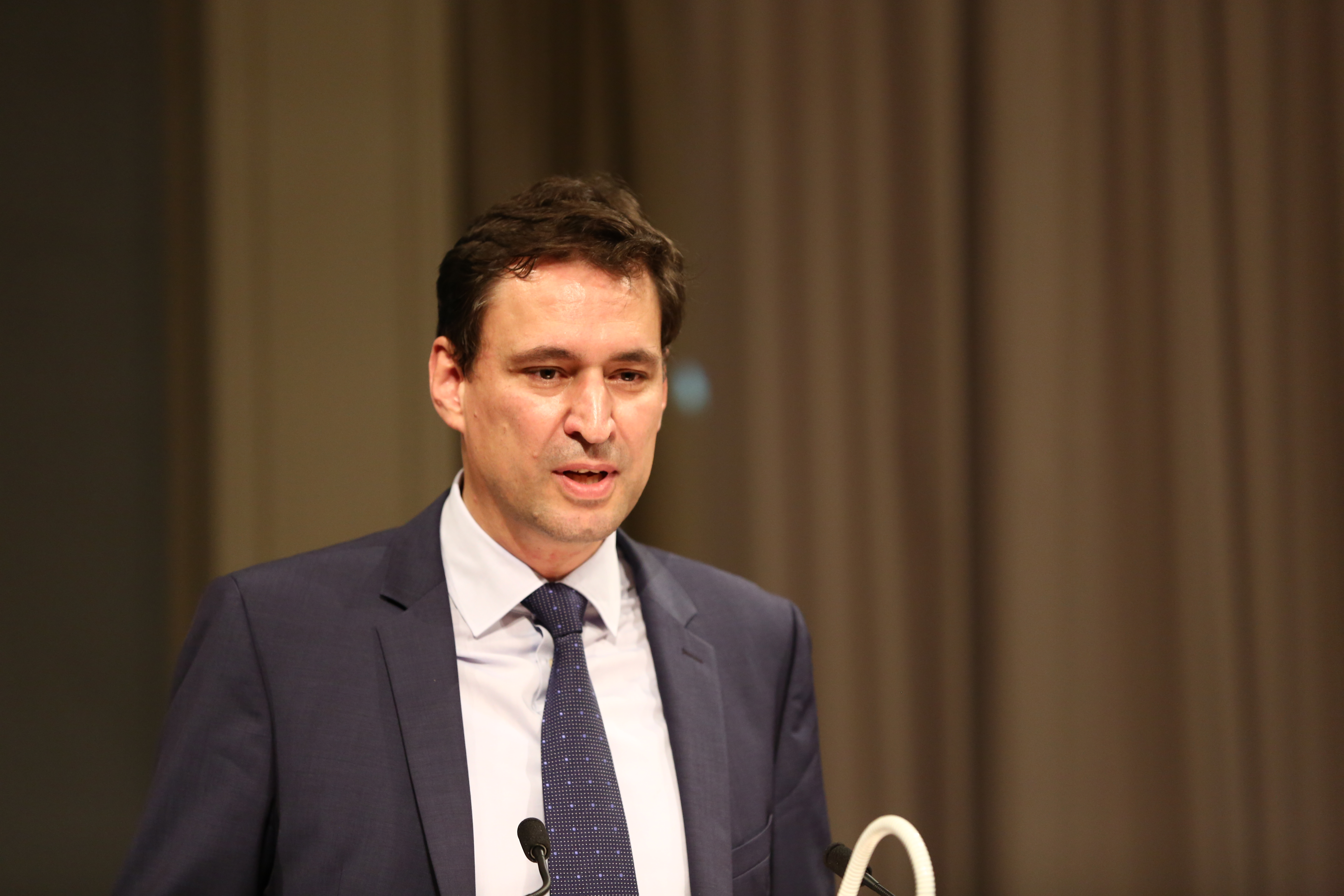
Georg Eisenreich, 2017

Georg Eisenreich (born 6 December 1970 in Munich) is a German politician of the Christian Social Union of Bavaria (CSU). He is a member of the Landtag of Bavaria.

== Political career ==
Eisenreich has been a member of the Landtag of Bavaria since 2003. Between 2010 and 2013, he chaired a cross-party working group on the implementation of the Convention on the Rights of Persons with Disabilities in Bavaria.

Following the 2013 state elections, Eisenreich was appointed State Secretary at the State Ministry of Education, Research and the Arts in the government of Minister-President Horst Seehofer. In the government of Minister-President Markus Söder, he has been serving as State Minister for European Affairs, Digitization and Media (2018) and State Minister of Justice (since 2018).

Eisenreich is one of his state's representatives at the Bundesrat, where he serves on the Committee on European Affairs. In addition, he is also a member of the German-French Friendship Group set up by the German Bundesrat and the French Senate as well as of the German-Russian Friendship Group set up in cooperation with the Russian Federation Council.

Eisenreich was a CSU delegate to the Federal Convention for the purpose of electing the President of Germany in 2012 and 2022.

== See also ==
- List of Bavarian Christian Social Union politicians
