= Klaus Holetschek =

German politician (born 1964)

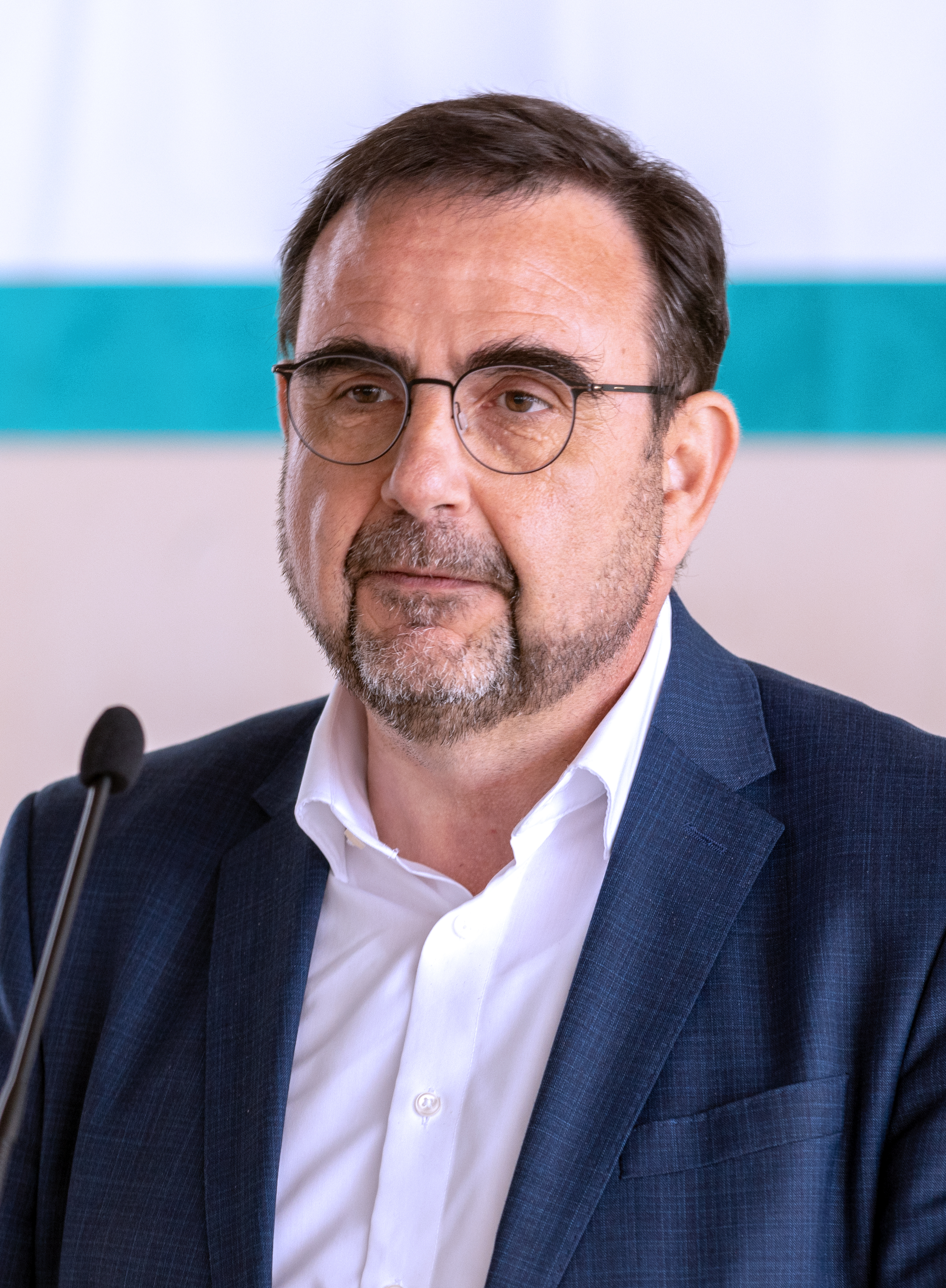
- Holetschek in 2023

Member of the Landtag of Bavaria
- Incumbent
- Assumed office 7 October 2013
- Preceded by: Josef Miller
- Constituency: Memmingen

Personal details
- Born: 21 October 1964 (age 61) Landshut
- Party: Christian Social Union (since 1981)

Klaus Holetschek (born 21 October 1964 in Landshut) is a German politician serving as a member of the Landtag of Bavaria since 2013. He has served as group leader of the Christian Social Union since 2023. From 2021 to 2023, he served as minister of health and care of Bavaria. From 2002 to 2013, he served as mayor of Bad Wörishofen. From 1998 to 2002, he was a member of the Bundestag.

== Personal life ==
Holetschek is married with two children.
