= Michaela Kaniber =

German politician (born 1977)

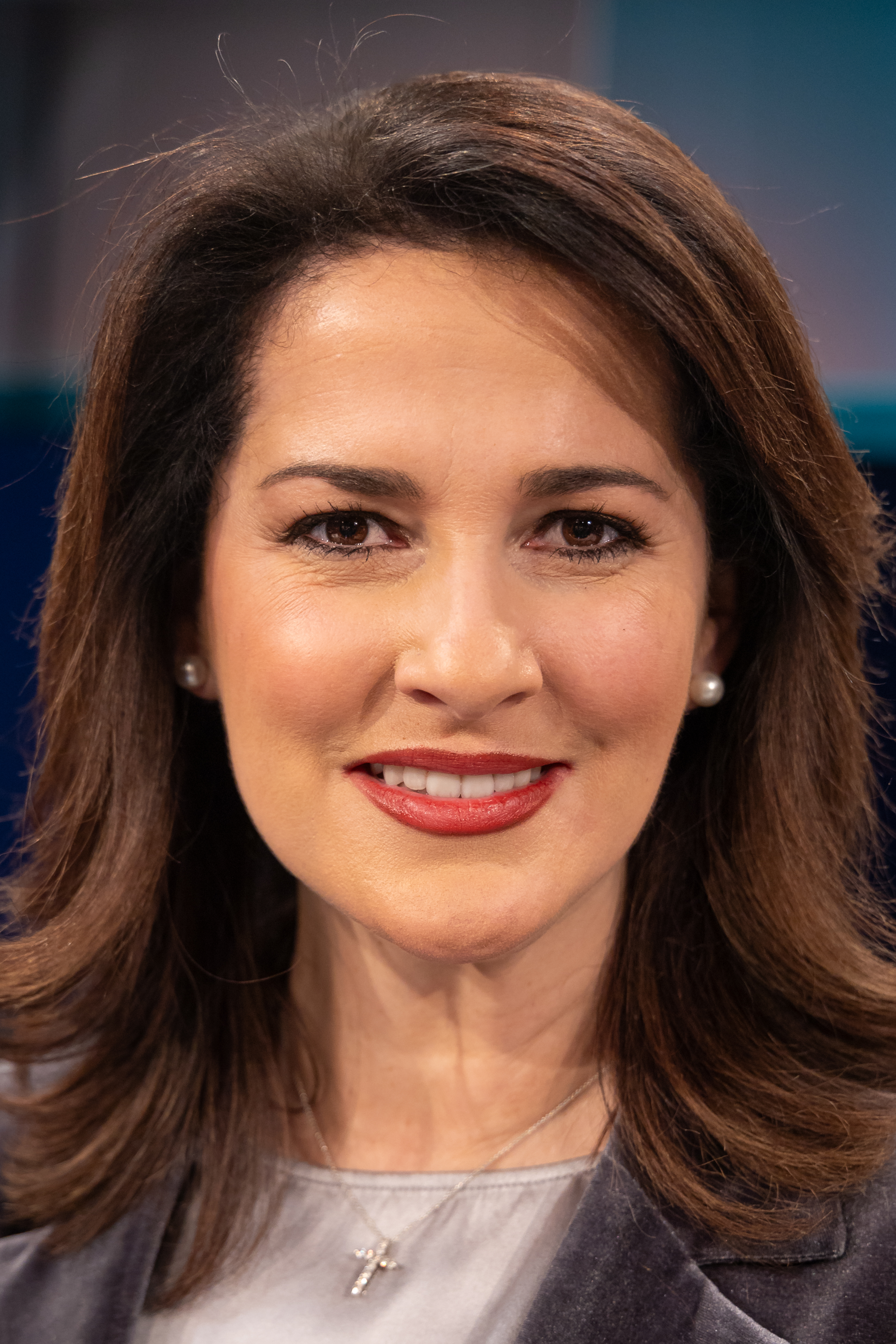
- Kaniber in 2024

Minister of Tourism of Bavaria
- Incumbent
- Assumed office 8 November 2023
- President: Markus Söder
- Preceded by: Office established

Minister for Food, Agriculture and Forestry of Bavaria
- Incumbent
- Assumed office 21 March 2018
- President: Markus Söder
- Preceded by: Helmut Brunner

Member of the Landtag of Bavaria
- In office 15 September 2013 – 21 March 2018

Personal details
- Born: Michaela Brekalo; 14 September 1977 (age 48) Bad Reichenhall, Bavaria, West Germany
- Citizenship: Germany; Croatia
- Party: CSU (since 2005)
- Spouse: Thomas Kaniber (m. 1997)
- Children: 3
- Occupation: Tax advisor; politician

Michaela Kaniber (née Brekalo; born 14 September 1977) is a German politician of the CSU party. She has been a member of the Bavarian State Parliament since 2013, and the Bavarian Minister for Food, Agriculture, and Forestry since 2018. Tourism was also added to her ministry in November 2023 as part of the Third Söder cabinet.

Kaniber has a reputation as a "farmer whisperer." During the farmers' protests in late 2023 and early 2024, she was considered a mediator between agriculture and politics. She emphasised the importance of sustainability and regional value creation in agricultural policy.

== Early life ==
Michaela Brekalo was born in Bad Reichenhall. Her parents, ethnic Croats, came to West Germany as Gastarbeiter from Herzegovina (at the time, part of Yugoslavia) to Bad Reichenhall. Her father is from the village of Gornja Prisika (now in Bosnia and Herzegovina), and her mother from Aržano (now Croatia). She completed vocational training in tax and business consulting and worked at a local tax office from 1996 to 2004, and in her family's catering business from 2005 to 2013. Brekalo met her future husband, Thomas Kaniber, at age 17. They married when she was 20, and have three children. She lives in Bayerisch Gmain.
