= Christian Bernreiter =

German politician

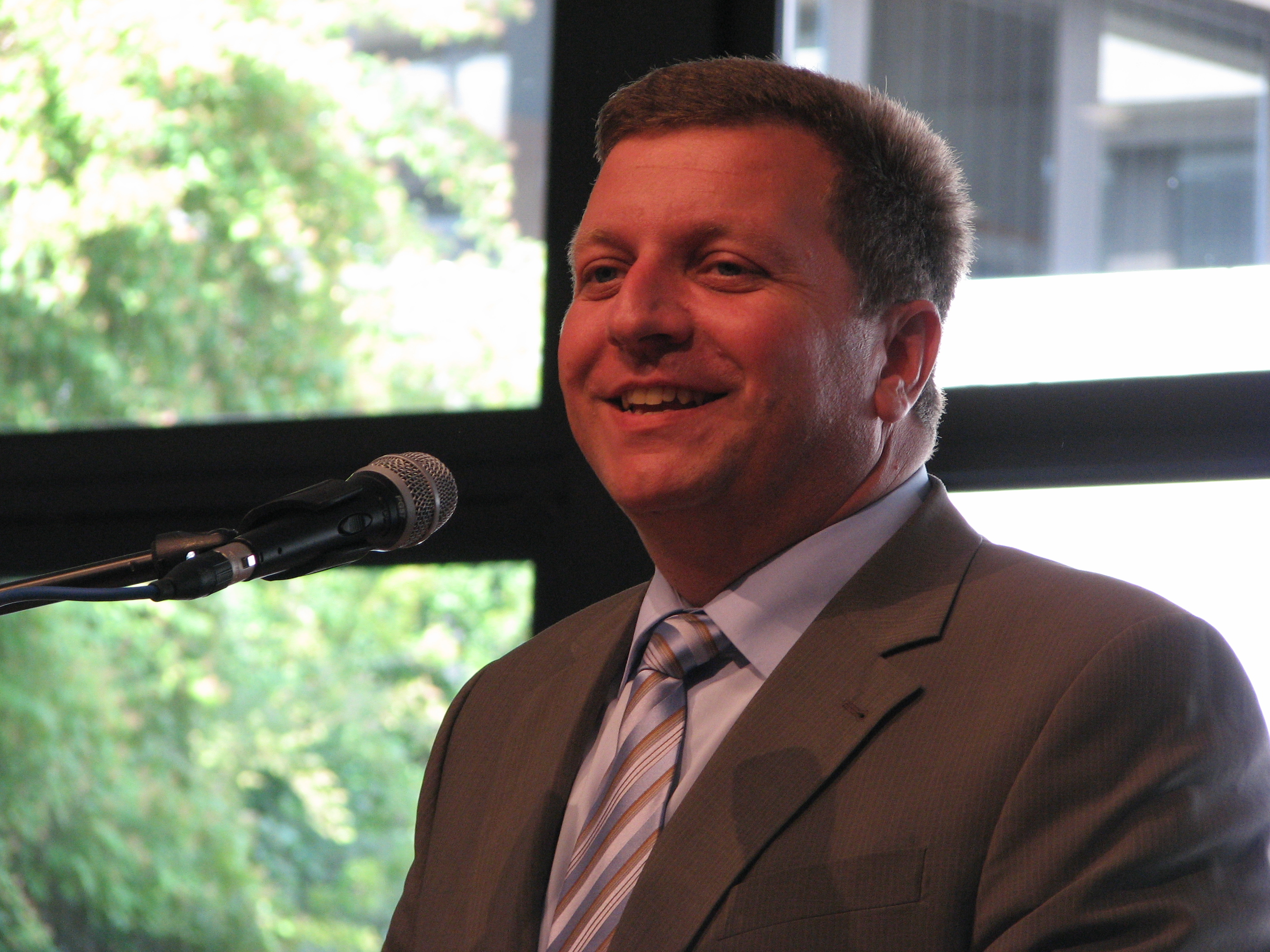

Christian Bernreiter (born 7 April 1964 in Straubing) is a German engineer and politician of the Christian Social Union (CSU) who has been serving as State Minister for Housing, Construction and Transport in the cabinet of Minister President Markus Söder since 2022.

== Political career ==
In the negotiations to form a Grand Coalition under the leadership of Friedrich Merz's Christian Democrats (CDU together with the Bavarian CSU) and the Social Democratic Party (SPD) following the 2025 German elections, Bernreiter was part of the CDU/CSU delegation in the working group on transport, infrastructure and housing, led by Ina Scharrenbach, Ulrich Lange, Klara Geywitz and Sören Bartol.

== Other activities ==
- Federal Network Agency for Electricity, Gas, Telecommunications, Posts and Railway (BNetzA), Alternate Member of the Rail Infrastructure Advisory Council (since 2021)

== See also ==
- List of Bavarian Christian Social Union politicians
