= Free Voters of Bavaria =

Political party in Germany

Free Voters of Bavaria Freie Wähler Bayern
- Abbreviation: FW
- Chairperson: Vacant
- Founded: 6 May 1978; 48 years ago (as Landesverband); 7 June 1997; 29 years ago (as party)
- Headquarters: Munich, Germany
- Youth wing: Young Free Voters
- Ideology: Bavarian regionalism; Conservatism (German); Classical liberalism
- Political position: Centre-right
- National affiliation: Free Voters
- Slogan: Bayerns starke Mitte. ('Bavaria's strong centre.')
- Bundestag (Bavarian seats): 0 / 108
- Landtag of Bavaria: 37 / 203
- Bezirktags (Bavaria): 32 / 238
- Bavarian State Government (Cabinet Söder II): 5 / 18

Website
- www.fw-bayern.de

The Free Voters of Bavaria (German: Freie Wähler Bayern) is a conservative (Note: Attributed to multiple sources:) political party in Bavaria. It has served as part of the governing coalition there since the 2018 state election under the leading Christian Social Union. The term "Free Voters" is also applied to the various independent voter groups common in Bavarian municipal and district elections. The name Free Voters of Bavaria applies to both the Bavarian State Association of Free and Independent Voters (seat: Munich), an umbrella organization of Free Voter groups, as well as the Bavarian state chapter of the nationwide party Free Voters (German: Freie Wähler). The two groups exist simultaneously under the same name due to Bavarian election law not allowing umbrella organizations to run for office, thus the state party Free Voters of Bavaria was founded in 1997 in order to participate in the Bavarian state elections.

Due to the party's origins as an organization of independent politicians seeking alternatives to the established parties, the Free Voters are loosely organized and have no standardized ideology among its members. They stand as a centre-right party and often focus on local issues and local politics, as a consequence of their advocacy for more direct-democratic measures. The Free Voters of Bavaria were led by Hubert Aiwanger, who served as party leader from 2018 until his death in 2026, and who also served as a Deputy Minister-President of Bavaria.

== Relationship of umbrella organization and party ==
The executive committee of the umbrella organization (state association, German: Landesverband) and that of the party (state chapter, German: Landesvereinigung) is identical. However, this should not obscure the fact that these are two entirely independent organizations in terms of structure.

The state association comprises voter groups as members and, due to data protection laws, may not even know the names of individual members within those local groups. In contrast, the party's members are natural persons, and joining a local voter group is not a prerequisite for party membership. Moreover, only a small portion of individuals from the voter groups choose to join the party.

Executive committee of the Freie Wähler Landesverband and the Freie Wähler Landesvereinigung
State Chairman	Vacant	
Deputy State Chairman	Armin Kroder	
Deputy State Chairman	Ulrike Müller	
Deputy State Chairman	Michael Piazolo	
Deputy State Chairman	Simson Hipp	
General Secretary	Michael Piazolo	
Young Free Voters Chairman	Felix Locke	
Treasurer	Edgar Klüpfel	
Legal Clerk	Georg Meiski	
Assessors	Schwaben	Leopold Herz
Assessors	Oberfranken	Peter Dorscht
Assessors	Unterfranken	Hans Jürgen Fahn
Assessors	Oberbayern	Christine Degenhart
Assessors	Mittelfranken	Peter Bauer
Assessors	Oberpfalz	Manuela Koller
Assessors	Niederbayern	Heinrich Schmidt
Assessors	München	Felix Stahl

To avoid a competitive relationship between the voter groups and the party, the party does not participate in municipal and district elections, even though its statute permits it. In Bavaria, the party's lowest organizational level is the district chapter, as local chapters currently do not exist. The Bavarian state chapter (Landesvereinigung Bayern) does not use the blue-yellow logo of the federal party, but instead uses the green-orange logo of the state association. Even in public communications, the Free Voters of Bavaria generally do not distinguish between the state association and the state chapter.

== Umbrella organization ==
Since the 1950s, independent voter groups were formed by citizens of Bavaria at the municipal and district levels. These groups took part in local elections as an alternative to the established parties with their own, independent candidates. Numerous such municipal and district groups founded the umbrella organization of the Bavarian State Association of Free and Independent Voters (self designated FREIE WÄHLER, also abbreviated FW) in 1978, in order to agree on common goals and strategies. Currently, around 870 municipal and district voter groups are organized in the umbrella organization. The state association is a member of the Federal Association of Free Voters Germany. It has no election program and therefore does not run in elections.

=== Organization of the umbrella organization ===
The FW Landesverband Bayern is divided into bezirk (regional) associations. Even if the statute and association distinguish district and local associations, these do not exist as a subdivision of the state association but are completely independent voter groups. Not all local voter groups organized in the association necessarily have to be members of a voter group at the district level. Legally, these are two independent memberships. In a community, more than one voter group can be a member of the state association.

Voter groups organized in the association do not have to carry Free Voters or the abbreviation FW in their club names. This can cause misunderstandings as other voter groups, who are not members of the state association, can also call themselves Free Voters.

Bezirksverband	Vorsitzender
Mittelfranken	Walter Schnell
Niederbayern	Heinrich Schmidt
Oberbayern	Eva Gottstein
Oberfranken	Klaus Förster
Oberpfalz	Tanja Schweiger
Schwaben	Bernhard Pohl, MdL
Unterfranken	Günther Felbinger

=== Participation in local elections ===
Voter groups are traditionally strongly represented at the municipal and district levels in Bavaria. In the municipal elections of 2008, they achieved 19% of the vote across Bavaria, making them the third largest group behind the Christian Social Union in Bavaria (CSU) and the Social Democratic Party of Germany (SPD). However, only a fraction of these voter groups are organized in the State Association of Free Voters. Currently, 10 (out of 71) district chief executives come from within the ranks of the voter groups organized in the association.

It is possible that several voter groups organized in the association could compete against each other in the same election. This is possible because the voter groups act autonomously and there is no election program from the state association. Although the Bezirk (regions) in Bavaria count as the municipal level, no voter groups compete in elections on this level.

== Party ==
In the mid-1990s, the goal was to run for the Bavarian state parliament as part of the umbrella organization of the Free Voters. Since election proposals under the Bavarian State Electoral Law can only be submitted by political parties and voters' associations, not by an umbrella organization, in 1997, members of the local voter groups founded the association FW Freie Wähler Bayern e. V. with the aim of participating in the bezirk (regional) and state elections in Bavaria. It went on, as Landesvereinigung Bayern, to become the party Free Voters (Bundesvereinigung) in 2011. The purpose of the Landesvereinigung FREIE WÄHLER Bayern is, according to its statute, "participation at the political levels of the municipalities, bezirk (regional), state, federal government and Europe" (Article 1 (5)).

=== Organization of the state chapter (party) ===
According to its statute, the organs of the state chapter are the executive committee, the extended executive committee, and the delegate assembly. The executive committee of the state chapter consists of the state chairman, four equal deputies, the chairman of the "JUNGE FREIE WÄHLER Bayern", the treasurer, the legal clerk, and eight assessors. The same people work for the State association as well. The party is subdivided into state, bezirk (regional), and district chapters.

District Association	Chairman
München	Michael Piazolo
Mittelfranken	Walter Schnell
Niederbayern	Heinrich Schmidt
Oberbayern	Eva Gottstein
Oberfranken	Klaus Förster
Oberpfalz	Tanja Schweiger
Schwaben	Markus Brem
Unterfranken	Hans Jürgen Fahn

=== Participation in regional and state elections ===
The decision to take part in state elections was made in 1997 at a state delegates' meeting by a narrow majority and subsequently legitimized by a membership poll. Nevertheless, the decision to take part in parliamentary elections was, and is still, controversial within the voter groups. The advocates pointed out, as in other states, that the rules for the municipalities are made in the state. However, some voter groups withdrew from the umbrella organization or announced that they would not support its candidacy due to this decision. Critics said that the Free Voters would leave their actual communal field of activity. According to the party law, the Free Voters would receive the characterization of a party by participating in the state election. Even if the new organization decided to call itself a voter group, an "alternative to the parties" and (according to the first statute of 7 June 1997)only included non-partisan citizens as members, it still approached the status of a party in terms of membership, organization, statutes and political objectives. In 2011, this step was formally completed: on 15 December 2011, FREIE WÄHLER Bayern e. V. integrated itself as "Landesvereinigung Bayern" into a newly founded, nationwide acting party "FREIE WÄHLER." Its founding had become necessary in order to participate in federal elections. This decision was also especially controversial within its own ranks and in scientific discussions. Voices within those discussions saw negative repercussions in the party's successes within local politics and on the self-image of the Free Voters as an ideology-free alternative to the established parties.

The FW entered the Bavarian state election in 1998 for the first time and got 3.7% of the vote. In the 2003 election, its voter share slightly increased to 4.0%. Despite this gain the FW's missed entry into the state parliament due to the five percent threshold. In the 2008 state election, the Free Voters finally received 10.2% of the vote and 21 representatives in the state legislature, forming the parliament's third strongest force after the CDU and SDP. In the 2013 state election, the Free Voters defended its third place with 9.0% of the vote and 19 representatives from the party Alliance 90/The Greens Bavaria, which received 18 seats. Since 1998, the FW voter group has participated in bezirk (regional) parliament elections, which take place simultaneously with the state elections. Since there is no five percent threshold on this level, the Free Voters entered several bezirk (regional) parliaments. In the 1998 elections they won a total of 9 seats and in 2003 10 seats. In the 2008 and 2013 elections the Free Voters won 24 and 21 seats respectively.

Results for the Free Voters in the 2018 Bavarian state election

The Free Voters of Bavaria formed a new government with the CSU after 2018 Bavarian state election on 14 October 2018.

== Policy positions ==
In their substantive positions, the Free Voters are on the political centre-right. They are not especially close to any of the established parties, but represent, depending on the topic, positions considered classical-liberal (strengthening of civil and human rights, SME promotion, public budget discipline), conservative (increasing the number of security staff, stricter border controls, more deportations of rejected asylum seekers and less family reunification for refugees in Germany, drug control, promoting local traditions and dialects), social-liberal (state general interest, equal opportunities in education, housing promotion), and green (energy policy, water management). This has often lead the Free Voters to be accused of arbitrariness or populism; they justify their lack of a clear position in the party landscape by the need to operate a pragmatic policy beyond ideological determinations. They therefore emphasize their interest in cross-party cooperation and demand transparent voting behavior from their representatives in the Landtag of Bavaria, according to their own statements (parliamentary discipline). At their core the Free Voters are fundamentally a coalition of independents, organized together for elections, which accounts for their ideological diversity.

Priority areas in Bavarian state policy since 2008 are the education and university policy (abolition of tuition fees and the extension of high school to nine years (abolition of the G8, or eight-year high school)), the promotion of renewable energies, the opposition of major projects (third runway of Munich Airport, deepening of the Danube river for navigation, second main line of the S-Bahn Munich). Profile-forming positions of the Free Voters have developed in the fields of municipal, education and energy policy. The positions can be viewed, for example, in thematic papers of the state parliament group or in the guidelines of the party for the state election of 2013.

=== EU policy ===
Ulrike Müller is the Free Voters’ first and currently only Member of Parliament in the EU Parliament, and is currently part of the EDP (European Democratic Party), as well as part of the ALDE (Alliance of Liberals and Democrats for Europe Party). She was elected in 2014 as the Party forerunner in the EU election. The Free Voters' goal in the 2019 European Parliament election was to add at least one more MP seat to their party, as during the last EU election in 2014 they only lacked 2300 votes from securing a second seat. The Free Voters have endorsed Manfred Weber from the CSU for the President of the European Commission.

With the election motto "For a Europe of strong regions" (German: Für ein Europa der starken Regionen), the Free Voters sought to strengthen regional authority in the EU and have called for greater democratization of the EU processes, specifically advocating for a more direct form of democracy and deregulation. "In the last five years we have proven that less regulation means substantially more for the citizens. We have only concentrated on the large things and have actually left the smaller tasks to the regions. That is the right way of the Free Voters", says Ulrike Müller. However at the same time the Free Voters also sought to create a central and united EU policy on several key issues such energy policy, the European migrant crisis and security policy.

=== Funding and political donations ===
Like all German parties that reach the required threshold (1% of votes cast in the case of parliamentary elections), the Free Voters receive a certain allocated amount of funding from the state that subsidizes their finances and costs. The amount received is dependent upon the total number of votes a party earned in the past election, which amounts to €0.85 for the first four million votes and €0.70 for all subsequent votes thereafter. These funds are used to supplement the money that parties receive from their members’ contributions and subscription fees, as well as any political donations they may receive from private individuals, organizations, or firms. The Free Voters, unlike other parties in the Bavarian Parliament (German: Landtag) and in the German Federal Parliament (German: Bundestag), do not accept donations from corporations or businesses, as this conflicts with their grassroots origins and direct democracy ideals. Hubert Aiwanger, party leader of the Free Voters, has gone on record saying, "Party donations should be prohibited, state party financing is sufficient."

=== Education policy ===
The Free Voters advocate a transfer of sovereignty of educational qualification certification and school educational standards from the state level to the federal level in order to standardize educational practices and criteria across Germany. They wish for the Ministry of Education and Research to be supplemented by a school department. This new group would oversee the various responsibilities that creating and managing an interstate standardization of educational qualifications and standards would entail. The Secretary General of the Free Voters, Steffen Große, stated:

“We do not want to deprive the federal states of their responsibility towards schools. In the interests of all parents and students, we want a reliable and fair framework from the North Sea to the Bavarian Alps and from the Saar to Frankfurt / Oder. Different standards and ratings are highly unfair for the children and parents. The Education Ministers of the federal states have failed in the past decades to make joint agreements that ensure sufficient comparability”.

The Free Voters advocated for a return to a version of the traditional G9 system for Gymnasium (a type of German secondary school). Prior to the early 2000s this form of Gymnasium was predominant and stipulated that a pupil should attend secondary education for 9 years (13 years of education total). However, after the mid-2000s, strong political pressure mounted to reduce the time spent in Gymnasium. Currently, most students nationwide only attend Gymnasium for 8 years (referred to as G8, for a total of 12 years of schooling). Under the Free Voter's proposed policy, the G9 would be restored throughout Bavaria. The argued advantages of such a system are that it would allow pupils an extra year to prepare for the state standardized leaving examination (German: Abitur) and ease the burdens students face during their studies. It would also allow them to pursue useful and healthy activities such as sports, music and other hobbies. The Free Voters were able to call a referendum on 16 July 2014, that was ultimately successful in restoring the G9 system across Bavaria.

In 2019, the first cohort of students using the G9 system began their secondary education and are expected to graduate in 2028.

In January 2013, the Free Voters campaigned to abolish college tuition in Bavaria. Under the name "No to college tuition in Bavaria" (German: Nein zu Studiengebühren in Bayern), the Free Voters successfully got a binding referendum that would remove college tuitions. The referendum was supported by a range of teacher's unions, college associations, and parties. After earning 14.3% of the votes cast, the referendum was approved by the CSU-FDP coalition in the Bavarian Parliament and the referendum's provisions took effect during the 2013/2014 school year. 219 million euros were allocated from the state's budget during that year for the endeavor.

The Free Voters also advocate for free nurseries in order to reduce financial stress on parents.

Michael Piazolo (FW) has served as the Minister of Education and Culture since 12 November 2018.

=== Energy and environment policy ===
The Free Voters upon entering into a coalition government announced their support for CO_{2} neutral and renewable energy sources. To that end, they have pledged increased funding for the sciences and research. They have also been in talks with companies such as BMW about electromobility as a method of combating climate change, which is part of their broader goal of electrifying the public transportation system in Bavaria. The Free Voters opposed a project of building large power lines between northern Germany and Bavaria.

With regards to transportation, the Free Voters propose a diesel ban and support multiple measures to make automobiles more ecologically friendly, such as investing in electric cars.

=== Economic and fiscal policy ===
Owing to their origins as local community and political organizations, the Free Voters’ economic policy focuses much of its attention towards "strengthening the rural affairs", says Aiwanger. This means increased attention by the state on the rural and agricultural sectors of the economy. They propose extending and expanding services in rural areas by protecting preexisting hospitals and birth clinics, while also erecting new ones. They again want to make nurseries free, which would ease the financial burden on families. "No topic can be too small", explained Aiwanger.

The Free Voters organized a successful referendum, whereby they abolished road improvement contribution taxes (German: Straßenausbaubeiträge, shortened to Strab), a type of tax levied on the homeowners of a street which would be used to pay for the street's maintenance.

=== Migration and asylum policy ===
Despite disagreeing with the Merkel government's handling of the European migrant crisis, the Free Voters are not against accepting refugees and asylum seekers, and advocate for their smooth and timely integration into Germany. The party opposes the year-long ban imposed on refugees upon their arrival to Germany, arguing that it hinders integration, "One should look at the individual", says Aiwanger. This policy extends into education as well, where the integration of refugees into job education programs and other forms of education is an important topic for the Free Voters’ education policy.

Their criticism of the Merkel government's handling of the issue stems from their skepticism of economic migrants, whom they see as not having valid reasons to seek refuge, and as such should be humanely returned to their home countries. Those who are fleeing violence and persecution, however, should be quickly integrate into society, while also combating the causes of their flight.

The Free Voters also argue for the introduction of a points-based merit system for immigration based on the Canadian or Australian models.

== Election results ==
=== Landtag of Bavaria ===
Election	Constituency (Note: Erststimmen)		Party list (Note: Zweitstimmen)		% of overall votes	Seats	+/–	Government
Election	Votes	%	Votes	%	% of overall votes	Seats	+/–	Government
1998	251,742	4.1 (#4)	194,373	3.2 (#5)	3.7 (#4)	0 / 204	New	CSU majority
2003	228,831	4.5 (#4)	182,475	3.6 (#4)	4.0 (#4)	0 / 180	0	CSU majority
2008	567,509	10.6 (#3)	518,387	9.8 (#3)	10.2 (#3)	21 / 187	▲21	CSU–FDP
2013	580,701	9.8 (#3)	481,852	8.2 (#4)	9.0 (#3)	19 / 180	▼2	CSU majority
2018	809,666	11.9 (#3)	763,126	11.3 (#3)	11.6 (#3)	27 / 205	▲8	CSU–FW
2023	1,077,893	15.8 (#2)	1,085,460	15.9 (#2)	15.8 (#2)	37 / 203	▲10	CSU–FW

=== Bezirkstags ===
Election year	No. of overall seats won	+/–
1998	9 / 204	n/a
2003	10 / 180	▲1
2008	24 / 193	▲14
2013	21 / 195	▼3
2018	32 / 238	▲11
