= Stoiber =

Stoiber is a German surname. Notable people with the surname include:

- Edmund Stoiber (born 1941), German politician, former Minister President of the state of Bavaria
- Karin Stoiber (born 1943), former First Lady of Bavaria
- Hans Stoiber (1918–2015), Austrian poet
