= MünchenKlang =

German choir and orchestra ensemble

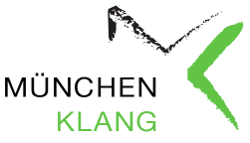

Background information
- Origin: Munich, Germany
- Genres: Classical
- Years active: 2013–present
- Members: Thomas Hefele (conductor)
- Website: www.MuenchenKlang.de

MünchenKlang is a Munich ensemble comprising a choir and an orchestra. The name is a compound of its city of origin (München) and the German word for sound (Klang).

== History ==
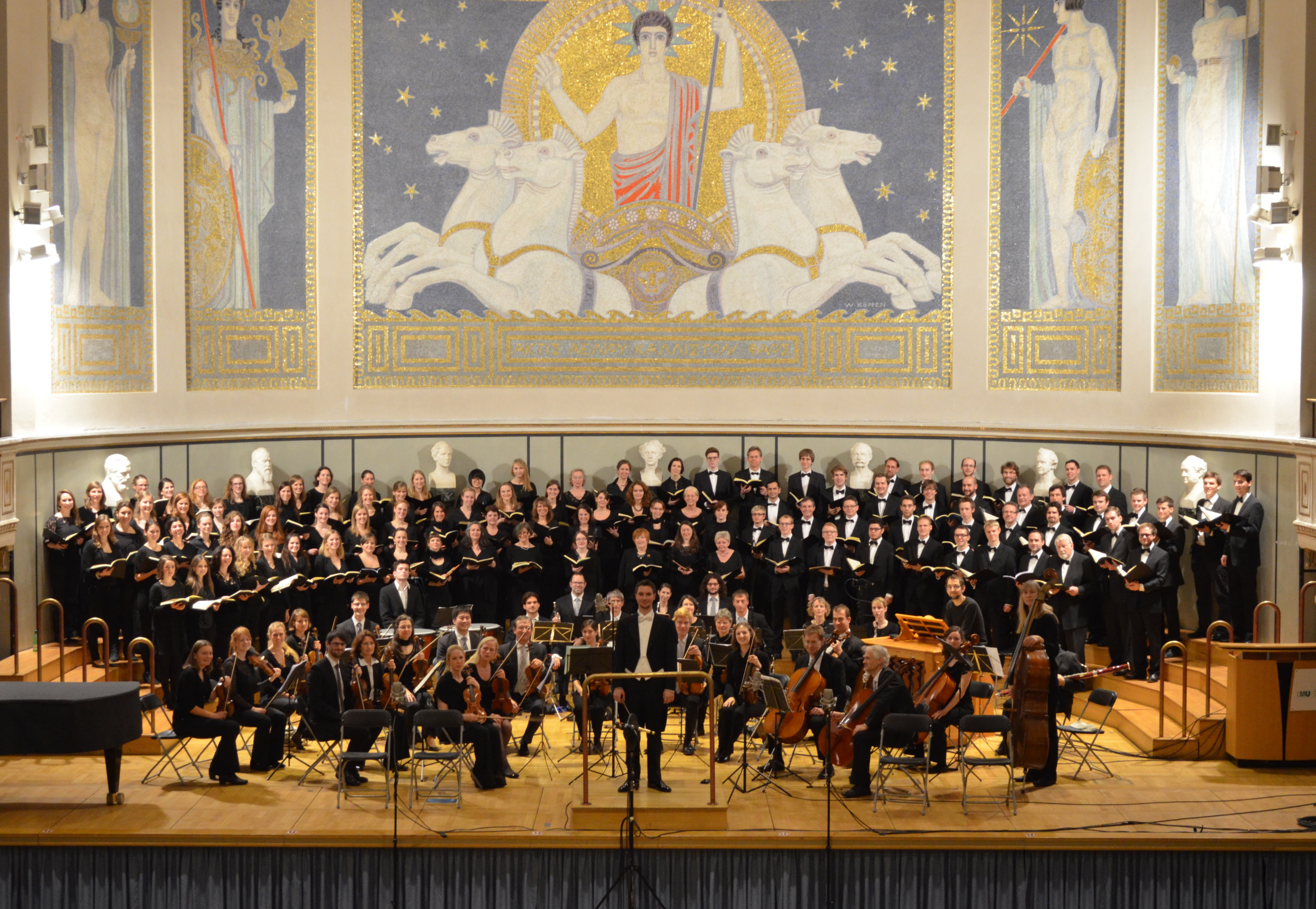
MünchenKlang, Christmas 2014 in the Große Aula of LMU Munich

MünchenKlang was founded in 2013 by a group of musically interested students with the intention of performing classical music for choir and orchestra. The orchestra is established as a project orchestra, rehearsing only a few weekends per project to prepare a concert. The choir rehearses weekly. There are more than 150 members of different age groups, professions and disciplines of study. MünchenKlang is organised as a noncommercial voluntary association.

The ensemble performs two or three concerts per year in different venues, such as the Neue Pfarrkirche St. Margaret, the Große Aula of LMU Munich or the Philharmonie am Gasteig. Concert tours have led MünchenKlang to perform in the Brucknerhaus in Linz, Austria and as part of the Expo 2015 programme at the Castello Sforzesco in Milan, Italy. The ensemble has collaborated with ARD award winning singers Sumi Hwang and Wilhelm Schwinghammer.

The association also pursues cultural policy objectives and engages in an ongoing debate regarding the new Munich concert hall. Around 500 citizens followed MünchenKlang's call to demonstrate for a new concert hall on March 7, 2015 at the Odeonsplatz. MünchenKlang supports the association Konzertsaal München e.V., which was founded by the Bavarian minister of state Kurt Faltlhauser.

== Conductors ==
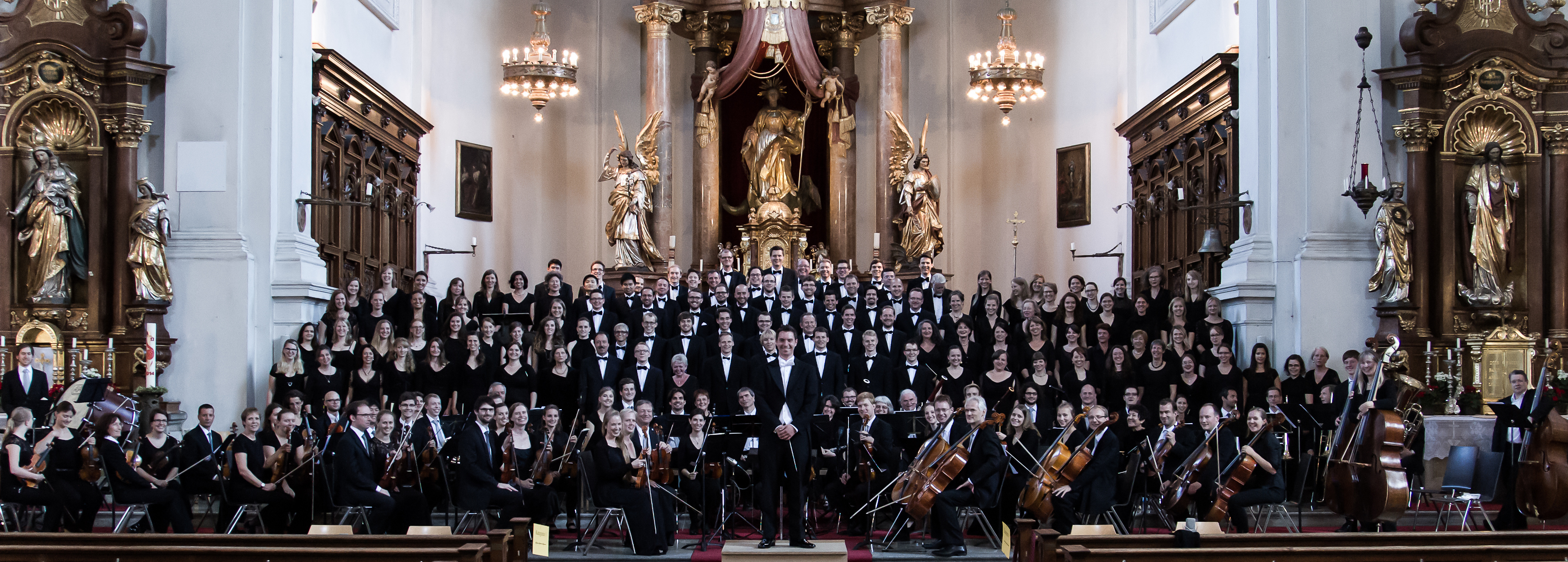
MünchenKlang, Summer 2014 in the Neue Pfarrkirche St. Margaret, Munich

Since their inception in 2013, the choir and orchestra of MünchenKlang have been conducted by Thomas Hefele. Under his baton the ensemble has performed pieces such as the Messa da Requiem by Giuseppe Verdi, the Christmas Oratorio by Johann Sebastian Bach, the Italian Symphony by Felix Mendelssohn and the cantata Der Stern von Bethlehem (The Star of Bethlehem) by Josef Rheinberger.
