= Beckstein =

Beckstein may refer to:

- Beckstein (Lauda-Königshofen), district of Lauda-Königshofen, a town in the Main-Tauber district in Baden-Württemberg, Germany.

== People with the name ==
- Günther Beckstein (1943), German CSU politician from Bavaria
- Sinclair Beckstein, author of the book "Oh Brother, Where Art Thou?", an amalgamation of the names of authors Upton Sinclair, Sinclair Lewis, and John Steinbeck
