= Erwin Huber =

German politician (born 1946)

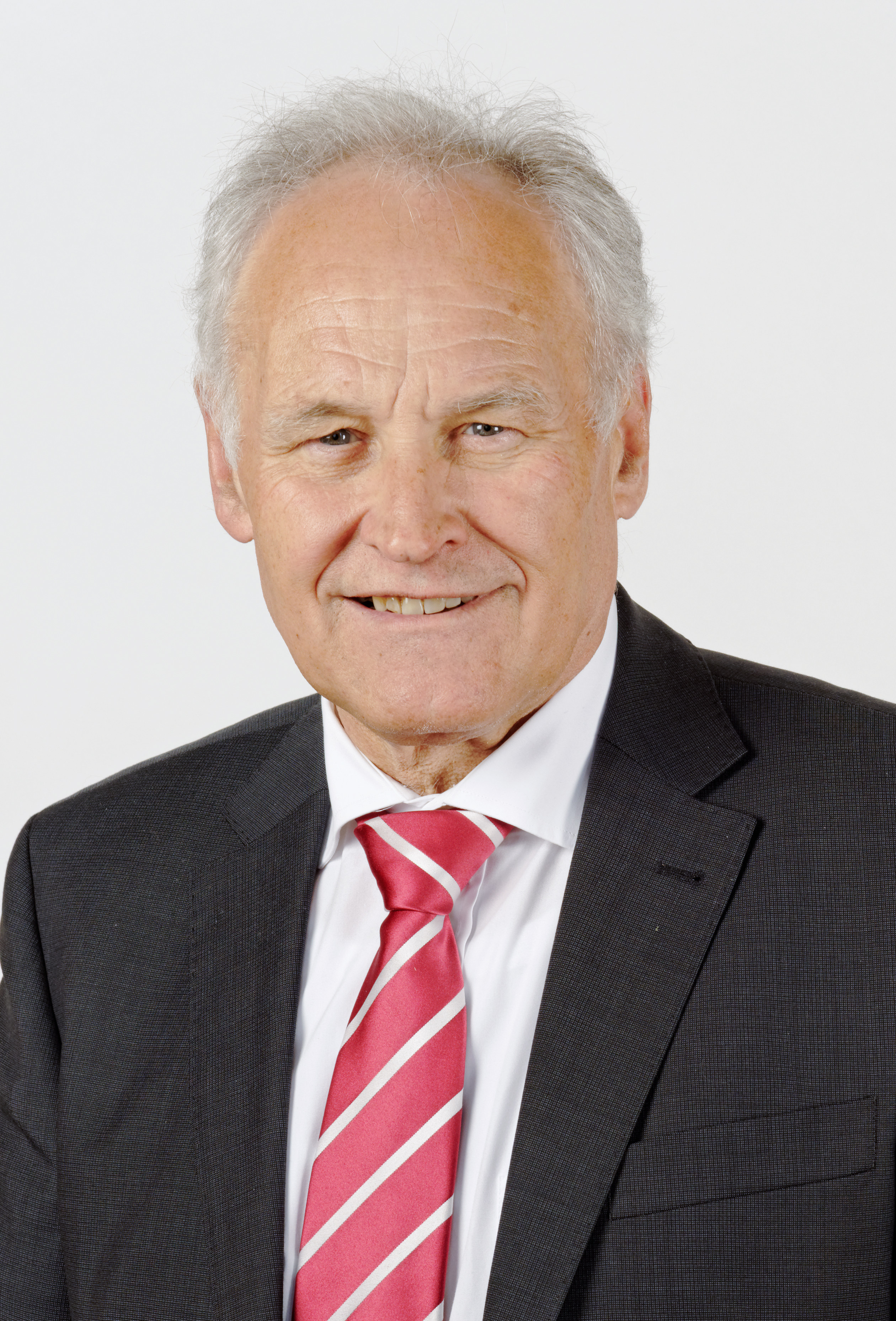
- Huber in 2012

Leader of the Christian Social Union
- In office 29 September 2007 – 25 October 2008
- General Secretary: Christine Haderthauer
- Preceded by: Edmund Stoiber
- Succeeded by: Horst Seehofer

Minister of Finance of Bavaria
- In office 16 October 2007 – 27 October 2008
- Prime Minister: Günther Beckstein
- Preceded by: Kurt Faltlhauser
- Succeeded by: Georg Fahrenschon
- In office 15 November 1995 – 6 October 1998
- Prime Minister: Edmund Stoiber
- Preceded by: Georg Freiherr von Waldenfels
- Succeeded by: Kurt Faltlhauser

Minister of Economics, Energy and Technology of Bavaria
- In office 29 November 2005 – 15 October 2007
- Prime Minister: Edmund Stoiber
- Preceded by: Otto Wiesheu
- Succeeded by: Emilia Müller

Chief of the Bavarian State Chancellery
- In office 6 October 1998 – 29 November 2005
- Prime Minister: Edmund Stoiber
- Preceded by: Kurt Faltlhauser
- Succeeded by: Eberhard Sinner
- In office 27 October 1994 – 15 November 1995
- Prime Minister: Edmund Stoiber
- Preceded by: Herbert Huber
- Succeeded by: Kurt Faltlhauser

General Secretary of the Christian Social Union
- In office 12 September 1988 – 12 December 1994
- Leader: Franz Josef Strauß; Theo Waigel
- Preceded by: Gerold Tandler
- Succeeded by: Bernd Protzner

Member of the Landtag of Bavaria for Dingolfing
- In office 27 October 1974 – 14 October 2018
- Preceded by: Unknown
- Succeeded by: Petra Loibl

Personal details
- Born: 26 July 1946 (age 79) Reisbach, Germany
- Party: CSU
- Spouse: Helma Huber
- Children: 2

Erwin Huber (born 26 July 1946) is a German politician. He was chairman of the Christian Social Union (CSU) from 2007 to 2008.

== Early life ==
Erwin Huber was born in Reisbach in the district of Dingolfing-Landau, Bavaria. He attended elementary school in Reisbach and a secondary modern in Dingolfing. His first professional job was at the Bavarian administration of finance in 1963. After several jobs in the financial sector, he entered the Bavarian State Ministry of Finance in 1970. During this period he studied Economics at LMU Munich.

== Political career ==
Huber was elected to the Landtag of Bavaria in 1978 and from 1988 to 1994 was Secretary-General of the Christian Social Union. He entered the Bavarian state government in 1994 and has served as Director of the Bavarian State Chancellery (1993–1994 and 1998–2005), Minister of State for Finance (1994–1998) and Minister of State for Federal Matters and Administrative Reform (2003–2005). In 2005, he was appointed as Bavarian Minister of State for Economics, Transport and Technology, a post he held until 2007 when he was once again appointed Minister of State for Finances.

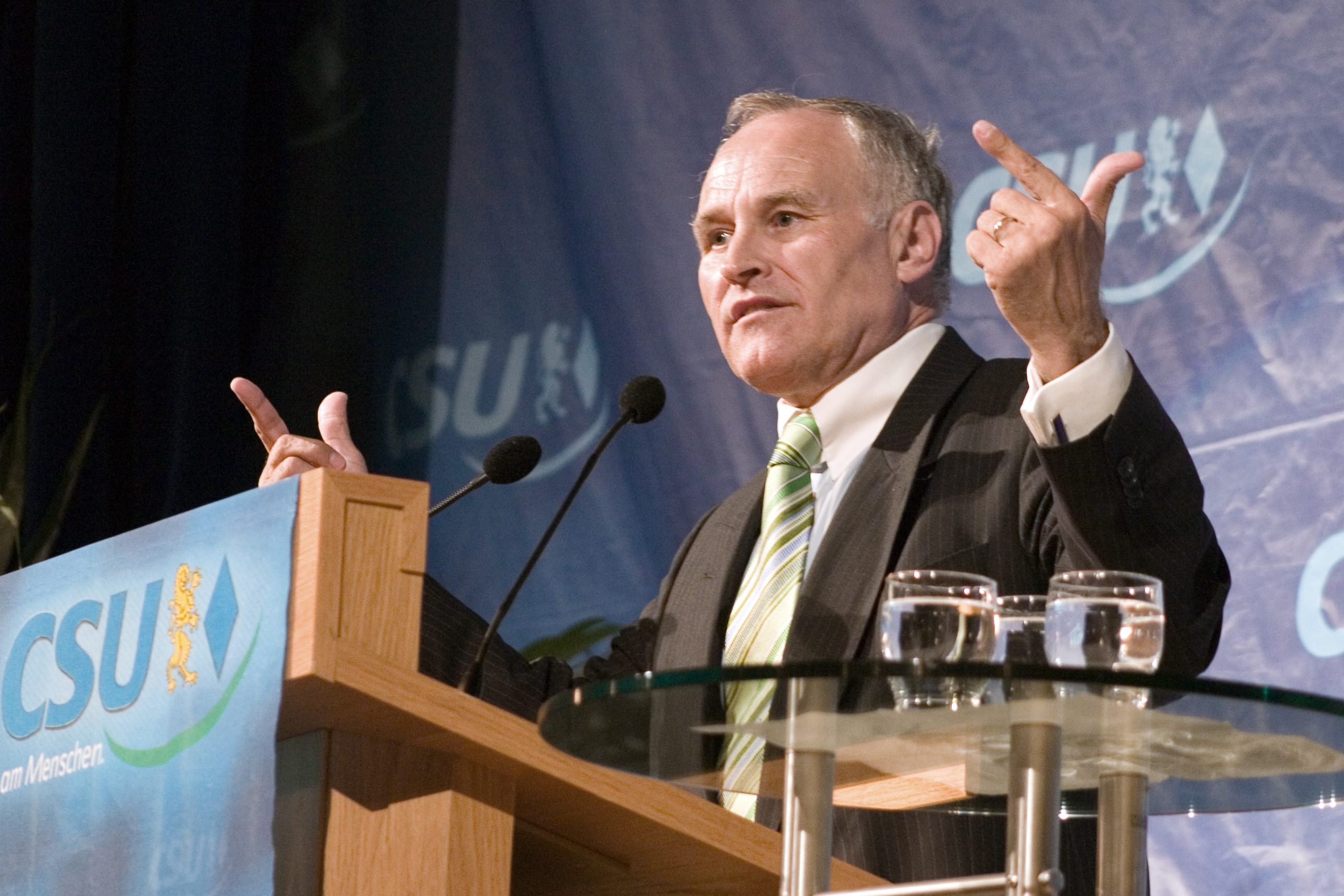
Erwin Huber (May 2007)

In September 2007, he was elected chairman of his party. Huber, a loyalist of outgoing chairman Edmund Stoiber, received 58% of the vote, defeating the Federal Agriculture Minister Horst Seehofer, who received 39% of the vote, and party rebel Gabriele Pauli, who gained roughly 3%.

Two days after the state elections of 2008, in which the CSU received only 43.4% of the vote (down from 60.7% in the state elections of 2003), Huber announced his resignation. He was succeeded by Horst Seehofer.

== Personal life ==
Erwin Huber is a Roman Catholic and is married with two children.
