= Leader of the Christian Social Union in Bavaria =

Leader of the Christian Social Union
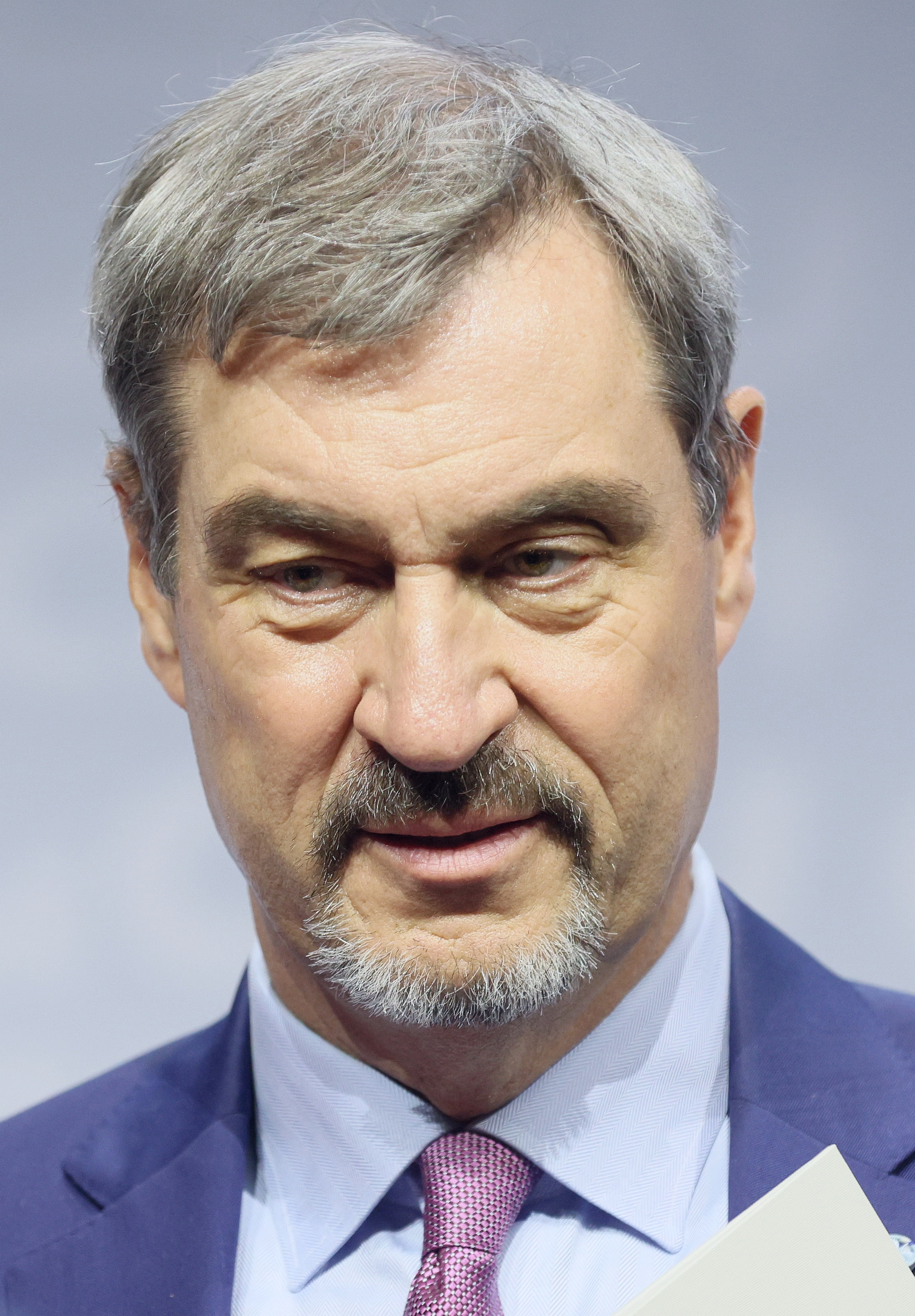
- Incumbent; Markus Söder since 19 January 2019
- Member of: Federal Executive; Presidium
- Inaugural holder: Josef Müller
- Formation: 17 December 1945
- Deputy: Kurt Gribl; Angelika Niebler; Dorothee Bär; Manfred Weber; Melanie Huml

The Leader of the Christian Social Union (Vorsitzender der Christlich-Sozialen Union) is the most senior political figure within the Christian Social Union in Bavaria. Since 19 January 2019, the office has been held by Markus Söder; who is the 9th leader of the party.

The Leader of the Christian Social Union is supported by a General Secretary, which since 2018 has been Markus Blume. Furthermore, the leader is supported by five deputy leaders, which currently are Kurt Gribl, Angelika Niebler, Dorothee Bär, Manfred Weber and Melanie Huml.

== Leaders of the Christian Social Union (1945–present) ==
A list of the 8 leaders since 1945

Leader	Portrait	Took office	Left office	Chancellor
Josef Müller		17 December 1945	28 May 1949	Konrad Adenauer
Hans Ehard		28 May 1949	22 January 1955	Konrad Adenauer
Hanns Seidel		22 January 1955	16 February 1961	Konrad Adenauer
Franz Josef Strauss		18 March 1961	3 October 1988	Konrad Adenauer; Ludwig Erhard; Kurt Georg Kiesinger; Willy Brandt; Helmut Schmidt; Helmut Kohl
Theodor Waigel		16 November 1988	16 January 1999	Helmut Kohl Gerhard Schröder
Edmund Stoiber		16 January 1999	29 September 2007	Gerhard Schröder Angela Merkel
Erwin Huber		29 September 2007	25 October 2008	Angela Merkel
Horst Seehofer		25 October 2008	19 January 2019	Angela Merkel
Markus Söder		19 January 2019	Incumbent	Angela Merkel; Olaf Scholz Friedrich Merz

== See also ==
- Leader of the Social Democratic Party of Germany
- Leader of the Christian Democratic Union of Germany
- Social Democratic Party of Germany
- Christian Democratic Union of Germany
- Alliance '90/The Greens
