= Kurt Faltlhauser =

German politician (born 1940)

Minister for Finance of Bavaria
- In office 6 October 1998 – 16 October 2007
- Minister-President: Edmund Stoiber
- Preceded by: Erwin Huber
- Succeeded by: Erwin Huber

Head of the State Chancellery of Bavaria
- In office 15 November 1995 – 6 October 1998
- Minister-President: Edmund Stoiber
- Preceded by: Erwin Huber
- Succeeded by: Erwin Huber

Member of the Landtag of Bavaria
- In office 28 September 1998 – 27 October 2008
- Constituency: Upper Bavaria
- In office 12 November 1974 – 3 October 1980
- Preceded by: Constituency established
- Succeeded by: Manfred Hölzl
- Constituency: Munich-Pasing

Member of the Bundestag; for Munich West/Centre
- In office 4 November 1980 – 20 November 1995
- Preceded by: Ekkehard Voigt
- Succeeded by: Matthäus Strebl

Personal details
- Born: 14 September 1940 (age 85) Munich, Germany
- Party: Christian Social Union
- Children: 2
- Education: LMU Munich; Free University of Berlin; University of Mainz

Kurt Faltlhauser (born 14 September 1940) is a German politician, representative of the Christian Social Union of Bavaria.

Faltlhauser was born in Munich. He was a member of the Landtag of Bavaria between 1974 and 1980 and 1998 and 2008. He was from 1994 to 1995 Parliamentary Secretary to the Federal Minister of Finance, from 1995 to 1998 Bavarian State Minister and Head of the State Chancellery and from 1998 to 2007 Bavarian State Minister of Finance.

== Publications ==
- Miteigentum – Das Pieroth-Modell in der Praxis, ECON-Verlag, Düsseldorf und Wien 1971, ISBN 3-430-12608-8
- Geld und Gemeinden, Südwest Information, München 1972
- Klaus Esser, Kurt Faltlhauser: Beteiligungsmodelle, Verlag Moderne Industrie, München 1974, ISBN 3-478-11070-X
- Kurt Faltlhauser: Unternehmen und Gesellschaft, Theorie und Praxis der Sozialbilanz, Erich Schmidt Verlag, Berlin 1978, ISBN 3-503-01723-2
- Kurt Faltlhauser, Edmund Stoiber: Politik aus Bayern., Busse und Seewald, Herford 1982, ISBN 3-512-00447-4
- Steuerstrategie, Kölner Universitätsverlag, Köln 1988
- Im Münchner Westen. Von der Wies'n bis Aubing., Bayerland VA, Dachau 1989, ISBN 3-89251-062-8
- Klaus Rose, Kurt Faltlhauser: Die Haushälter – Ist die Zukunft finanzierbar?, Kölner Universitätsverlag, Köln 1990, ISBN 3-87427-043-2
- Ansichten aus dem Münchner Westen, Bayerland VA, Dachau 1993, ISBN 3-89251-171-3
- Finanzpolitik der Zukunft – Das Prinzip Nachhaltigkeit, Olzog, München 2002, ISBN 3-7892-8092-5

== See also ==
- List of Bavarian Christian Social Union politicians
