= Bochov =

- Town
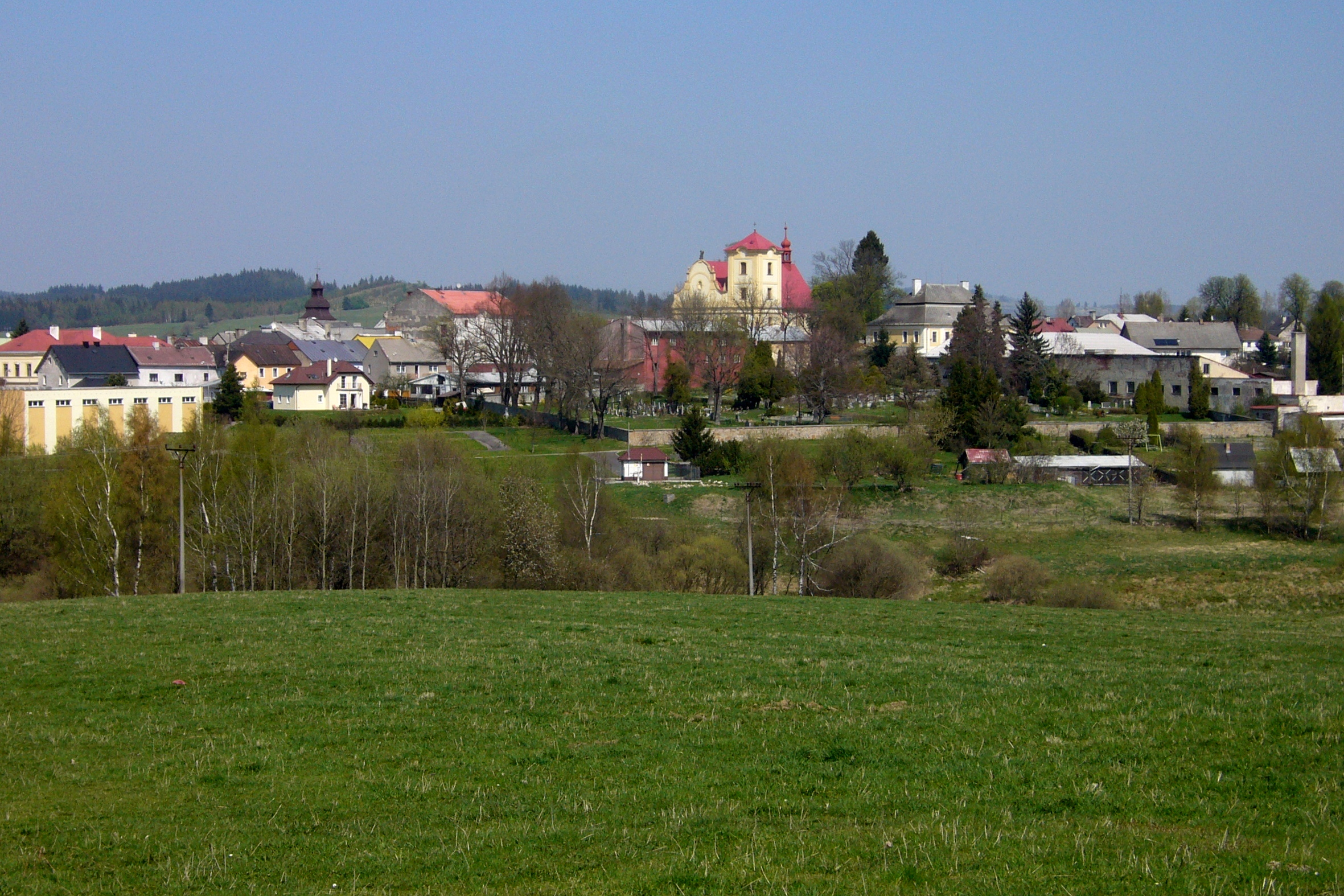
- Bochov seen from the Hartenštejn Castle

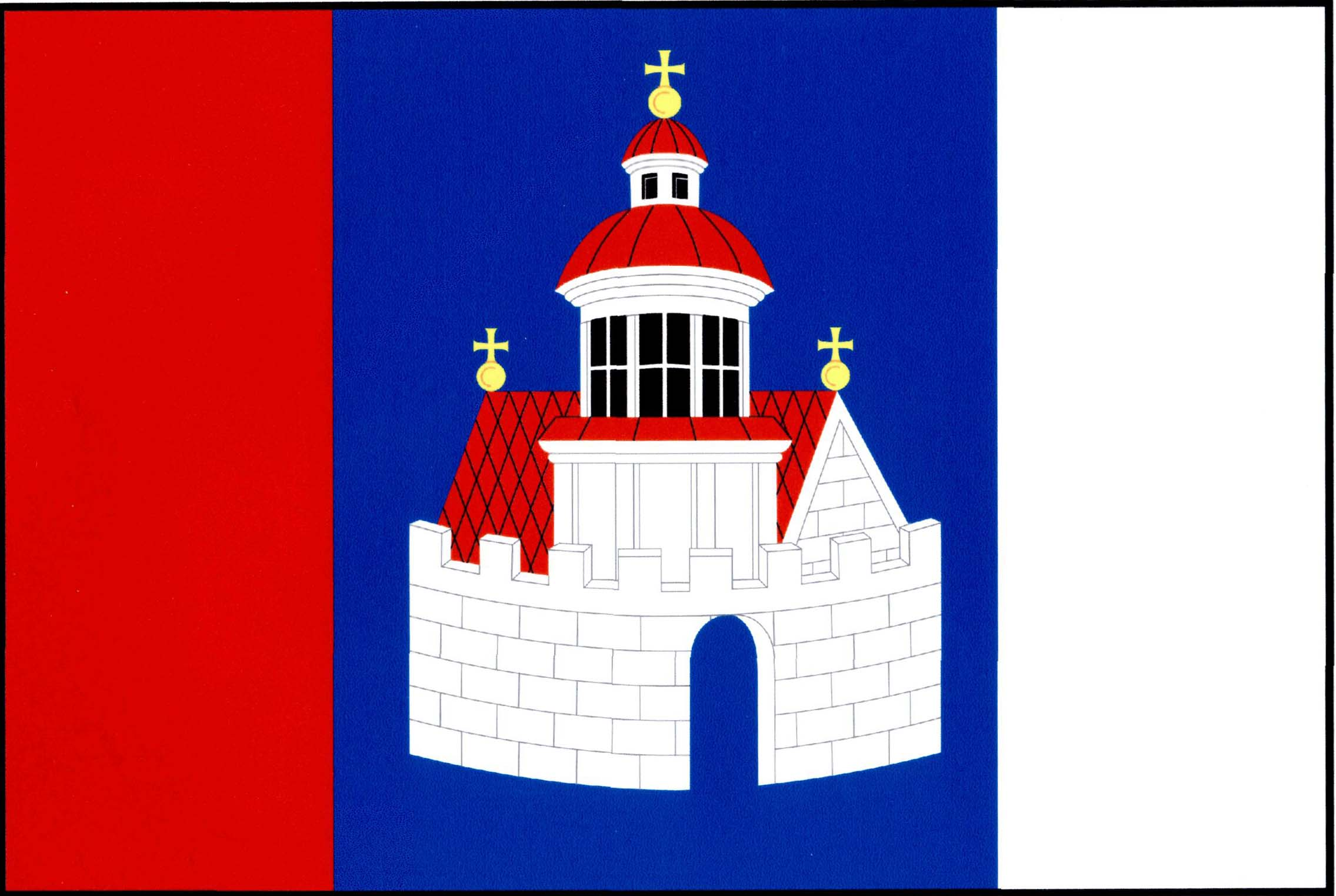
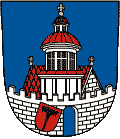
- Flag Coat of arms

- Location in the Czech Republic
- Coordinates: 50°9′19″N 13°2′22″E
- Country: Czech Republic
- Region: Karlovy Vary
- District: Karlovy Vary
- First mentioned: 1325

Government
  - Mayor: Miroslav Egert

Area
  - Total: 95.69 km^{2} (36.95 sq mi)
- Elevation: 668 m (2,192 ft)

Population (2026-01-01)
  - Total: 1,876
  - Density: 19.60/km^{2} (50.78/sq mi)
- Time zone: UTC+1 (CET)
  - Summer (DST): UTC+2 (CEST)
- Postal code: 364 71
- Website: www.mesto-bochov.cz

Bochov (Czech pronunciation: [ˈboxof]; German: Buchau) is a town in Karlovy Vary District in the Karlovy Vary Region of the Czech Republic. It has about 1,900 inhabitants.

== Administrative division ==
Bochov consists of 17 municipal parts (in brackets population according to the 2021 census):

- Bochov (1,177)
- Číhaná (7)
- Dlouhá Lomnice (92)
- Herstošice (26)
- Hlineč (3)
- Javorná (71)
- Jesínky (1)
- Kozlov (84)
- Mirotice (21)
- Německý Chloumek (22)
- Nové Kounice (28)
- Polom (12)
- Rybničná (79)
- Sovolusky (24)
- Teleč (26)
- Těšetice (46)
- Údrč (99)

== Geography ==
Bochov is located about 15 kilometres (9 mi) southeast of Karlovy Vary. It lies on the border of three nature regions. The eastern part of the municipal territory with the town proper lies in the Teplá Highlands, the western part lies in the Slavkov Forest, and a small part in the northeast extends into the Doupov Mountains. The highest point is the hill Mirotický vrch at 791 m (2,595 ft) above sea level. The Střela River flows along the southern municipal border. The area of Bochov is rich in fishponds.

== History ==
The first written mention of Bochov is from 1325, when it was promoted to a market town. It was founded in the first half of the 14th century as a mining settlement, but the tin reserves here were soon mined.

From 1938 to 1945, Bochov was annexed by Nazi Germany and administered as part of the Reichsgau Sudetenland. After World War II, the German-speaking population was expelled.

== Demographics ==
Historical population

Year	Pop.	±%
1869	7,243	—
1880	7,184	−0.8%
1890	7,091	−1.3%
1900	7,005	−1.2%
1910	6,864	−2.0%

Year	Pop.	±%
1921	6,487	−5.5%
1930	6,328	−2.5%
1950	2,304	−63.6%
1961	2,079	−9.8%
1970	2,166	+4.2%

Year	Pop.	±%
1980	1,937	−10.6%
1991	1,760	−9.1%
2001	1,950	+10.8%
2011	1,932	−0.9%
2021	1,818	−5.9%

Source: Censuses

== Transport ==
The I/6 road (part of the European route E48), which replaces the incomplete section of the D6 motorway from Prague to Karlovy Vary, runs through the town.

== Sights ==
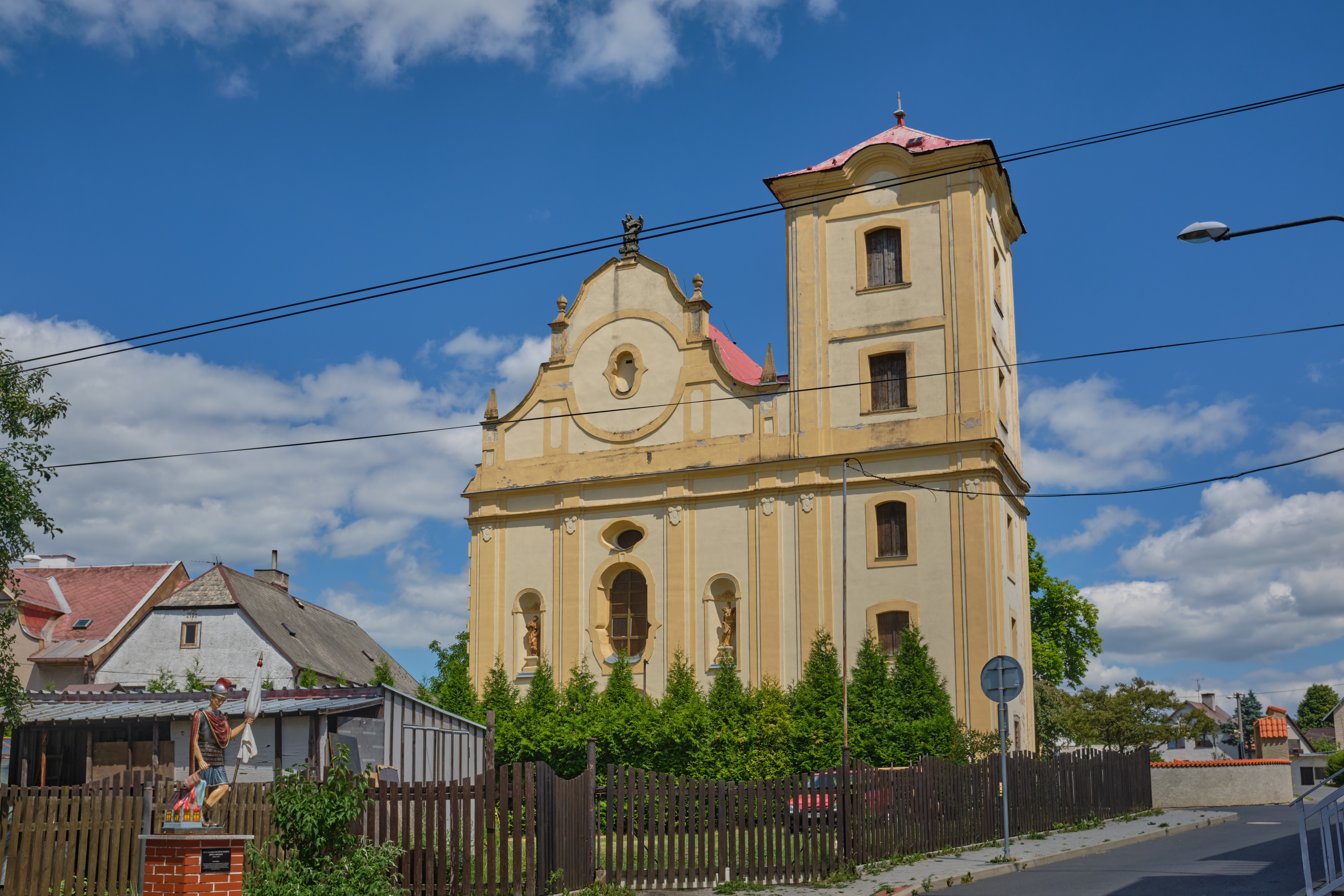
Church of Saint Michael the Archangel

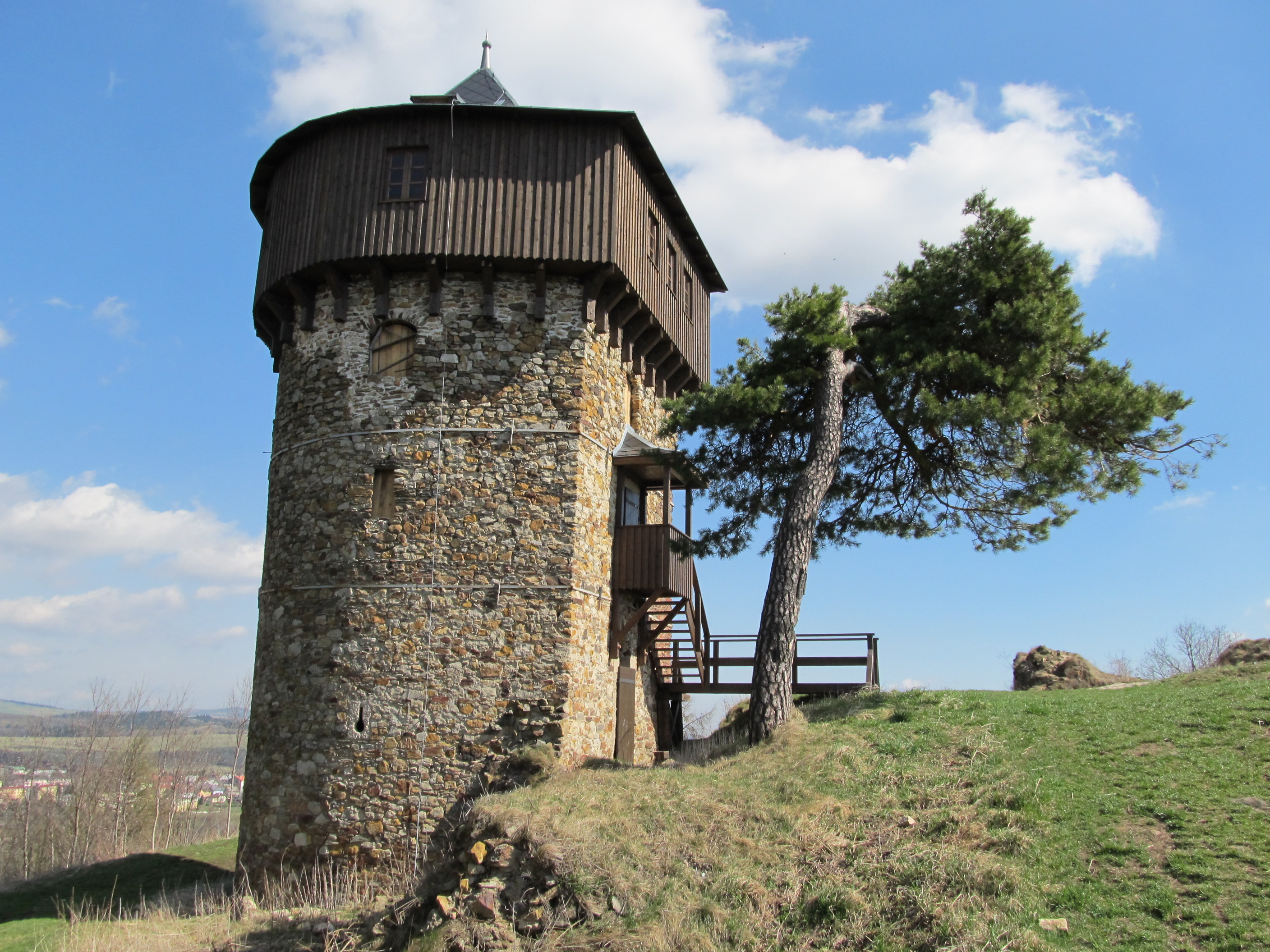
Tower of the Hartenštejn Castle

The main landmark of Bochov is the Church of Saint Michael the Archangel. It was built in the late Gothic style in the 15th century and rebuilt ito its present early Baroque form in 1666–1667, after it was damages by a fire. In the 18th century, further modifications were made.

A notable landmark of the town square is the Baroque town hall, which dates from 1818. In the middle of the town square is a massive granite fountain from the 18th century.

A tourist destination is a ruin of the Hartenštejn Castle on a hill near the town. It was built in the 1460s–1470s and belonged to the best defense systems in Bohemia, but already in 1573, it was abandoned. The reconstructed tower of Hartenštejn Castle now serves as an observation tower.

The predecessor of Hartenštejn was Hungerberg Castle, located on the outskirts of Bochov. It was founded in the 14th century and most likely ruined in 1469. Only a moat and a rampart have survived from the castle to this day.

In Javorná is the Javorná Castle and the Church of Saint John of Nepomuk. The Baroque castle was built in 1729–1730 on the site of a fortress from the 14th century. The church, located next to the castle, was originally a castle chapel.

The Church of Saint Leonard is located in Údrč. This originally Gothic church was rebuilt in the Neoclassical style after a fire in 1783.

== Notable people ==
- Fanni Blatny (1873–1949), politician
- Karin Stoiber (born 1943), First Lady of Bavaria
