= Angelika Niebler =

German lawyer and politician (born 1963)

Angelika Niebler MEP
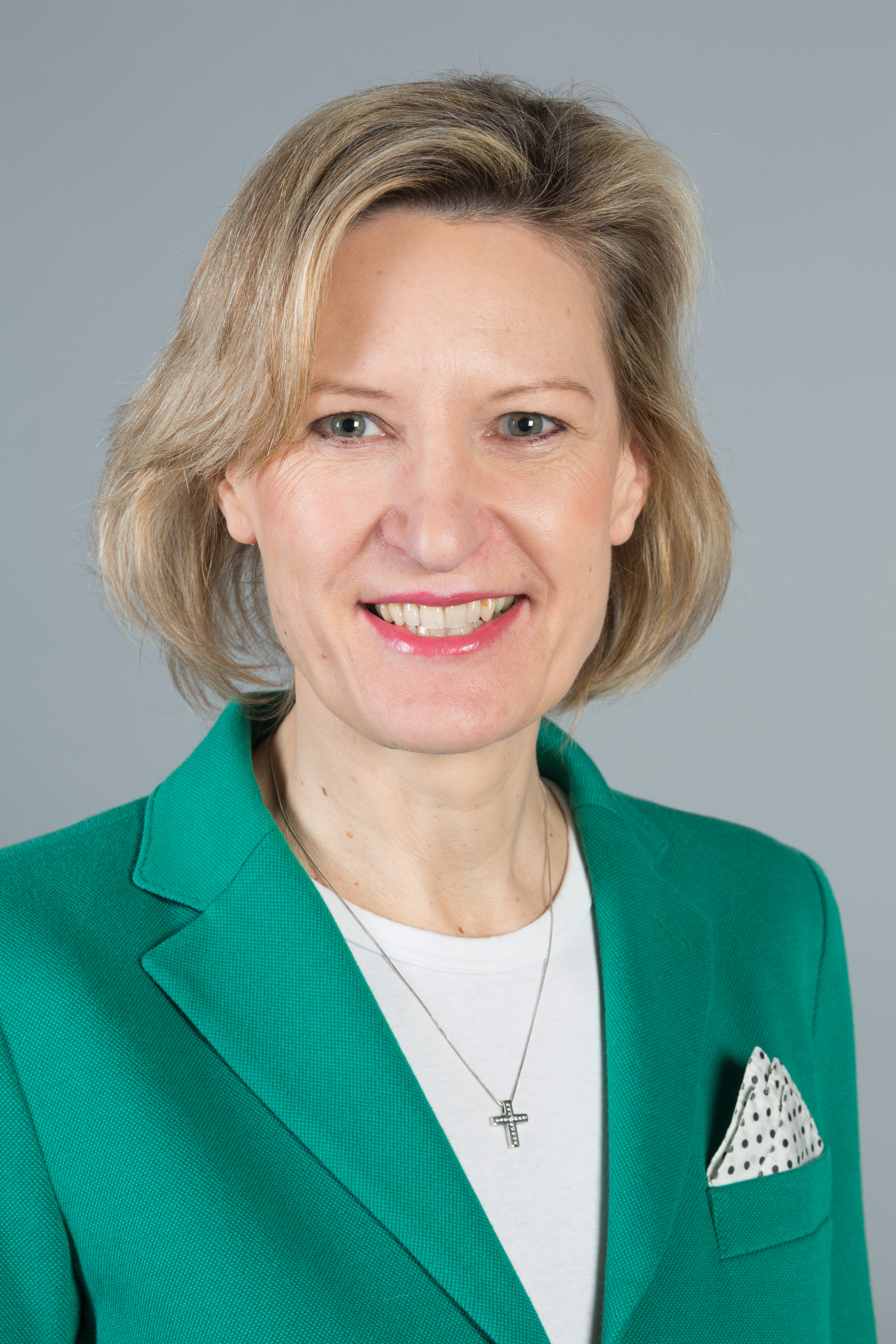

Member of the European Parliament
- Incumbent
- Assumed office 1 July 1999
- Constituency: Germany

Personal details
- Born: 18 February 1963 (age 63) Munich, Bavaria, Germany
- Party: German: Christian Social Union; EU: European People's Party
- Spouse: Michael Niebler (m. 1995)
- Education: LMU Munich; University of Geneva; University of Edinburgh
- Website: www.angelika-niebler.de

Video Statement (English) / (German)

Angelika Niebler (née Rupertseder; born 18 February 1963) is a German lawyer and politician who has been serving as a Member of the European Parliament (MEP) since 1999. She is a member of the Christian Social Union in Bavaria, part of the European People's Party. Since 2015, she has been serving as her party's deputy chairwoman, under the leadership of successive chairmen Horst Seehofer and Markus Söder.

== Education ==
- 1988: First state law examination
- 1991: Second state law examination
- 1992: Doctor of law, dissertation: Der Einsatz einer Expertensystemshell im Gesetzgebungsverfahren (English: "The use of expert systems in legislative procedure")

== Professional career ==
Niebler practiced with Lovells from 1991 to 1997 and – as Salary Partner – with Beiten Burkhardt from 1997 to 2004. From 2004 to 2015, she worked at Bird & Bird’s Munich office. In September 2015, she joined Gibson, Dunn & Crutcher’s Munich office as of counsel, where she supports the firm's Media, Entertainment & Technology Group as well as the Privacy, Cybersecurity and Consumer Protection Group.

In addition to practicing law, Niebler has been a visiting lecturer on Intellectual / Industrial Property Rights (IPR) at the Munich University of Applied Sciences (HM) since August 2016.

== Political career ==
=== Early political career ===
- since 1995: Member of the Upper Bavaria CSU district executive (since 2011 under the leadership of Ilse Aigner)
- since 1999: Chairman of the Women's Union of Upper Bavaria district and member of the Land executive of the Women's Union in Bavaria
- since 1999: Congress delegate and member of the executive, European People's Party
- since 1996: Member of Ebersberg district council

=== Member of the European Parliament, 1999–present ===
Since 1999, Niebler has been a Member of the European Parliament, where she has since served as the CDU/CSU Group parliamentary business manager in the EPP-ED Group at the European Parliament, and as member of the CDU/CSU Group and EPP-ED Group Executive.

Niebler sits on the European Parliament's Committee on Industry, Research and Energy and its Committee on Women's Rights and Gender Equality. She is a substitute for the Committee on the Internal Market and Consumer Protection.

Between 2007 and 2009, Niebler served as chairwoman of the Committee on Industry, Research and Energy; she was later replaced by Herbert Reul. In 2006, she was the author of the industry committee's report on the seventh Framework Program for Research and Technological Development, totalling €50.5 billion. From 2010 to 2012, she led the European Parliament's negotiations on overhauling European Union roaming regulations. She was her parliamentary group's shadow rapporteur on a non-binding 2021 motion in support of using “low-carbon hydrogen” made from fossil gas as a bridge towards 100% renewable production. Since 2021, she has been the parliament's lead rapporteur on the Data Governance Act.

In addition to her committee assignments, Niebler is part of the parliament's delegation for relations with the Gulf States, including Yemen. She is also a member of the European Internet Forum; the European Parliament Intergroup on the Digital Agenda; the European Parliament's Sky and Space Intergroup (SSI); and the European Parliament Intergroup on Biodiversity, Countryside, Hunting and Recreational Fisheries.

In early 2014, the CSU chose Niebler to be the party list's number 2 for the 2014 European elections, following Markus Ferber. She later replaced Ferber as leader of the CSU MEPs after the party's poor showing in the elections.

=== Role in national politics ===
Ahead of the 2002 German federal election, Edmund Stoiber included Niebler in his shadow cabinet for the Christian Democrats’ campaign to unseat incumbent Gerhard Schröder as chancellor.

Niebler later was a CSU delegate to the Federal Convention for the purpose of electing the President of Germany in 2004, 2009, 2010, 2012 and 2022. In 2015, Bavaria's Minister President Horst Seehofer nominated her as one of his deputies in the office of CSU chairman, making her part of the party's leadership. In the negotiations to form a fourth cabinet under Chancellor Angela Merkel following the 2017 federal elections, Niebler led the working group on families, alongside Annette Widmann-Mauz and Katarina Barley.

== Other activities ==
=== Corporate boards ===
- LVM Krankenversicherungs-AG, Member of the supervisory board (since 2015)
- Bavarian Savings Banks Association, Member of the advisory board (since 2009)
- Metabion International AG, Member of the supervisory board (since 2004)

=== Non-profit organizations ===
- Bavarian Economic Council, President (since 2018), Member of the Presidium (since 2008)
- Alfons Goppel Foundation, Member of the Board of Trustees
- European Academy of Bavaria, Member of the Board of Trustees
- European Energy Forum (EEF), Member
- European Foundation for the Care of Newborn Infants, Patron
- European Internet Foundation, Member of the Steering Committee
- German European Security Association (GESA), Founding Member
- German Institute for International and Security Affairs (SWP), vice-president of the council (since 2014)
- German Women Lawyers Association (DJB), Member
- Hanns Seidel Foundation, Member of the Board (since 2014)
- Ifo Institute for Economic Research, Member of the Board of Trustees
- Max Planck Society, Member of the Senate
- Max Planck Institute of Quantum Optics, Member of the Board of Trustees
- Technical University of Munich, Member of the Board of Trustees
- TÜV SÜD Stiftung, Member of the Board of Trustees
- ZDF, Member of the Television Board (2000-2016)

== Recognition ==
- 2017 – Order of Merit of the Federal Republic of Germany
- 2016 – Politico Europe's The 40 MEPs who actually matter in 2016
- 2011 – Bavarian Order of Merit
- 2010 – Bavarian Constitutional Medal in Silver
- 2008 – Medal for Extraordinary Merits for Bavaria in a United Europe
