= Fanni Blatny =

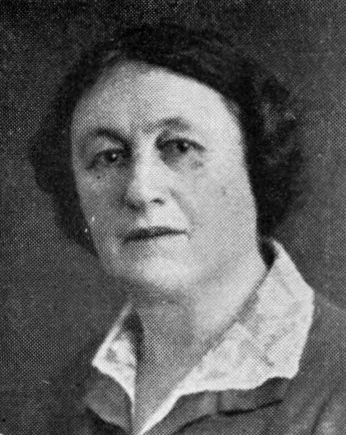

Member of the Chamber of Deputies
- In office 1920–1935
- Constituency: VII Karlovy Vary

Personal details
- Born: Franziska Feldmann-Fischer; 22 March 1873 Udritsch, Austria-Hungary
- Died: 22 December 1949 (aged 76) London, United Kingdom

Fanni Blatny (22 March 1873 – 22 December 1949) was a Czechoslovak politician. In 1920 she was elected to the Chamber of Deputies of Czechoslovakia, becoming one of the first group of female parliamentarians in the country.

== Biography ==
Blatny was born Franziska Feldmann-Fischer in Udritsch, Bohemia, Austria-Hungary (now Údrč, part of Bochov in the Czech Republic) in 1873. After her mother died, she and her father moved to Karlovy Vary. She joined the Social Democratic Workers' Party of Austria in 1901, and married Leopold Blatny, a trade unionist, in 1912. The couple moved to Vienna, but he died four years later and she returned to Karlovy Vary.

Following the formation of Czechoslovakia, she became a member of the German Social Democratic Workers' Party and was a candidate for the party in the 1920 parliamentary elections, in which she was elected to the Chamber of Deputies. She was also elected to the city council of Karlovy Vary. She was re-elected in 1925 and 1929, serving until the 1935 elections. She remained on Karlovy Vary city council until 1938.

She emigrated to the United Kingdom in 1939. Following World War II she ignored requests from Edvard Beneš to return home, and died in London in 1949.
