= Oberaudorf =

- Municipality
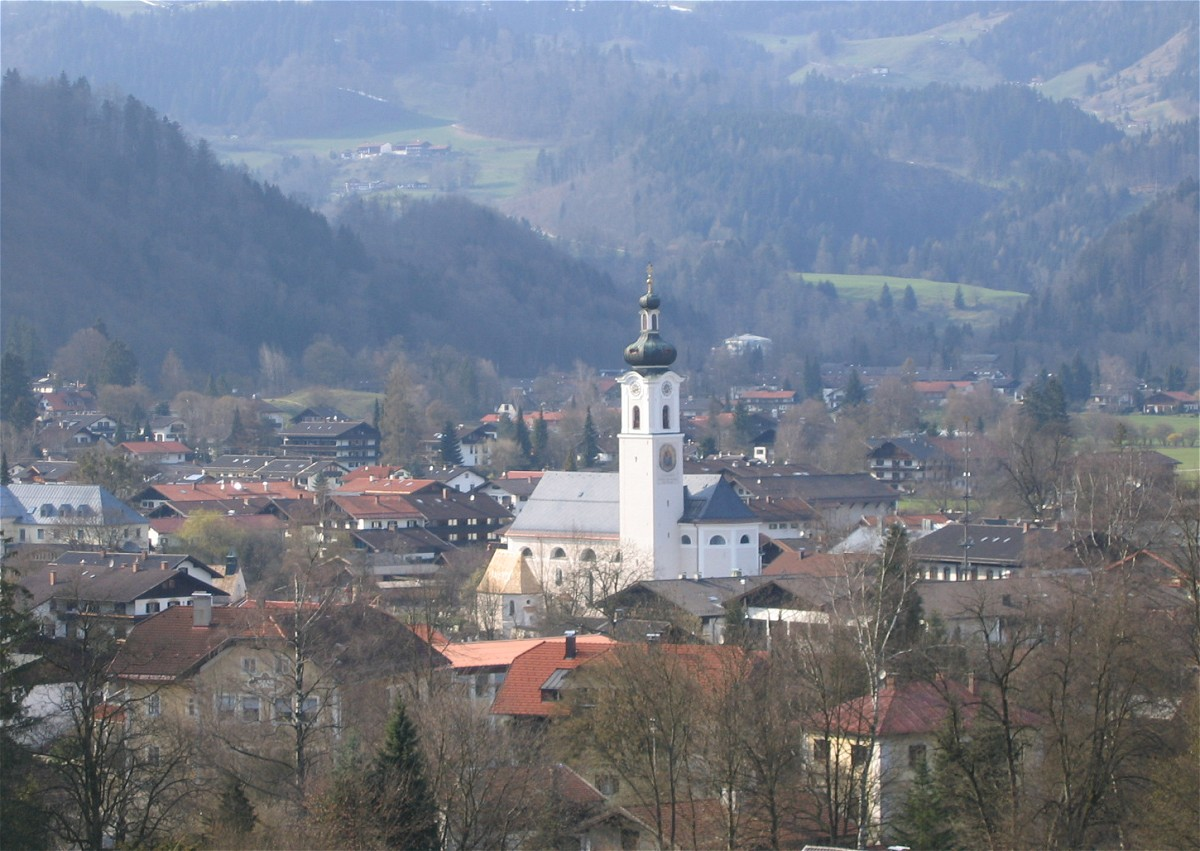
- Oberaudorf

- Coat of arms

- Location of Oberaudorf within Rosenheim district
- Interactive map of Oberaudorf
- Location within Germany Location within Bavaria
- Coordinates: 47°38′51″N 12°10′19″E
- Country: Germany
- State: Bavaria
- Admin. region: Oberbayern
- District: Rosenheim

Government
  - Mayor (2020–26): Matthias Bernhard

Area
  - Total: 59.29 km^{2} (22.89 sq mi)
- Elevation: 480 m (1,570 ft)

Population (2025-12-31)
  - Total: 5,128
  - Density: 86.49/km^{2} (224.0/sq mi)
- Time zone: UTC+01:00 (CET)
  - Summer (DST): UTC+02:00 (CEST)
- Postal codes: 83080
- Dialling codes: 08033
- Vehicle registration: RO
- Website: www.oberaudorf.de

Oberaudorf (German pronunciation: [ˈoːbɐˌʔaʊdɔʁf]) is a municipality in the district of Rosenheim in Bavaria, Germany. It lies on the river Inn.

Oberaudorf is the birthplace of Maria Ratzinger (née Peintner), the mother of German Pope Benedict XVI, as well as German politician Edmund Stoiber.

== Notable people ==
- Edmund Stoiber (born 1941), German politician
- Bastian Schweinsteiger (born 1984), German football player and 2014 World Cup winner
- Magnus von Braun (lived final years in Oberaudorf, dying in 1972), Weimar government minister and father of pioneering German-American rocket scientist Wernher von Braun

== See also ==
- Reisach Priory
