= Reisach Priory =

Monastery in Bavaria, Germany

Coordinates: 47°39′52″N 12°10′33″E

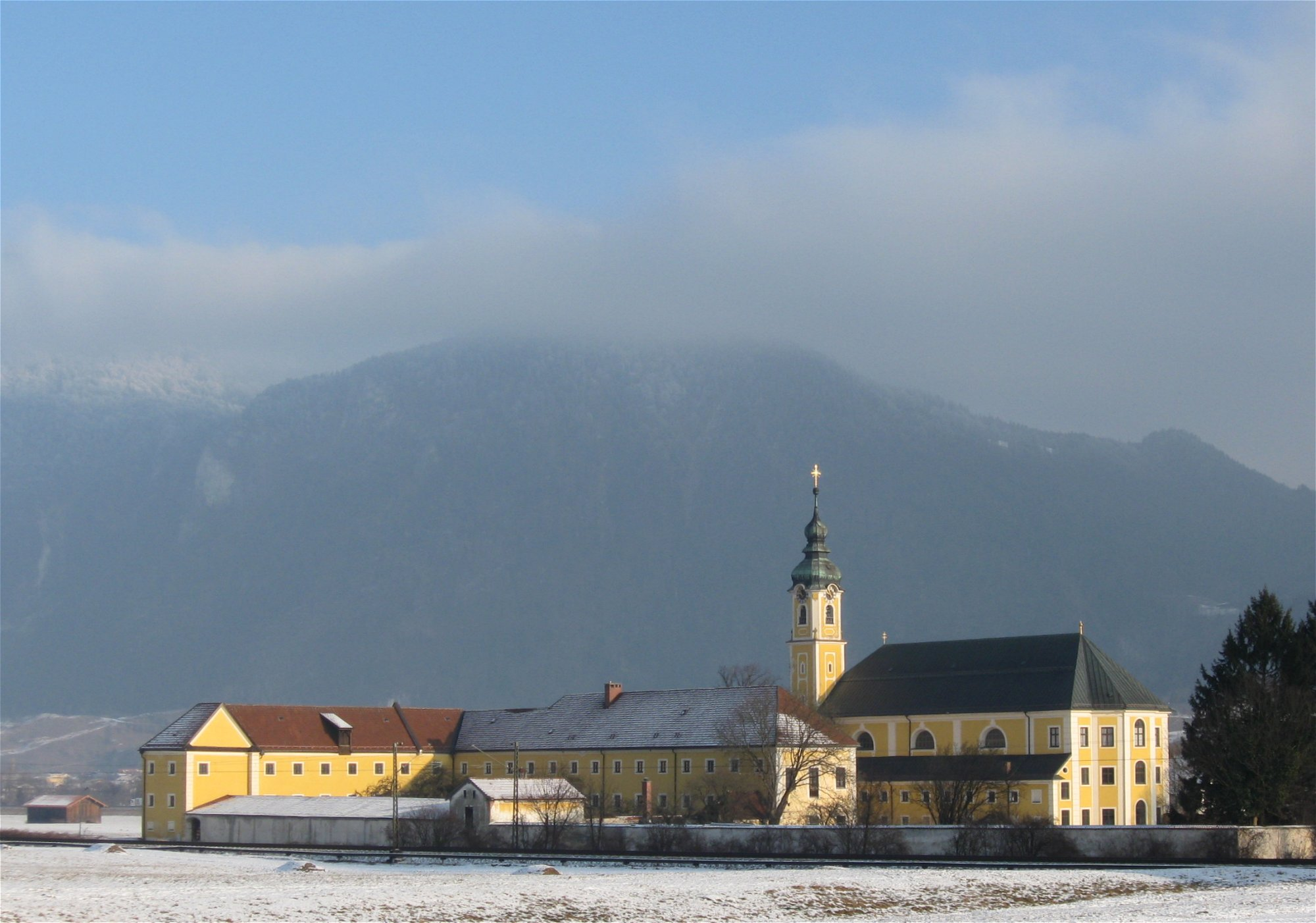

Reisach Priory (German: Kloster Reisach), formerly Urfahrn Priory (German: Kloster Urfahrn), was until 2019 a friary of the Discalced Carmelites in Oberaudorf in Bavaria, Germany, in the diocese of Munich and Freising.

== History ==
=== Urfahrn Priory ===
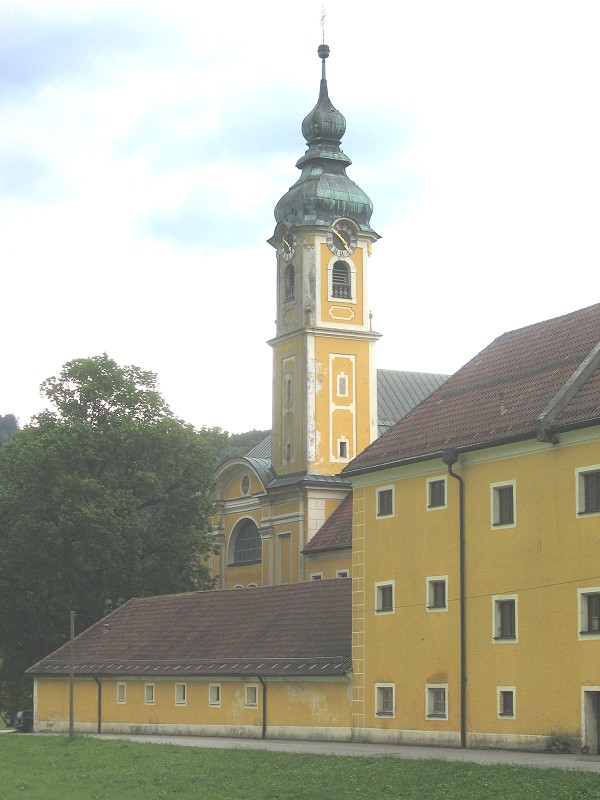

The priory, dedicated to Saint Teresa, was founded as Urfahrn Priory (Kloster Urfahrn) in 1731 for the Discalced Carmelites by Johann Georg von Messerer, a counsellor at the Bavarian court, and his wife, both of whom were members of the Carmelite Third Order. The monastery was built between 1737 and 1741 by Abraham Millauer and his son Philipp to plans by the master builder Johann Baptist Gunetzrhainer. The interior of the church is by the Munich court painter Balthasar Albrecht.

Urfahrn Priory was dissolved in 1802, during the secularisation of Bavaria.

=== Reisach Priory ===
In 1836–37, after failed attempts to establish a Franciscan community in the empty buildings, it was re-founded as Reisach Priory (Kloster Reisach) by a small group of Carmelites from Würzburg.

The monastery was closed in November 2019 and remained empty as at October 2021.

In 2021 most parts of the episode "Wunder gibt es immer wieder" of the detective series Tatort were produced at the empty priory.

== Church ==
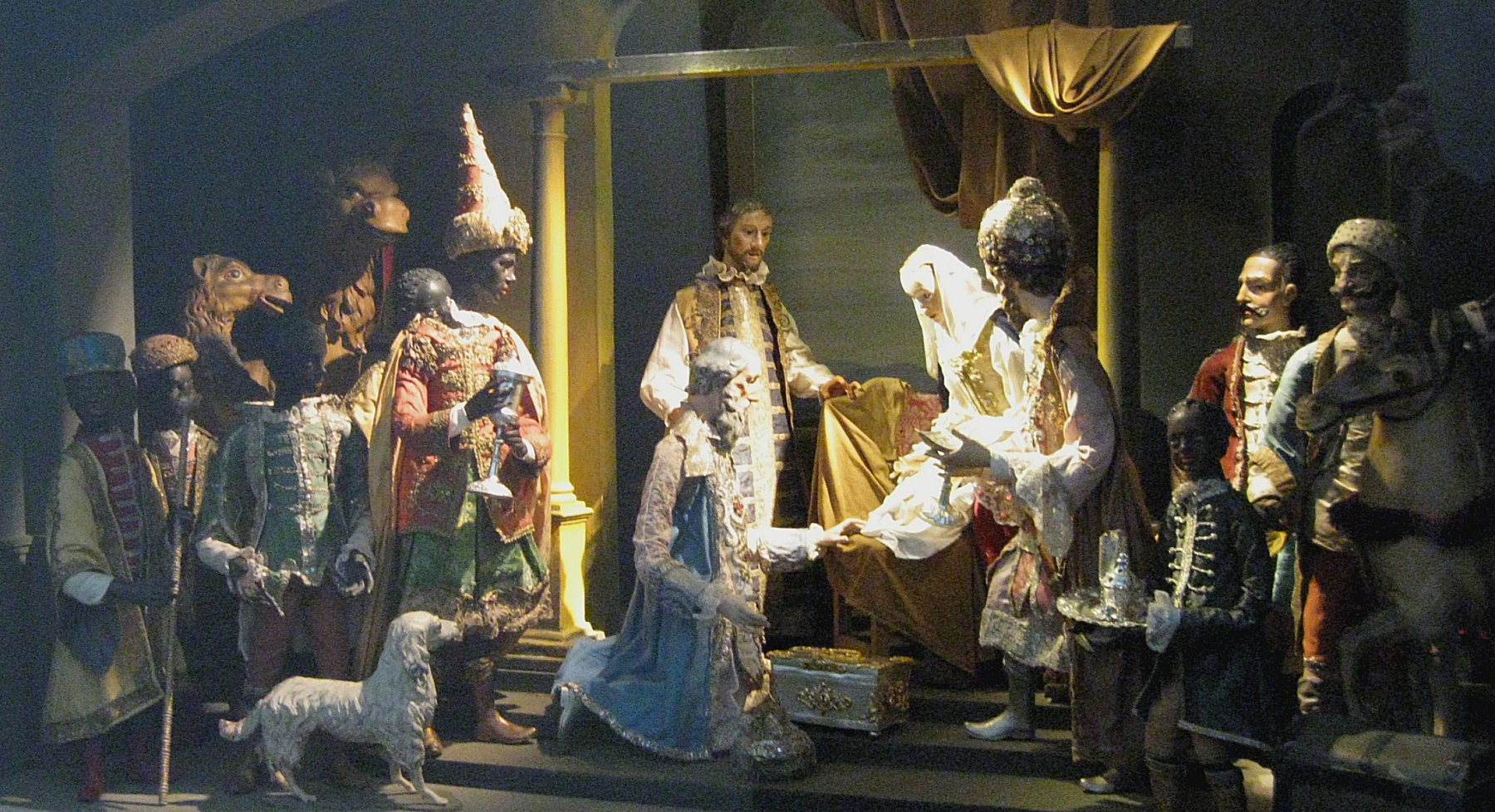
The Baroque crib

The Carmelite church is particularly noted for its carved Baroque crib, created in the second half of the 18th century, and counted as one of the best in Upper Bavaria. The wooden relief carvings on the side altars, including the Altar of the Scapular by Johann Baptist Straub, are also of exceptional quality.

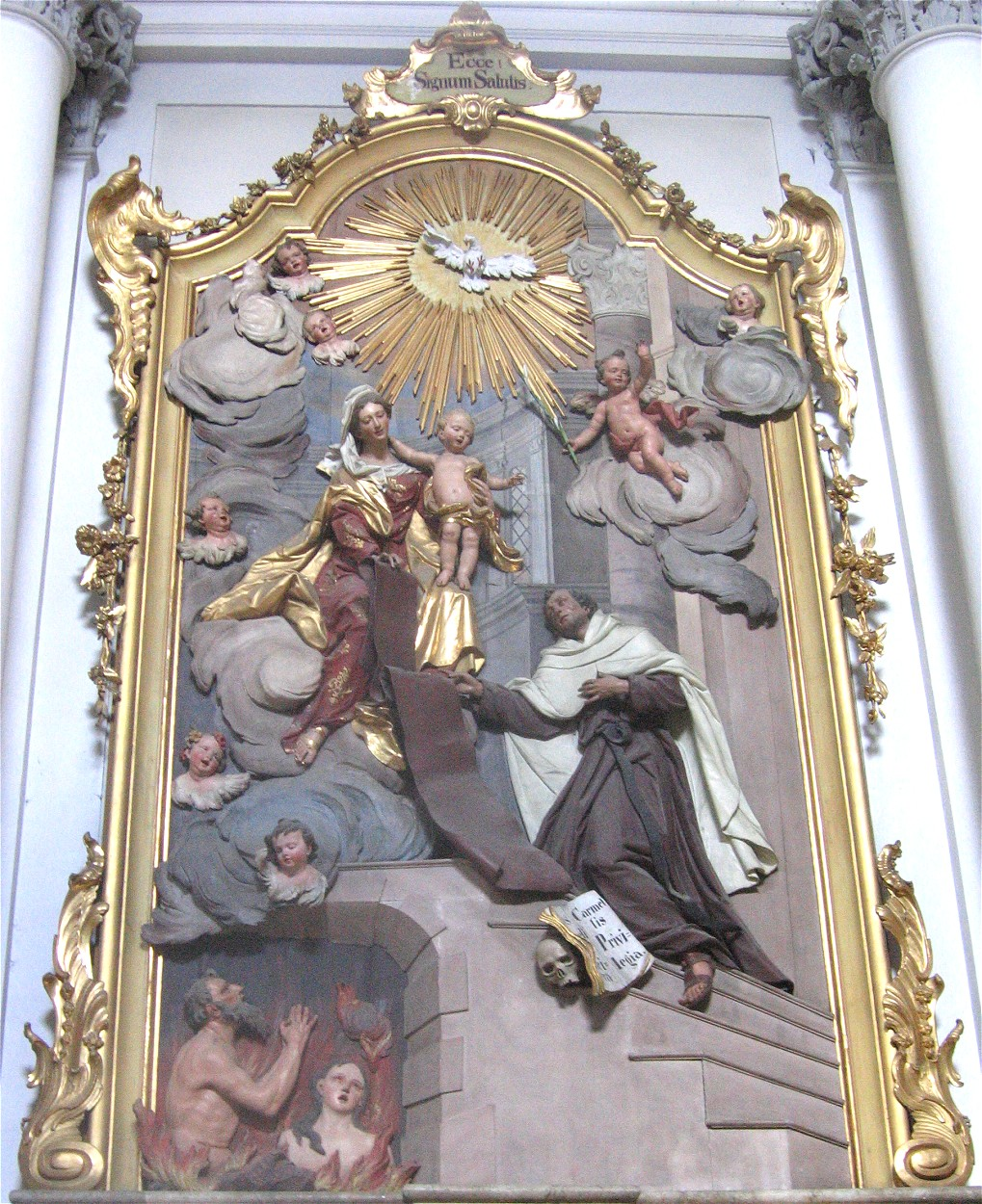
Altar of the Scapular by Johann Baptist Straub
