= Sepp Daxenberger =

German politician (1962–2010)

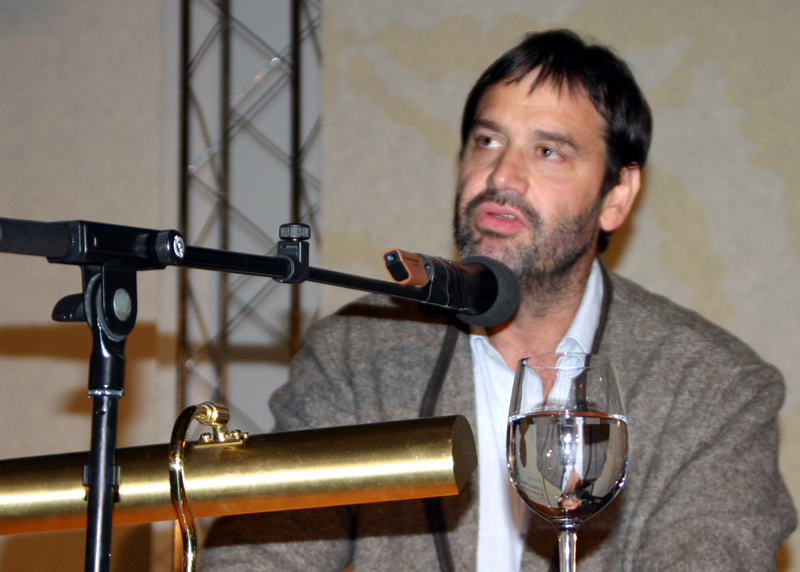
Daxenberger in 2008

Sepp Daxenberger (10 April 1962 – 18 August 2010) was a German politician of the Green Party and organic farmer. He was the first Green mayor to be elected in Bavaria, and served as parliamentary group leader for his party. During his life, he gained recognition for his ability to bridge the political divide between urban and rural communities.

== Early life ==
Daxenberger was born in Waging am See in Bavaria. He became a blacksmith and later he owned and worked at a farm close to Waging.

== Political career ==
In 1990 he was elected as a member of the Landtag of Bavaria, serving until 1996. From 1998 until 2003 he was member of the regional parliament of Upper Bavaria.

In 1996, Daxenberger was elected as mayor of Waging am See – he was the first mayor in Bavaria from the Green Party. Daxenberger was the chairman of the Green Party in Bavaria between 2002 and 2008. For the 2008 Bavaria state election he was nominated as the front-runner of his party and became Parliamentary group leader after the election, in which the Green Party received 7.7% of the vote.

== Personal life and death ==
Daxenberger was diagnosed with cancer in 2003; his condition worsened in 2009. He died of cancer in Traunstein on 18 August 2010. His wife Gertraud, who was also ill with cancer, died of the disease three days before him. They had three sons.
