= Karin Stoiber =

Wife of Edmund Stoiber

Karin Stoiber (née Rudolf; born 6 July 1943 in Buchau, Germany (now Bochov, Czech Republic)) is the wife of Edmund Stoiber, the minister-president of Bavaria from 1993 to 2007 and chairman of the Christian Social Union (CSU). The Stoibers are currently living in Wolfratshausen, Southern Bavaria. They have been married since 23 February 1968. They have three children together. Until the birth of her first daughter in 1971, Karin Stoiber worked as a bank clerk. Her special interest is helping deaf people. She is the patron of the "Kinderhospiz Allgäu" (children's hospice Allgäu).
