= 2008 Bavarian state election =

State election in Bavaria, Germany

- 28 September 2008

All 187 seats in the Landtag of Bavaria 94 seats needed for a majority
- Turnout: 10,612,275 (58.1%) ▲1.0%
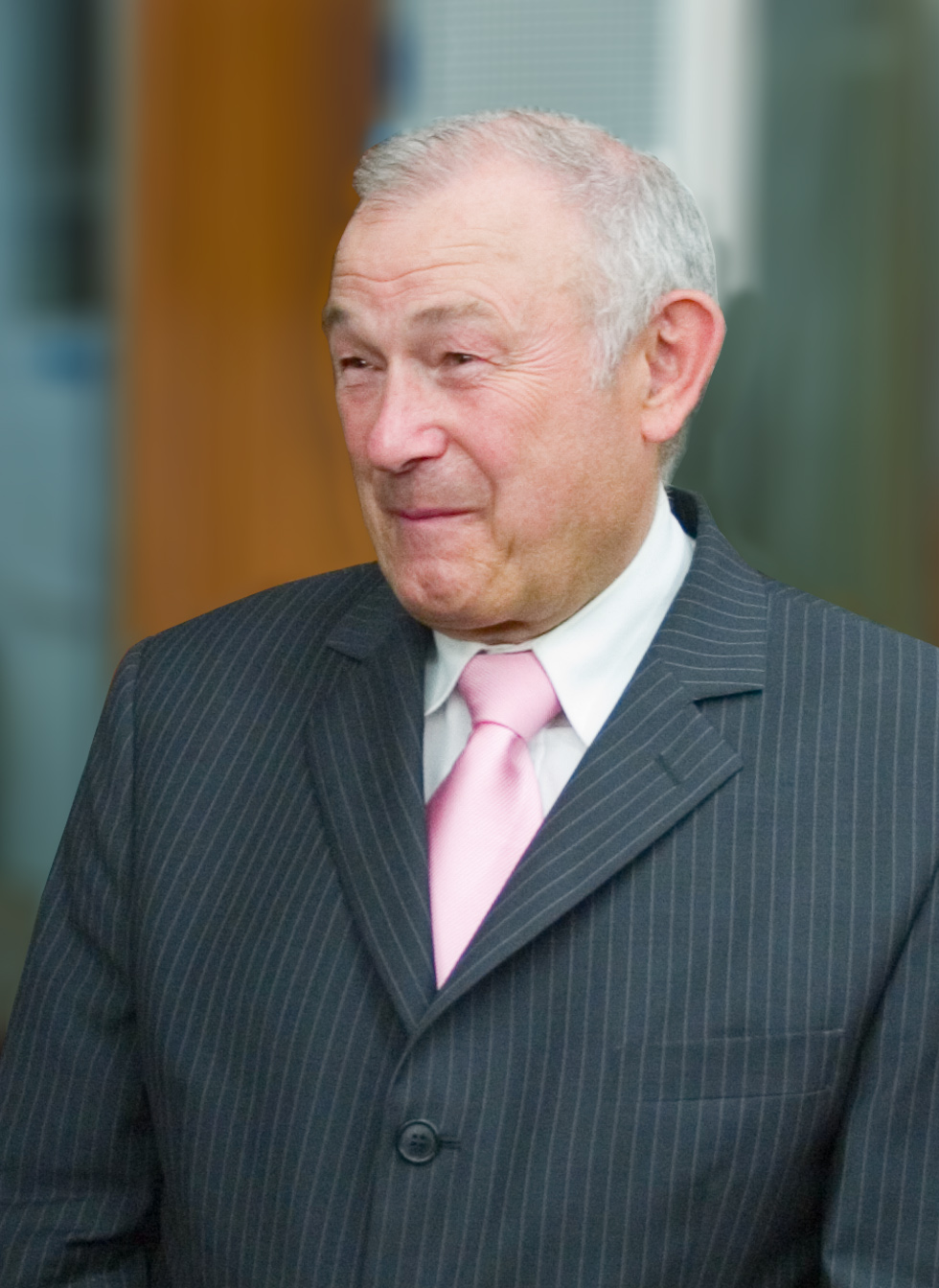

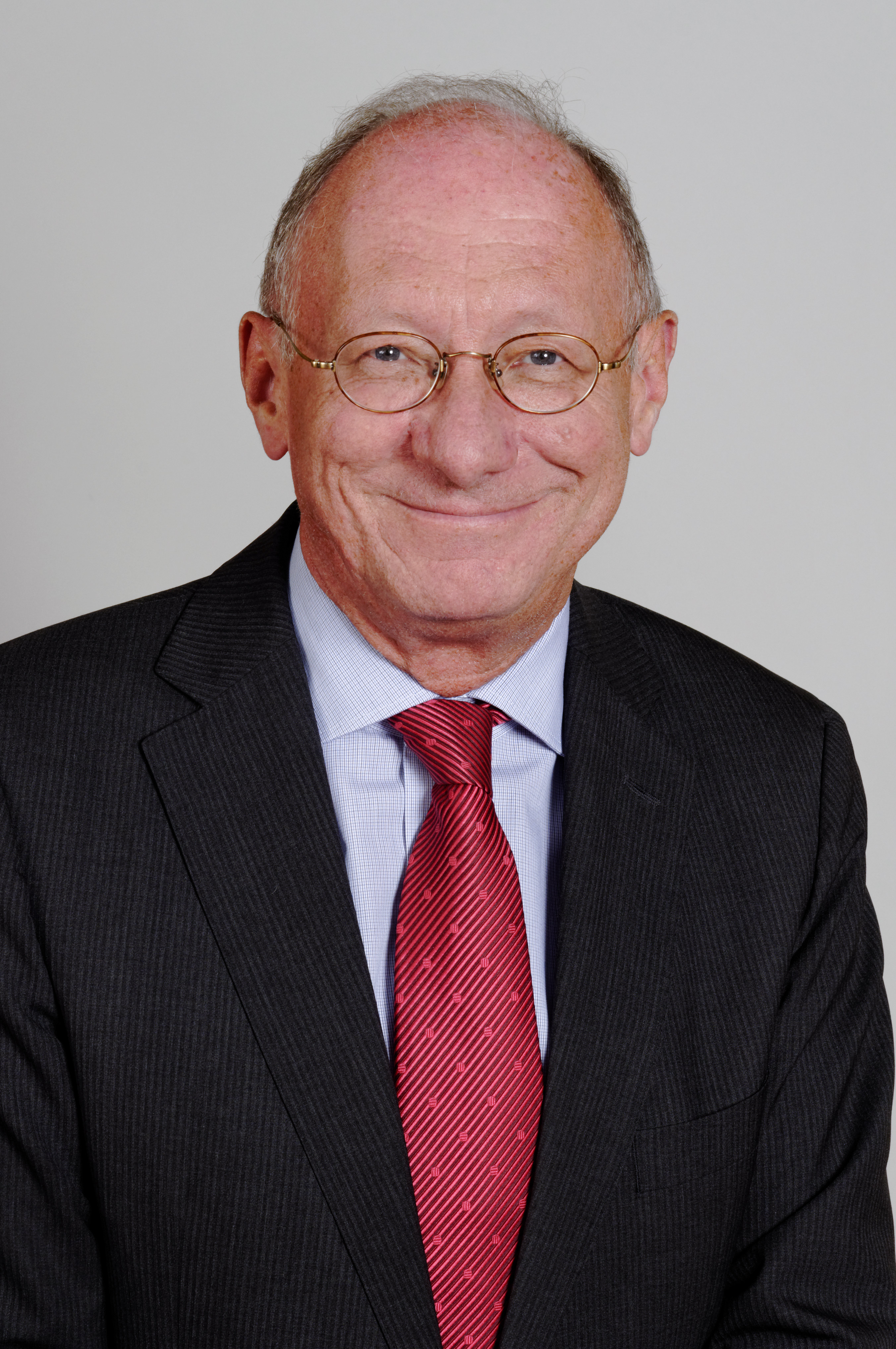

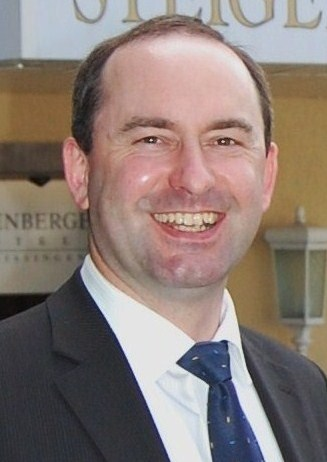

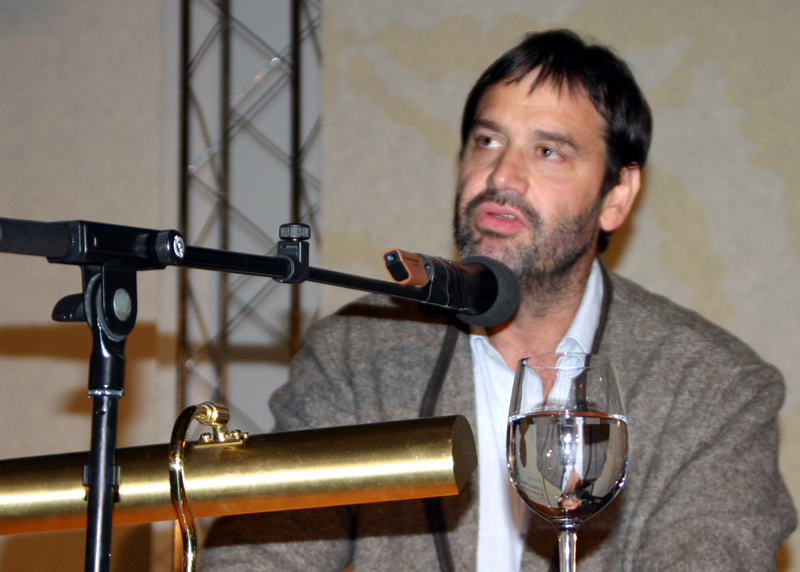

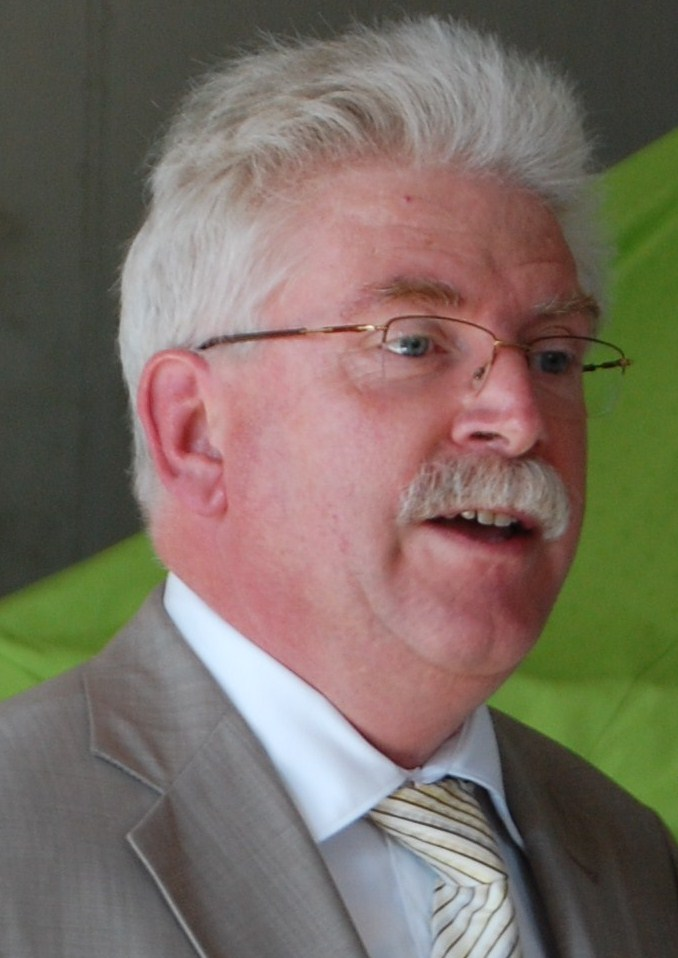
	First party	Second party	Third party
Leader	Günther Beckstein	Franz Maget	Hubert Aiwanger
Party	CSU	SPD	FW
Last election	124 seats, 60.7%	41 seats, 19.6%	0 seats, 4.0%
Seats won	92	39	21
Seat change	▼32	▼2	▲21
Popular vote	4,603,960	1,972,437	1,085,896
Percentage	43.4%	18.6%	10.2%
Swing	▼17.3%	▼1.0%	▲6.2%
	Fourth party	Fifth party
Leader	Sepp Daxenberger	Martin Zeil
Party	Greens	FDP
Last election	15 seats, 7.7%	0 seats, 2.6%
Seats won	19	16
Seat change	▲4	▲16
Popular vote	999,111	847,227
Percentage	9.4%	8.0%
Swing	▲1.7%	▲5.4%
- Results for the single-member constituencies.
Minister-President before election
Günther Beckstein
CSU
Elected Minister-President
Horst Seehofer
CSU

The 2008 Bavarian state election was held on 28 September 2008 to elect the members of the Landtag of Bavaria. The result was a historic defeat for the Christian Social Union (CSU), which had governed with a majority uninterrupted since 1962, and had won over 60% of the vote in the 2003 election. Despite polling suggesting that the party would retain its majority with losses, it suffered a 17% swing and came up two seats short of a majority, its worst result since 1954. Minister-President and CSU leader Günther Beckstein subsequently resigned from both posts, and the Landtag elected Horst Seehofer as his successor after the CSU and Free Democratic Party (FDP) came to a coalition agreement.

The Free Voters of Bavaria entered the Landtag for the first time with 10% of the vote; the FDP also won seats for the first time in 14 years. The Left competed in its first Bavarian election, recording a modest result of 4.3%, but failing to win any seats.

== Parties ==
The table below lists parties represented in the 15th Landtag of Bavaria.

Name		Ideology	Leader(s)	2003 result	
Name		Ideology	Leader(s)	Votes (%)	Seats
CSU	Christian Social Union in Bavaria; Christlich-Soziale Union in Bayern	Christian democracy	Günther Beckstein	60.7%	124 / 180
SPD	Social Democratic Party of Germany; Sozialdemokratische Partei Deutschlands	Social democracy	Franz Maget	19.6%	41 / 180
Grüne	Alliance 90/The Greens; Bündnis 90/Die Grünen	Green politics	Sepp Daxenberger	7.7%	15 / 180

== Opinion polling ==
Polling firm	Fieldwork date	Sample size	CSU	SPD	Grüne	FW	FDP	Linke	ÖDP	Others	Lead
2008 state election	28 Sep 2008	–	43.4	18.6	9.4	10.2	8.0	4.3	2.0	4.1 (Note: 1.4% REP, 2.7% Other)	24.8
GMS	20–21 Sep 2008	1,010	48	19	10	7	7	4	1	4 (Note: 1% Right-wing parties, 3% Other)	29
Emnid	10–18 Sep 2008	1,010	49	20	8	7	8	5	–	3	29
Forschungsgruppe Wahlen	16–18 Sep 2008	1,105	47	20	8	8	9	4	–	4	27
Infratest dimap	15–17 Sep 2008	1,000	47	21	9	7	8	4	–	4	26
Forsa	8–12 Sep 2008	1,101	50	19	9	8	6	4	–	4	31
GMS	6–8 Sep 2008	1,006	49	19	11	5	7	4	2	3 (Note: 1% Right-wing parties, 2% Other)	30
Forschungsgruppe Wahlen	28–30 Jul 2008	1,038	50	20	9	7	6	4	–	4	30
Infratest dimap	24–28 Jul 2008	1,000	48	22	9	5	8	4	–	4	26
Emnid	23 Jun–17 Jul 2008	~500	51	19	9	–	7	5	–	9 (Note: 2% Right-wing parties, 7% Other)	32
TNS Infratest	3–8 Jul 2008	1,000	48	21	11	5	8	4	–	3	27
GMS	8–9 Jul 2008	1,006	50	20	8	4	5	5	2	6 (Note: 2% Right-wing parties, 4% Other)	30
GMS	2–6 Jun 2008	1,009	49	20	9	5	5	5	2	5 (Note: 2% Right-wing parties, 3% Other)	29
Infratest dimap	28–30 Apr 2008	1,000	48	23	10	5	6	4	–	4	25
mifm München	21–23 Apr 2008	1,000	44	20	11	9	9	3	–	4	24
mifm München	4–14 Apr 2008	1,001	40	19	12	11	11	4	–	3	21
GMS	8–14 Apr 2008	1,010	51	20	10	4	6	4	1	4	31
GMS	31 Mar–6 Apr 2008	1,512	50	21	10	4	5	4	–	6	29
Emnid	13–27 Feb 2008	~500	51	19	11	3	6	4	–	6	32
mifm München	31 Jan–7 Feb 2008	1,000	50	20	11	4	7	3	–	5	30
Infratest dimap	3–7 Jan 2008	1,000	52	21	10	2	6	3	–	6	31
Emnid	10 Dec 2007–2 Jan 2008	800	54	20	10	–	6	4	–	6	34
GMS	2–3 Jan 2008	1,004	56	21	9	3	4	3	1	3 (Note: 1% Right-wing parties, 2% Other)	34
GMS	12–17 Dec 2007	1,010	55	20	9	4	5	3	–	4	35
Forsa	5–27 Nov 2007	1,002	56	17	9	3	4	4	–	7	39
mifm München	29 Oct–7 Nov 2007	1,000	53.8	19.1	9.9	1.7	7	3.2	–	5.3	34.7
GMS	21–22 Oct 2007	1,001	54	23	10	3	4	3	1	2 (Note: 1% Right-wing parties, 1% Other)	31
Forschungsgruppe Wahlen	24–26 Sep 2007	1,143	56	22	9	4	4	3	–	2	34
mifm München	7–15 Sep 2007	1,003	53	17	10	3	7	3	1.7	4.9 (Note: 2.3% REP, 1.1% BP, 1.5% Other)	36
Forsa	29 Aug–17 Sep 2007	1,003	57	19	9	2	4	3	–	6	38
Forsa	28–30 Jul 2007	1,002	58	17	9	3	4	3	–	6	41
TNS Infratest	17–19 Jul 2007	1,000	54	22	11	–	5	3	–	5	32
dimap	13–19 Jul 2007	1,000	58	18	11	–	4	4	–	5	40
GMS	13–18 Jun 2007	1,010	54	18	9	4	8	3	–	4	36
Forsa	4–14 Jun 2007	1,001	56	16	9	3	6	3	–	7	40
Forsa	25 Apr–8 May 2007	1,036	56	17	9	3	6	3	–	6	39
Forsa	19 Mar–2 Apr 2007	1,012	54	20	9	3	4	3	–	7	34
Infratest dimap	22–25 Mar 2007	1,002	53	23	10	2	6	2	–	4	30
GMS	5–8 Mar 2007	1,012	53	20	9	4	7	2	1	4 (Note: 1% Right-wing parties, 3% Other)	33
Forsa	15–26 Feb 2007	1,002	53	19	9	3	6	3	–	7	34
GMS	22–25 Jan 2007	1,011	52	22	9	4	7	2	2	2 (Note: 1% Right-wing parties, 1% Other)	30
Infratest dimap	19–20 Jan 2007	1,000	52	24	9	–	7	–	–	8	28
Infratest dimap	15 Jan 2007	1,000	50	24	11	–	8	–	–	7	26
Forsa	10–12 Jan 2007	1,007	49	22	9	3	6	4	–	7	27
Forschungsgruppe Wahlen	12–13 Jan 2007	1,142	45	27	10	–	9	–	–	9	18
Infratest dimap	3–4 Jan 2007	1,000	54	22	9	–	7	–	–	8	32
Forsa	27–29 Dec 2006	1,009	54	18	9	3	5	4	–	7	36
GMS	18–23 Dec 2006	1,006	54	20	10	2	8	2	2	2 (Note: 1% Right-wing parties, 1% Other)	34
Forsa	24 Nov–5 Dec 2006	1,026	56	17	10	2	5	4	–	6	39
Forsa	23 Oct–7 Nov 2006	1,004	54	19	9	2	7	3	–	6	35
GMS	6–8 Oct 2006	1,002	53	22	8	3	8	3	1	2 (Note: 1% Right-wing parties, 1% Other)	31
Forsa	18 Sep–4 Oct 2006	1,006	54	18	9	2	8	3	–	6	36
Infratest dimap	28 Sep–1 Oct 2006	1,000	49	24	10	2	8	1	–	6	25
Forsa	20 Aug–5 Sep 2006	1,005	58	16	10	–	6	3	–	7	42
Forsa	3–12 Jul 2006	1,004	56	16	10	3	6	4	–	5	40
GMS	9–14 Jun 2006	1,002	54	18	11	2.0	8	2.5	–	4.5	36
Forsa	12–17 May 2006	1,002	52	18	9	3	10	3	–	5	34
Emnid	20 Apr–9 May 2006	1,000	53	23	9	–	5	–	–	10	30
Forsa	22–24 Feb 2006	1,003	52	21	9	4	6	3	–	5	31
Infratest dimap	12–15 Jan 2006	1,000	53	22	10	2	7	2 (Note: WASG)	–	4	31
Forsa	4–11 Jan 2006	1,114	49	24	10	–	6	3 (Note: WASG)	–	8 (Note: 3% Right-wing parties, 5% Other)	25
Peinelt	17 Nov–9 Dec 2005	1,067	45.9	21.5	8.6	4.2	11.8	–	–	8.0 (Note: 4.3% REP, 3.7% Other)	24.4
GMS	17–21 Dec 2005	1,001	56	22	7	4	4	2	1	4 (Note: 2% Right-wing parties, 2% Other)	34
Infratest dimap	15–16 Nov 2005	1,000	45	24	10	–	11	3	–	7	21
Forsa	4–7 Nov 2005	1,001	49	21	9	–	9	4	–	8 (Note: 3% Right-wing parties, 5% Other)	28
Infratest dimap	21–24 Jul 2005	1,000	59	18	9	–	4	4	–	6	41
Infratest dimap	5–9 Jan 2005	1,000	56	22	10	–	5	–	–	7	34
Infratest dimap	21–25 Jul 2004	1,000	58	17	12	–	5	–	–	8	41
GMS	17–20 Mar 2004	1,009	61.0	19.0	10.0	1.5	3.0	0.5	2.0	3.0 (Note: 1.0% REP, 2.0% Other)	42
Infratest dimap	2–5 Jan 2004	1,000	62	19	9	–	3	–	–	7	43
2003 state election	21 Sep 2003	–	60.7	19.6	7.7	4.0	2.6	–	2.0	3.4 (Note: 2.2% REP, 1.2% Other)	41.1

== Election result ==
Party	Votes	%	+/–	Seats	+/–
Christian Social Union (CSU)	4,603,960	43.38	-17.3	92	-32
Social Democratic Party (SPD)	1,972,437	18.59	-1.0	39	-2
Free Voters of Bavaria (FW)	1,085,896	10.23	+6.2	21	+21
Alliance 90/The Greens (Grüne)	999,111	9.41	+1.7	19	+4
Free Democratic Party (FDP)	847,227	7.98	+5.4	16	+16
The Left (Linke)	461,755	4.35	New	0	New
Ecological Democratic Party (ÖDP)	212,200	2.00	–	0	±0
The Republicans (REP)	146,073	1.38	-0.9	0	±0
National Democratic Party (NPD)	123,399	1.16	+1.2	0	±0
Bavaria Party (BP)	116,464	1.10	+0.3	0	±0
Pensioners' Party (RRP)	19,760	0.19	New	0	New
The Violets (Violetten)	15,465	0.15	New	0	New
Citizens' Bloc (BB)	7,306	0.07	–	0	±0
Civil Rights Movement Solidarity (BüSo)	1,222	0.01	-0.1	0	±0
Total	10,612,275	100.00	–	187	–

Popular vote
CSU	43.38%
SPD	18.59%
FW	10.23%
B'90/GRÜNE	9.41%
FDP	7.98%
DIE LINKE	4.35%
Other	6.06%

Landtag seats
CSU	49.19%
SPD	20.86%
FW	11.23%
B'90/GRÜNE	10.16%
FDP	8.56%

== See also ==
- 2003 Bavaria state election
