= Günther Beckstein =

German politician

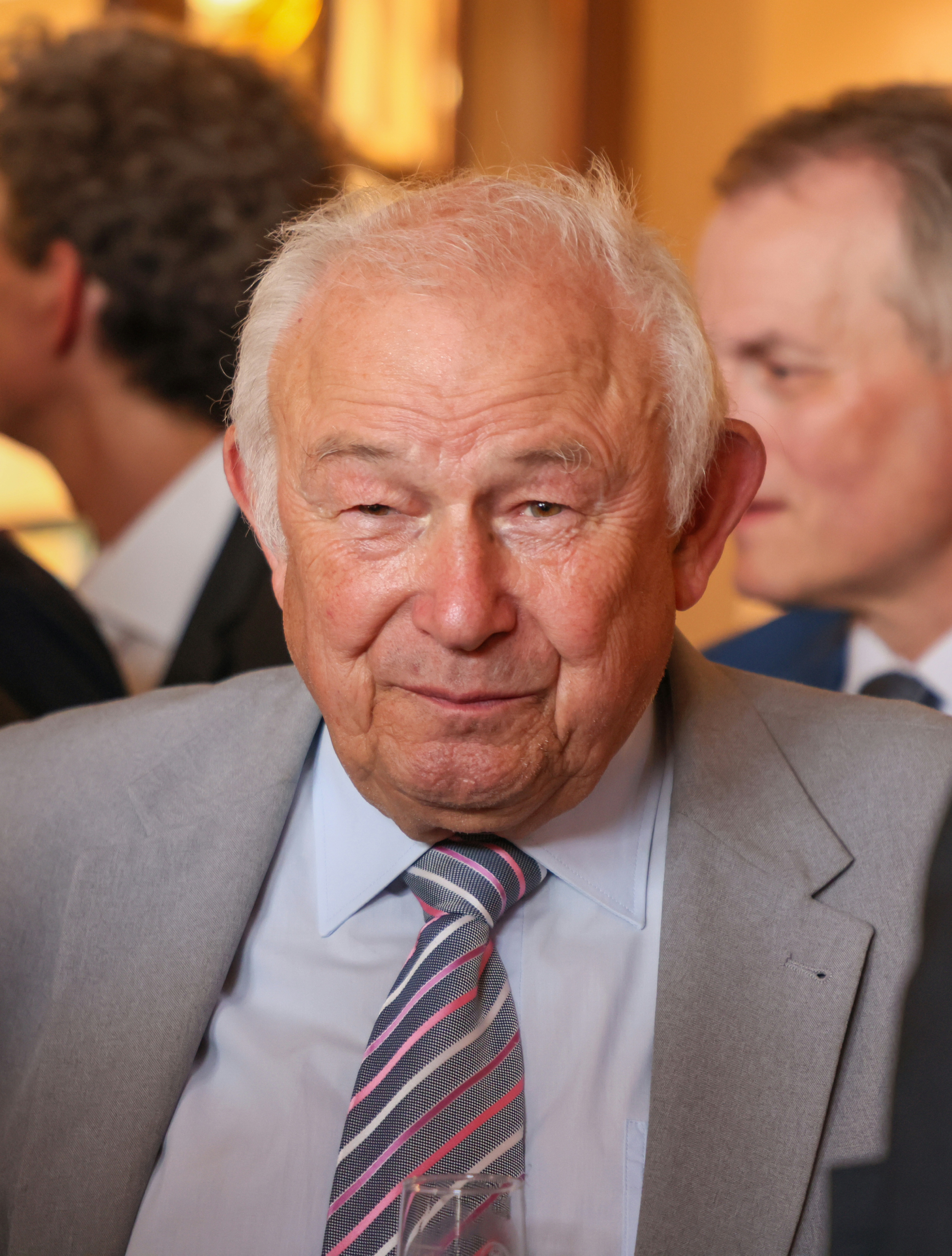
- Beckstein in 2023

Minister-President of Bavaria
- In office 9 October 2007 – 27 October 2008
- Deputy: Christa Stewens
- Preceded by: Edmund Stoiber
- Succeeded by: Horst Seehofer

Deputy Minister-President of Bavaria
- In office 29 January 2001 – 9 October 2007
- Minister-President: Edmund Stoiber
- Preceded by: Barbara Stamm
- Succeeded by: Martin Zeil

Minister of the Interior of Bavaria
- In office 17 June 1993 – 9 October 2007
- Minister-President: Edmund Stoiber
- Preceded by: Edmund Stoiber
- Succeeded by: Joachim Herrmann

Member of the Landtag of Bavaria
- In office 12 November 1974 – 8 October 2013
- Constituency: Middle Franconia (1974–1986); Nuremberg North (1986–1994); Middle Franconia (1994–2003); Nuremberg North (2003–2013)

Member of the Bundestag; from Bavaria
- In office 18 October 2005 – 23 November 2005
- Preceded by: Multi-member district
- Succeeded by: Dorothee Bär
- Constituency: Sate list

Personal details
- Born: 23 November 1943 (age 82) Hersbruck, Germany
- Party: Christian Social Union
- Spouse: Marga Weber (m. 1973)
- Children: 3
- Education: University of Erlangen–Nuremberg; LMU Munich
- Profession: Lawyer

Günther Beckstein (German pronunciation: [ˈɡʏntɐ ˈbɛkʃtaɪn]; born 23 November 1943) is a German CSU politician from Bavaria and was the 17th minister-president of Bavaria from 9 October 2007 to 27 October 2008. He is well known for his outspoken views on law and order.

== Early life and education ==
Beckstein was born in Hersbruck. After graduating from High School at the Willstätter-Gymnasium in Nuremberg in 1962, he studied law at the University of Erlangen–Nuremberg and LMU Munich. He holds a Ph.D. from the University of Erlangen–Nuremberg. In 1975, he wrote his dissertation Der Gewissenstäter im Strafrecht und Strafprozessrecht (The Delinquent of Conscience in Criminal Law and Trial Law). Between 1971 and 1978, he worked as a lawyer.

== Political career ==
Beckstein started his political career as the district chairman of the Junge Union Nuremberg-Fürth (1973–1978) and then became vice chairman of the CSU district association Nürnberg-Fürth-Schwabach. In 1991, he acceded its chairmanship.

Beckstein became a member of the Bavarian State Parliament, the Landtag, for the CSU in 1974. In 1987, he ran for Oberbürgermeister (Lord Mayor) of his home town Nuremberg, but lost to his opponent Peter Schönlein (SPD). In 1988, Beckstein became State Secretary at the Bavarian Ministry of Interior (Bayerisches Staatsministerium des Innern). In 1993, he became the Interior Minister of Bavaria, succeeding Edmund Stoiber. In 2001, he was elected to the post of Deputy Minister-President of Bavaria.

Beckstein won seat in the Bundestag in the 2005 German federal elections but did not take up this position, preferring to stay in state politics.

After Minister-President Edmund Stoiber had announced on 18 January 2007 to resign from his post in the autumn of 2007, the CSU Landtag fraction came to the arrangement for Beckstein to succeed Stoiber, after a power struggle with Erwin Huber, selecting him with a vast majority. On 9 October, the Bavarian Landtag elected him as the new Minister-President by a majority of 122 of the 178 votes cast.

His rise to the post of Bavarian prime minister was something of a novelty in the state as he is from Franconia—the northern half of Bavaria—and a Protestant. Traditionally, though not exclusively, Bavarian prime ministers have been from Altbayern—the south—and Catholics.

On 1 October 2008, following the Bavarian state elections of 28 September, where his party lost its absolute majority of the seats for the first time in 46 years, Beckstein resigned from his post but remained in office until a new Minister-President was elected on 27 October.

Beckstein was a CSU delegate to the Federal Convention for the purpose of electing the President of Germany in 2017.

== Political positions ==
- Beckstein is an outspoken critic of the Church of Scientology.
- He is a staunch supporter of Israel and has warned in the past of the danger of right-wing extremism and antisemitism. He has received the Jerusalem Prize of the Zionistische Organisation in Deutschland (Zionistin Organisation of Germany) in July 2006 for his efforts.
- He has warned repeatedly of the dangers arising from Islamist extremists in Germany and has asked for greater powers for government security departments to deal with those. He was criticized for this by members of the SPD and German Muslims.
- As the head of the Bavarian government, Beckstein had the final say on whether Hitler's Mein Kampf could be published in Germany, since Bavaria holds the copyrights. Beckstein disallowed any form of publication of the book in Germany, fearing it would fuel right-wing extremism.
- Beckstein caused controversy in the run-up to Oktoberfest by declaring that people who drink two Maß of beer over several hours are fit to drive.

== Other activities ==
- Deutsche Bank, Member of the Regional Advisory Board for Bavaria (since 2011)
- University of Erlangen-Nuremberg (FAU), Member of the Board of Trustees

== Personal life ==
Beckstein has been married to Marga Beckstein, a teacher, since 1973. They have three children: Ruth, Frank and Martin. Beckstein and his wife are residents of Nuremberg-Langwasser. He is a Protestant and an active church member, who was a member of the synod of the Evangelical Church in Germany from 1993 to 2015.

Political offices
Preceded by Edmund Stoiber	Minister president of Bavaria; 2007–2008	Succeeded by Horst Seehofer
