= Edmund Stoiber =

German politician (born 1941)

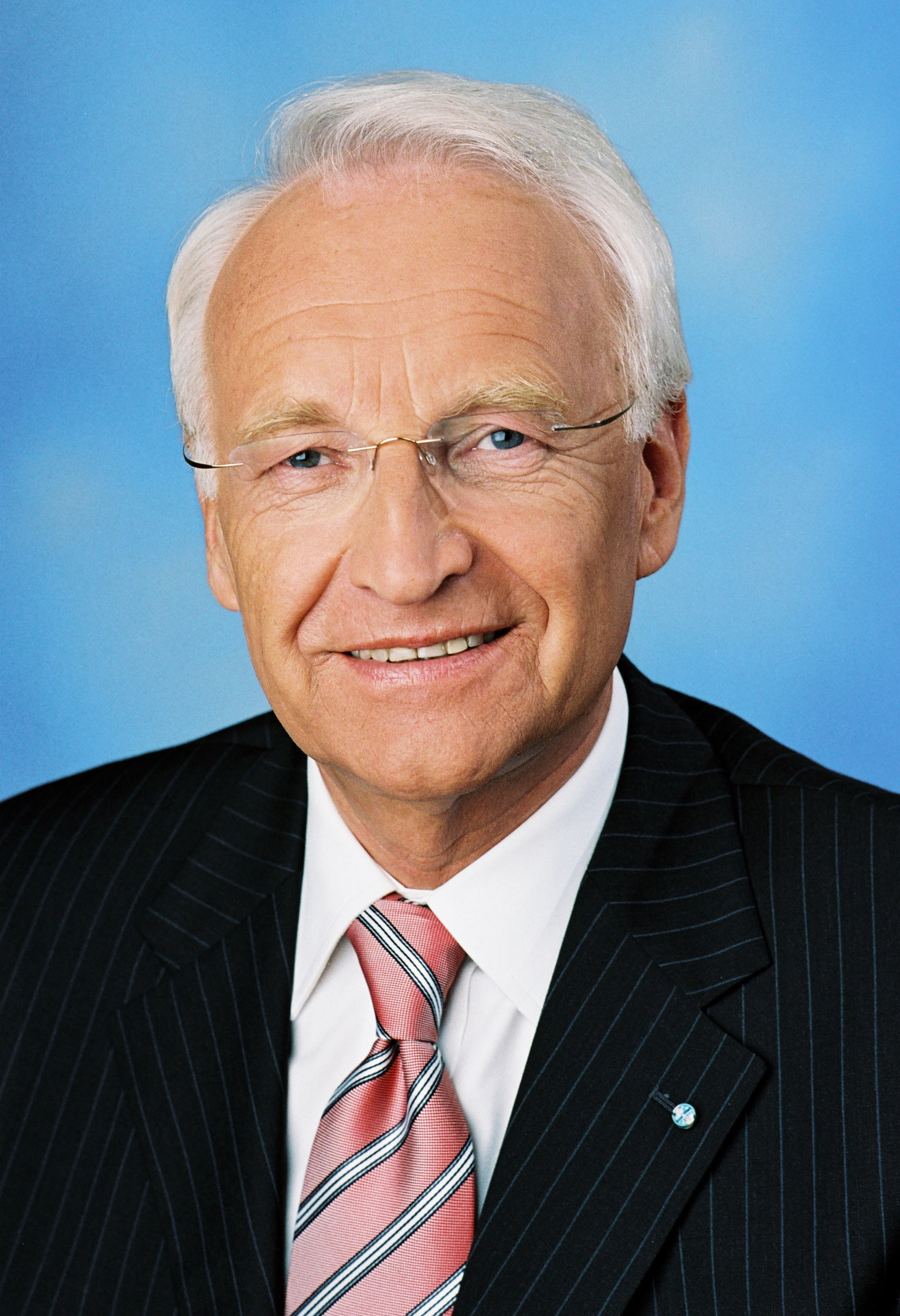
- Stoiber in 2010

Leader of the Christian Social Union
- In office 9 October 1999 – 18 September 2007
- General Secretary: Thomas Goppel; Markus Söder
- Preceded by: Theo Waigel
- Succeeded by: Erwin Huber

Minister-President of Bavaria
- In office 28 May 1993 – 30 September 2007
- Deputy: Hans Zehetmair; Barbara Stamm; Günther Beckstein
- Preceded by: Max Streibl
- Succeeded by: Günther Beckstein

President of the Bundesrat
- In office 1 November 1995 – 31 October 1996
- First Vice President: Johannes Rau
- Preceded by: Johannes Rau
- Succeeded by: Erwin Teufel

State Minister of the Interior of Bavaria
- In office 19 October 1988 – 17 June 1993
- Minister-President: Max Streibl
- Preceded by: August Richard Lang
- Succeeded by: Günther Beckstein

State Minister and Chief of the State Chancellery of Bavaria (Note: State Secretary from 1982 to 1986.)
- In office 27 October 1982 – 19 October 1988
- Minister-President: Franz Josef Strauß
- Preceded by: Rainer Keßler
- Succeeded by: Wilhelm Vorndran

Member of the Landtag of Bavaria for Bad Tölz-Wolfratshausen, Garmisch-Partenkirchen (Bad Tölz-Wolfratshausen; 1994–2003) (Miesbach; 1974–1994)
- In office 12 November 1974 – 17 July 2008
- Preceded by: Anton Staudacher
- Succeeded by: Martin Bachhuber

Personal details
- Born: 28 September 1941 (age 85) Oberaudorf, Bavaria, Germany
- Party: Christian Social Union (1971–)
- Spouse: Karin Stoiber (m. 1968)
- Children: 3
- Education: Bavarian School of Public Policy; LMU Munich; University of Regensburg (Dr. iur.)
- Website: stoiber.de

Edmund Rüdiger Stoiber (born 28 September 1941) is a German politician who served as the 16th minister-president of the state of Bavaria between 1993 and 2007 and chairman of the Christian Social Union (CSU) between 1999 and 2007. In 2002, he ran for the office of Chancellor of Germany in the federal election, and in one of the narrowest elections in German history lost against Gerhard Schröder. On 18 January 2007, he announced that he would step down as minister-president and as party chairman by 30 September, after having been under fire in his own party for weeks.

== Early life ==
Stoiber was born in Oberaudorf in the district of Rosenheim in Bavaria. Prior to entering politics in 1974 and serving in the Bavarian Parliament, he was a lawyer and worked at the University of Regensburg.

== Education and profession ==
Stoiber attended the Ignaz-Günther-Gymnasium in Rosenheim, where he received his Abitur (high school diploma) in 1961, although he had to repeat one year for failing Latin. His military service was with the 1st Gebirgsdivision (mountain infantry division) in Mittenwald and Bad Reichenhall and was cut short due to a knee injury. Stoiber then studied political science and (from the fall of 1962) law at LMU Munich. In 1967, he passed the state law exam and then worked at the University of Regensburg in criminal law and Eastern European law. He received a doctorate in jurisprudence, and then in 1971 passed the second state examination with distinction.

In 1971, Stoiber joined the Bavarian State Ministry of Development and Environment.

== Political career ==
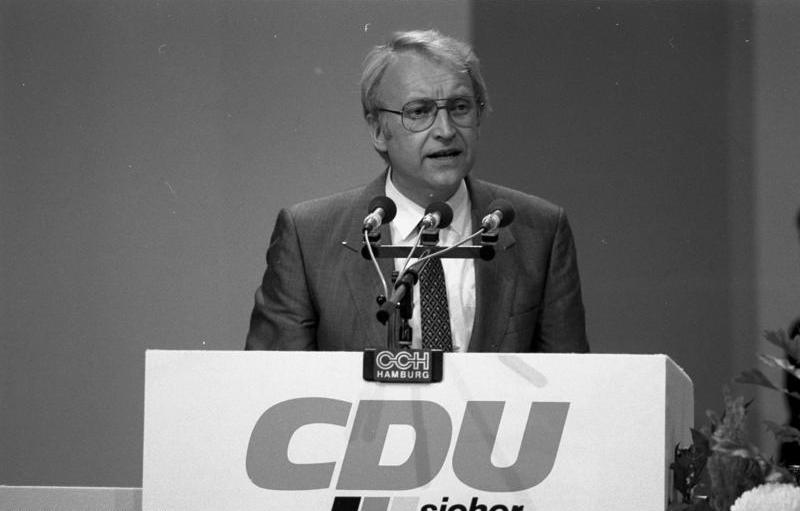
Stoiber in 1981

In 1978, Stoiber was elected secretary general of the CSU, a post he held until 1982/83. In this capacity, he served as campaign manager of Franz-Josef Strauss, the first Bavarian leader to run for the chancellorship, in the 1980 national elections. From 1982 to 1986 he served as deputy to the Bavarian secretary of the state and then, in the position of State Minister, led the State Chancellery from 1982 to 1988. From 1988 to 1993 he served as State Minister of the Interior.

=== Minister-President of Bavaria, 1993–2007 ===
In May 1993, the Landtag of Bavaria, the state's parliament, elected Stoiber as Minister-President succeeding Max Streibl. He came to power amid a political crisis involving a sex scandal, surrounding a contender for the state premiership. Upon taking office, he nominated Strauss' daughter Monika Hohlmeier as State Minister for Education and Cultural Affairs.

In his capacity as Minister-President, Stoiber served as President of the Bundesrat in 1995/96. In 1998, he also succeeded Theo Waigel as chairman of the CSU.

During Stoiber's 14 years leading Bavaria, the state solidified its position as one of Germany's richest. Already by 1998, under his leadership, the state had privatized more than $3 billion worth of state-owned businesses and used that money to invest in new infrastructure and provide venture capital for new companies. He was widely regarded a central figure in building one of Europe's most powerful regional economies, attracting thousands of hi-tech, engineering and media companies and reducing unemployment to half the national average.

=== Candidate for Chancellor, 2002 ===
In 2002, Stoiber politically outmaneuvered CDU chairwoman, Angela Merkel, and was declared the CDU/CSU's candidate for the office of chancellor by practically the entire leadership of the CSU's sister party CDU, challenging Gerhard Schröder. At that time, Merkel had generally been seen as a transitional chair and was strongly opposed by the CDU's male leaders, often called the party's "crown princess".

In the run up to the 2002 national elections, the CSU/CDU held a huge lead in the opinion polls and Stoiber famously remarked that "... this election is like a football match where it's the second half and my team is ahead by 2–0." However, on election day things had changed. The SPD had mounted a huge comeback, and the CDU/CSU was narrowly defeated (though both the SPD and CDU/CSU had 38.5% of the vote, the SPD was ahead by a small 6,000 vote margin, winning 251 seats to the CDU/CSU's 248). The election was one of modern Germany's closest votes.

Gerhard Schröder was re-elected as chancellor by the parliament in a coalition with the Greens, who had increased their vote share marginally. Many commentators faulted Stoiber's reaction to the floods in eastern Germany, in the run-up to the election, as a contributory factor in his party's poor electoral result and defeat. In addition, Schröder distinguished himself from his opponent by taking an active stance against the upcoming United States-led Iraq War. His extensive campaigning on this stance was widely seen as swinging the election to the SPD in the weeks running up to the election.

=== Later political career ===
Stoiber subsequently led the CSU to an absolute majority in the 2003 Bavarian state elections, for the third time in a row, winning this time 60.7% of the votes and a two-thirds majority in the Landtag. This was the widest margin ever achieved by a German party in any state.

Between 2003 and 2004, Stoiber served as co-chair (alongside Franz Müntefering) of the First Commission on the modernization of the federal state (Föderalismuskommission I), which had been established to reform the division of powers between federal and state authorities in Germany. In February 2004, he became a candidate of Jacques Chirac and Gerhard Schröder for the presidency of the European Commission but he decided not to run for this office.

Stoiber had ambitions to run again for the chancellorship, but Merkel secured the nomination, and in November 2005 she won the general election. He was slated to join Merkel's first grand coalition cabinet as Economics minister. However, on 1 November 2005, he announced his decision to stay in Bavaria, due to personnel changes on the SPD side of the coalition (Franz Müntefering resigned as SPD chairman) and an unsatisfactory apportionment of competences between himself and designated Science minister Annette Schavan. Stoiber also resigned his seat in the 16th Bundestag, being a member from 18 October to 8 November.

Subsequently, criticism grew in the CSU, where other politicians had to scale back their ambitions after Stoiber's decision to stay in Bavaria. On 18 January 2007, he announced his decision to stand down from the posts of minister-president and party chairman by 30 September. Günther Beckstein, then Bavarian state minister of the interior, succeeded him as minister-president and Erwin Huber as party chairman, defeating Horst Seehofer at a convention at 18 September 2007 with 58,1% of the votes. Both Beckstein and Huber resigned after the 2008 state elections, in which the CSU vote dropped to 43,4% and the party had to form a coalition with another party for the first time since 1966.

== Life after politics ==
Stoiber was first appointed in 2007 as a special adviser to European Commission President José Manuel Barroso to chair the "High level group on administrative burdens", made up of national experts, NGOs, business and industry organizations. Quickly nicknamed the "Stoiber Group", it produced a report in July 2014 with several proposals on streamlining the regulatory process. Stoiber was re-appointed in December 2014 by Jean-Claude Juncker to the same role, from which he resigned after one year in late 2015.

Since his retirement from German politics in 2007, Stoiber has worked as a lawyer and held paid and unpaid positions, including:

- Bundesliga Foundation, Member of the Board of Trustees
- Commerzbank, Member of the Central Advisory Board
- Deloitte Germany, chairman of the Advisory Board (since 2009)
- Donner & Reuschel, Member of the Advisory Board
- FC Bayern Munich, Member of the Supervisory Board of the stock corporation and Chairman of the Advisory Board of the club.
- German-Russian Raw Materials Forum, Member of the Presidium
- Hanns Seidel Foundation, Member
- Lindau Nobel Laureate Meetings, Member of the Honorary Senate
- LMU Munich, Member of the Board of Trustees
- Munich Security Conference, Member of the Advisory Council
- Nürnberger Beteiligungs-Aktiengesellschaft, Member of the Supervisory Board
- ProSiebenSat.1 Media, Member of the advisory board (since 2011)

Stoiber was a CSU delegate to the Federal Convention for the purpose of electing the President of Germany in 2017.

== Political positions ==
=== Foreign policy ===
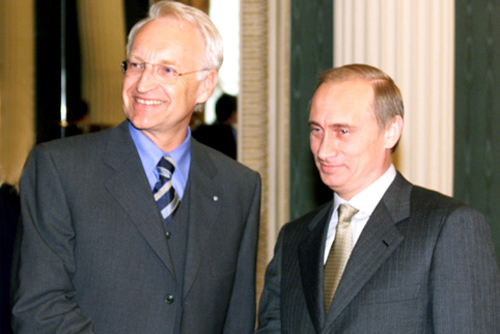
Stoiber and Vladimir Putin in 2000

In his capacity as Minister-President, Stoiber made 58 foreign trips, including to China (1995, 2003), Israel (2001), Egypt (2001), India (2004, 2007) and South Korea (2007).

In 2002, Stoiber publicly expressed support for the United States in their policy toward Iraq. During his election campaign, he made clear his opposition to war, and his support for the introduction of weapons inspectors to Iraq without preconditions as a way of avoiding war, and he criticized Schröder for harming the German-American alliance by not calling President George W. Bush and discussing the issue privately. He also attacked German Foreign Minister Joschka Fischer for his criticism of the U.S. position.

Stoiber is known for backing Vladimir Putin and there have been comparisons to Gerhard Schröder. One author called Stoiber a "Moscow's Trojan Horse". Putin is known to have given Stoiber "extreme forms of flattery" and privileges such as a private dinner at Putin's residence outside Moscow.

=== European integration ===
Stoiber has been said to be skeptical of Germany's decision to adopt the euro. In 1997, he joined the minister-presidents of two other German states, Kurt Biedenkopf and Gerhard Schröder, in making the case for a five-year delay in Europe's currency union. When the European Commission recommended that Greece be allowed to join the eurozone in 1998, he demanded that the country be barred from adopting the common currency for several years instead. He is a staunch opponent of Turkey's integration into the European Union, claiming that its non-Christian culture would dilute the Union.

At the same time, Stoiber has repeatedly insisted he is a "good European" who is keen, for instance, on forging an EU-wide foreign policy, replete with a single European army. Earlier, in 1993, he had told German newspapers: "I want a simple confederation. That means the nation-states maintain their dominant role, at least as far as internal matters are concerned."

=== Economic policy ===
While the conservative wing of the German political spectrum, primarily formed of the CDU and CSU, enjoys considerable support, this support tends to be less extended to Stoiber. He enjoys considerably more support in his home state of Bavaria than in the rest of Germany, where CDU chairwoman Angela Merkel is more popular. This has its reasons: Merkel supports a kind of fiscal conservatism, but a more liberal social policy. Stoiber, on the other hand, favors a more conservative approach to both fiscal and social matters, and while this ensures him the religious vote, strongest in Bavaria, it has weakened his support at the national level.

In 2005, Stoiber successfully lobbied Novartis, the Swiss pharmaceuticals group, to move the headquarters of its Sandoz subsidiary to Munich, making it one of Europe's highest-profile corporate relocations that year as well as a significant boost to Stoiber's attempts to build up Bavaria as a pharmaceuticals and biotechnology center.

During his time as Minister-President of Bavaria, Stoiber pushed for the construction of a roughly 40-kilometer high-speed magnetic-levitation link from Munich's main station to its airport, to be built by Transrapid International, a consortium including ThyssenKrupp and Munich-based Siemens. After he left office, the German federal government abandoned the plans in 2008 because of spiraling costs of as much as €3.4 billion.

=== Domestic policy ===
Stoiber, as a minister in the state of Bavaria, was widely known for advocating a reduction in the number of asylum seekers Germany accepts, something that prompted critics to label him xenophobic, anti-Turkish and anti-Islam. In the late 1990s, he criticized the incoming Chancellor Gerhard Schröder for saying that he would work hard in the interest of Germans and people living in Germany. Stoiber's remarks drew heavy criticism in the press.

When Germany's Federal Constitutional Court decided in 1995 that a Bavarian law requiring a crucifix to be hung in each of the state's 40,000 classrooms was unconstitutional, Stoiber said he would not order the removal of crucifixes "for the time being", and asserted that he was under no obligation to remove them in schools where parents unanimously opposed such action.

During his 2002 election campaign, Stoiber indicated he would not ban same-sex marriages—sanctioned by the Schröder government—a policy he had vehemently objected to when it was introduced.

=== Media policy ===
Stoiber has been a staunch advocate of changes in German law that would give more power to owners of private TV channels. In 1995, he publicly called for the abolition of Germany's public television service ARD and a streamlining of its regional services, adding that he and Minister-President Kurt Biedenkopf of Saxony would break the contract ARD has with regional governments if reforms were not undertaken. However, when European Commissioner for Competition Karel van Miert unveiled ideas for reforming the rules governing the financing of public service broadcasters in 1998, Stoiber led the way in rejecting moves to reform established practice.

== Controversies ==
=== Comments on East Germany ===
During the run-up to the German general election in 2005, which was held ahead of schedule, Stoiber created controversy through a campaign speech held in the beginning of August 2005 in the federal state of Baden-Württemberg. He said, "I do not accept that the East [of Germany] will again decide who will be Germany's chancellor. It cannot be allowed that the frustrated determine Germany's fate." People in the new federal states of Germany (the former German Democratic Republic) were offended by Stoiber's remarks. While the CSU attempted to portray them as "misinterpreted", Stoiber created further controversy when he claimed that "if it was like Bavaria everywhere, there wouldn't be any problems. But unfortunately, ladies and gentlemen, we have everywhere some sections of the populace not as intelligent as in Bavaria." The tone of the comments was exacerbated by a perception by some within Germany of the state of Bavaria as "arrogant".

Many, including members of the CDU, attribute Stoiber's comments and behavior as a contributing factor to the CDU's losses in the 2005 general election. He was accused by many in the CDU/CSU of offering "half-hearted" support to Angela Merkel, with some even accusing him of being reluctant to support a female candidate from the East. (This also contrasted unfavorably with Merkel's robust support for his candidacy in the 2002 election.) He has insinuated that votes were lost because of the choice of a female candidate. He came under heavy fire for these comments from press and politicians alike, especially since he himself lost almost 10% of the Bavarian vote—a dubious feat in itself as Bavarians tend to consistently vote conservatively. Nonetheless, a poll has suggested over 9% may have voted differently if the conservative candidate was a man from the West, although this does not clearly show if such a candidate would have gained or lost votes for the conservatives.

=== BayernLB activities ===
When the Croatian National Bank turned down BayernLB's original bid to take over the local arm of Hypo Alpe-Adria-Bank International, this drew strong criticism from Stoiber, who said the decision was "unacceptable" and a "severe strain" for Bavaria's relations with Croatia. Croatia was seeking to join the European Union at the time. The central bank's board later reviewed and accepted BayernLB's offer of 1.6 billion euros. The investment in Hypo Group Alpe Adria was part of a series of ill-fated investments, which later forced BayernLB to take a 10 billion-euro bailout in the financial crisis.

=== Alleged intentions for a coup ===
In Wolfgang Schäuble's memoirs Erinnerungen. Mein Leben in der Politik (“Memories. My Life in Politics”), published posthumously in 2024, Schäuble claims that in 2015, at the height of the refugee crisis at the time, Stoiber tried to persuade him to overthrow Chancellor Angela Merkel, in order to become chancellor himself. Stoiber commented on that: “I have had as many personal and confidential conversations with few colleagues in my life from the 1980s until the last few years as with my long-standing and close colleague Wolfgang Schäuble. I have never commented on reports about it and of course that still applies to me today after his death."

== Personal life ==
Stoiber is Roman Catholic. He is married to Karin Stoiber. They have three children: Constanze (born 1971, married Hausmann), Veronica (born 1977, married Saß), Dominic (born 1980) and five grandchildren: Johannes (1999), Benedikt (2001), Theresa Marie (2005), Ferdinand (2009) and another grandson (2011).

Stoiber is a keen football fan and operative. In his youth, he played for local football side BCF Wolfratshausen. Stoiber serves as Member of the Supervisory Board of FC Bayern München AG (the stock corporation that runs the professional football section) and Chairman of the Administrative Advisory Board of FC Bayern Munich e.V. (the club that owns the majority of the club corporation).

Before the 2002 election, FC Bayern general manager Uli Hoeneß expressed his support for Stoiber and the CSU. Football legend, former FC Bayern president and DFB vice president Franz Beckenbauer showed his support for Stoiber by letting him join the Germany national football team on their flight home from Japan after the 2002 FIFA World Cup.

== Honours and awards ==
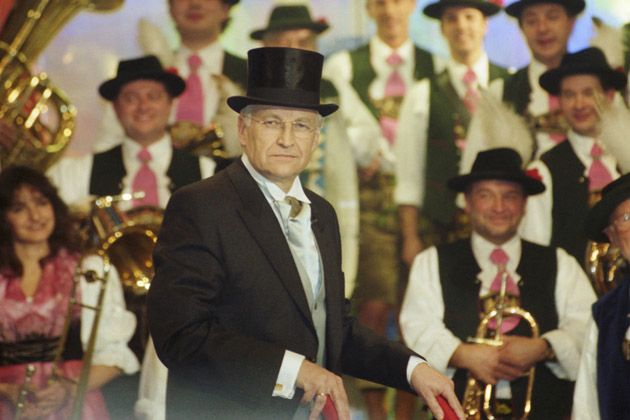
Stoiber during the conferment Order against the deadly seriousness in 2000

- 1984: Bavarian Order of Merit
- 1996: Karl Valentin Order
- 1996: Grand Order of King Dmitar Zvonimir
- 1999: Grand Cross of the Order of the Star of Romania
- 2000: Orden wider den tierischen Ernst
- 2002: Commander of the Legion of Honour
- 2003: Officer of the Ordre national du Québec
- 2004: Grand Cross of the Order of Merit of the Federal Republic of Germany
- 2005: Grand Decoration of Honour in Gold with Sash for Services to the Republic of Austria
- 2006: Grand Cross of Order of Merit of the Italian Republic
- 2007: Large Gold Medal of the province of Upper Austria
- 2007: Honorary degree awarded by the Sogang University
- 2008: Steiger Award
- 2009: Order of Merit of Baden-Württemberg

== Literature ==
- Michael Stiller: Edmund Stoiber: der Kandidat. Econ, München 2002, ISBN 3-430-18786-9.
- Jürgen Roth, Peter Köhler: Edmund G. Stoiber: Weltstaatsmann und Freund des Volkes. Eichborn, Frankfurt 2002, ISBN 3-8218-3584-2.
- Jule Philippi: Wer für alles offen ist, ist nicht ganz dicht. Weisheiten des Edmund Stoiber. Rowohlt, Reinbek bei Hamburg 2007, ISBN 978-3-499-62248-9 .

== See also ==
- List of minister-presidents of Bavaria

Political offices
Preceded by Max Streibl	Minister-President of Bavaria; 1993–2007	Succeeded by Günther Beckstein
Preceded by Johannes Rau	President of the Bundesrat; 1995–1996	Succeeded by Erwin Teufel
Party political offices
Preceded by Theodor Waigel	Leader of the Christian Social Union; 1999–2007	Succeeded by Erwin Huber
