= Munich Land (electoral district) =

Federal electoral district of Germany

220 Munich Land
- Electoral district for the Bundestag
- Munich Land in 2025
- State: Bavaria
- Population: 350,500 (2019)
- Electorate: 233,438 (2025)
- Major settlements: Unterschleißheim; Garching
- Area: 664.3 km^{2}

Current electoral district
- Created: 1949
- Party: CSU
- Member: Florian Hahn
- Elected: 2009, 2013, 2017, 2021, 2025

Munich Land (German: München-Land) is an electoral constituency (German: Wahlkreis) represented in the Bundestag. It elects one member via first-past-the-post voting. Under the current constituency numbering system, it is designated as constituency 220. It is located in southern Bavaria, comprising Landkreis Munich district.

Munich Land was created for the inaugural 1949 federal election. Since 2009, it has been represented by Florian Hahn of the Christian Social Union (CSU).

== Geography ==
Munich Land is located in southern Bavaria. As of the 2021 federal election, it is coterminous with the Landkreis Munich district.

== History ==
Munich Land was created in 1949. In the 1949 election, it was Bavaria constituency 9 in the numbering system. In the 1953 through 1961 elections, it was number 204. In the 1965 through 1976 elections, it was number 209. In the 1980 through 1998 elections, it was number 208. In the 2002 and 2005 elections, it was number 223. In the 2009 and 2013 elections, it was number 222. In the 2017 and 2021 elections, it was number 221. From the 2025 election, it has been number 220.

Originally, the constituency comprised the city of Freising and the districts of Landkreis Munich, Erding, and Freising. In the 1976 election, it comprised the districts of Starnberg and Miesbach and the municipalities of Aying, Baierbrunn, Brunnthal, Gräfelfing, Grünwald, Höhenkirchen-Siegertsbrunn, Neubiberg, Neuried, Oberhaching, Ottobrunn, Planegg, Pullach, Sauerlach, Schäftlarn, Straßlach-Dingharting, and Taufkirchen from the Landkreis Munich district. In the 1980 through 1994 elections, it was coterminous with the Landkreis Munich district. In the 1998 election, it acquired the municipalities of Finsing, Forstern, and Moosinning and the Verwaltungsgemeinschaften of Hörlkofen, Oberding, Oberneuching, and Pastetten from the Erding district. In the 2002 election, it further gained the municipalities of Isen, Lengdorf, and Sankt Wolfgang from the Erding district. In the 2005 and 2009 elections, it comprised the Landkreis Munich and the municipality of Kralling from the Starnberg district. In the 2013 election, it lost the municipality of Kralling and gained the municipality of Gauting. Since the 2017 election, it has been coterminous with the Landkreis Munich district.

Election	No.	Name	Borders
1949	9	München-Land	Landkreis Munich district; Freising city; Freising district; Erding district
1953	204	München-Land	Landkreis Munich district; Freising city; Freising district; Erding district
1957	204	München-Land	Landkreis Munich district; Freising city; Freising district; Erding district
1961	204	München-Land	Landkreis Munich district; Freising city; Freising district; Erding district
1965	209	München-Land	Landkreis Munich district; Freising city; Freising district; Erding district
1969	209	München-Land	Landkreis Munich district; Freising city; Freising district; Erding district
1972	209	München-Land	Landkreis Munich district; Freising city; Freising district; Erding district
1976	209	München-Land	Landkreis Munich district (only Aying, Baierbrunn, Brunnthal, Gräfelfing, Grünwald, Höhenkirchen-Siegertsbrunn, Neubiberg, Neuried, Oberhaching, Ottobrunn, Planegg, Pullach, Sauerlach, Schäftlarn, Straßlach-Dingharting, and Taufkirchen municipalities); Starnberg district; Miesbach district
1980	208	München-Land	Landkreis Munich district
1983	208	München-Land	Landkreis Munich district
1987	208	München-Land	Landkreis Munich district
1990	208	München-Land	Landkreis Munich district
1994	208	München-Land	Landkreis Munich district
1998	208	München-Land	Landkreis Munich district; Erding district (only Finsing, Forstern, and Moosinning municipalities and Hörlkofen, Oberding, Oberneuching, and Pastetten Verwaltungsgemeinschaften)
2002	223	München-Land	Landkreis Munich district; Erding district (only Finsing, Forstern, Isen, Lengdorf, Moosinning, and Sankt Wolfgang municipalities and Hörlkofen, Oberding, Oberneuching, and Pastetten Verwaltungsgemeinschaften)
2005	223	München-Land	Landkreis Munich district; Starnberg district (only Krailling municipality)
2009	222	München-Land	Landkreis Munich district; Starnberg district (only Krailling municipality)
2013	222	München-Land	Landkreis Munich district; Starnberg district (only Gauting municipality)
2017	221	München-Land	Landkreis Munich district
2021	221	München-Land	Landkreis Munich district
2025	220	München-Land	Landkreis Munich district

== Members ==
The constituency has been held by the Christian Social Union (CSU) during all but one Bundestag term since its creation. It was first represented by Anton Besold of the Bavaria Party (BP) from 1949 to 1953. Franz Seidl of the CSU won it in 1953 and served until 1965. He was succeeded by former member Besold, now a member of the CSU, who served from 1965 to 1969. Albert Probst was representative from 1969 to 1976, followed by Franz-Ludwig Schenk Graf von Stauffenberg for one term. Josef Linsmeier served from 1980 to 1990. Martin Mayer was representative from 1990 to 2005, followed by Georg Fahrenschon for one term. Florian Hahn was elected in 2009, and re-elected in 2013, 2017, 2021, and 2025.

Election	Member	Party	%
1949	Anton Besold	BP	32.5
1953	Franz Seidl	CSU	45.1
1957	Franz Seidl	CSU	61.7
1961	Franz Seidl	CSU	58.1
1965	Anton Besold	CSU	55.8
1969	Albert Probst	CSU	50.1
1972	Albert Probst	CSU	54.8
1976	Franz-Ludwig Schenk Graf von Stauffenberg	CSU	58.3
1980	Josef Linsmeier	CSU	50.4
1983	Josef Linsmeier	CSU	54.4
1987	Josef Linsmeier	CSU	51.1
1990	Martin Mayer	CSU	47.4
1994	Martin Mayer	CSU	52.8
1998	Martin Mayer	CSU	52.3
2002	Martin Mayer	CSU	55.6
2005	Georg Fahrenschon	CSU	52.7
2009	Florian Hahn	CSU	45.7
2013	Florian Hahn	CSU	52.5
2017	Florian Hahn	CSU	43.5
2021	Florian Hahn	CSU	39.1
2025	Florian Hahn	CSU	43.1

== Election results ==
=== 2025 election ===
Federal election (2025): Munich Land
Notes:	Blue background denotes the winner of the electorate vote. Pink background denotes a candidate elected from their party list. Yellow background denotes an electorate win by a list member, or other incumbent. A ✓ or ✗ denotes status of any incumbent, win or lose respectively.						
Party	Candidate	Votes	%	±%	Party votes	%	±%
CSU	✓ Florian Hahn	88,197	43.1	▲4.0	80,084	39.0	▲6.5
Greens	Dr. Anton Hofreiter	40,043	19.6	▼0.9	35,335	17.2	▼1.3
SPD	Dr. Korbinian Nicholas Rüger	27,304	13.3	▼1.9	26,648	13.0	▼4.2
AfD	Gerold Joachim Otten	22,919	11.2	▲6.2	24,069	11.7	▲6.5
FDP	Dr. Thomas Jürgen Klaue	8,785	4.3	▼4.9	12,981	6.3	▼8.1
Left	Katinka Regina Maria Burz	8,428	4.1	▲2.3	10,311	5.0	▲2.8
BSW					5,268	2.6	
FW	Otto Bußjäger	6,077	3.0	▼1.0	4,279	2.1	▼1.7
Volt					1,822	0.9	▲0.4
APT	Michael Krämer	3,006	1.5	▲0.2	1,666	0.8	▼0.2
PARTEI					771	0.4	▼0.3
ÖDP					766	0.4	▼0.3
dieBasis					520	0.3	▼1.2
BP					240	0.1	▼0.2
Humanists					161	0.1	Steady
BD					147	0.1	
MLPD					25	0.0	Steady
Informal votes		798			464		
Total valid votes		204,759			205,093		
Turnout		205,557	88.1	▲3.2			
CSU hold	Majority	48,154	23.5	▲4.8			

=== 2021 election ===
Federal election (2021): Munich Land
Notes:	Blue background denotes the winner of the electorate vote. Pink background denotes a candidate elected from their party list. Yellow background denotes an electorate win by a list member, or other incumbent. A ✓ or ✗ denotes status of any incumbent, win or lose respectively.						
Party	Candidate	Votes	%	±%	Party votes	%	±%
CSU	✓ Florian Hahn	77,523	39.1	▼4.4	64,669	32.6	▼4.7
Greens	Anton Hofreiter	40,475	20.4	▲6.7	36,817	18.5	▲5.9
SPD	Korbinian Rüger	30,237	15.2	▼1.0	34,189	17.2	▲3.2
FDP	Axel Schmidt	18,180	9.2	▼0.2	28,696	14.4	▼0.9
AfD	Gerold Otten	9,816	5.0	▼3.4	10,489	5.3	▼4.1
FW	Gerhard Kißlinger	7,791	3.9	▲0.7	7,612	3.8	▲1.9
Left	Katinka Burz	3,685	1.9	▼2.1	4,449	2.2	▼2.9
dieBasis	Stefan Rode	2,880	1.5		2,805	1.4	
Tierschutzpartei	Manfred Kellberger	2,555	1.3		2,054	1.0	▲0.1
ÖDP	Yannick Rouault	2,086	1.1	▼0.6	1,332	0.7	▼0.2
PARTEI	Bernhard Senft	1,928	1.0		1,254	0.6	0.0
Volt					910	0.5	
Team Todenhöfer					808	0.4	
BP	Stefanie Ruck	1,136	0.6		719	0.4	▼0.3
Pirates					659	0.3	0.0
Unabhängige					261	0.1	
Humanists					196	0.1	
Gesundheitsforschung					173	0.1	0.0
V-Partei3					127	0.1	▼0.1
du.					94	0.0	
Bündnis C					87	0.0	
NPD					54	0.0	▼0.1
The III. Path					51	0.0	
LKR					44	0.0	
DKP					32	0.0	0.0
MLPD					29	0.0	0.0
Informal votes		1,041			723		
Total valid votes		198,292			198,610		
Turnout		199,333	84.9	▲1.0			
CSU hold	Majority	37,048	18.7	▼8.5			

=== 2017 election ===
Federal election (2017): Munich Land
Notes:	Blue background denotes the winner of the electorate vote. Pink background denotes a candidate elected from their party list. Yellow background denotes an electorate win by a list member, or other incumbent. A ✓ or ✗ denotes status of any incumbent, win or lose respectively.						
Party	Candidate	Votes	%	±%	Party votes	%	±%
CSU	✓ Florian Hahn	85,347	43.5	▼9.0	73,189	37.3	▼9.8
SPD	Bela Bach (Note: Bach entered the Bundestag on the SPD list after the resignation of Martin Burkert in February 2020.)	31,943	16.3	▼4.2	27,490	14.0	▼5.8
Greens	Anton Hofreiter	26,890	13.7	▲2.6	24,837	12.6	▲2.8
FDP	Jimmy Schulz	18,312	9.3	▲5.6	30,054	15.3	▲7.0
AfD	Gerold Otten	16,458	8.4	▲4.4	18,470	9.4	▲4.5
Left	Eva Schreiber	7,708	3.9	▲1.8	9,996	5.1	▲2.3
FW	Ilse Ertl	6,250	3.2	▲0.2	3,705	1.9	▼0.2
Tierschutzpartei					1,903	1.0	▲0.3
ÖDP	Katharina Graunke	3,228	1.6	▲0.6	1,630	0.8	0.0
PARTEI					1,295	0.7	
BP					1,276	0.6	▼0.1
Pirates					742	0.4	▼1.5
DiB					423	0.2	
V-Partei³					298	0.2	
BGE					268	0.1	
DM					266	0.1	
Gesundheitsforschung					255	0.1	
NPD					184	0.1	▼0.2
DKP					30	0.0	
BüSo					28	0.0	0.0
MLPD					26	0.0	0.0
Informal votes		1,129			900		
Total valid votes		196,136			196,365		
Turnout		197,265	83.9	▲6.5			
CSU hold	Majority	53,404	27.2	▼5.0			

=== 2013 election ===
Federal election (2013): Munich Land
Notes:	Blue background denotes the winner of the electorate vote. Pink background denotes a candidate elected from their party list. Yellow background denotes an electorate win by a list member, or other incumbent. A ✓ or ✗ denotes status of any incumbent, win or lose respectively.						
Party	Candidate	Votes	%	±%	Party votes	%	±%
CSU	✓ Florian Hahn	100,176	52.5	▲6.8	89,504	46.9	▲7.3
SPD	Bela Bach	38,786	20.3	▲0.7	37,497	19.6	▲3.0
Greens	Anton Hofreiter	21,279	11.1	▼2.0	18,960	9.9	▼2.9
AfD	Ulrich Riediger	7,606	4.0		9,303	4.9	
FDP	Jimmy Schulz	7,429	3.9	▼9.8	16,300	8.5	▼11.3
FW	Ilse Ertl	5,551	2.9		3,986	2.1	
Left	Wolfgang Seidel	3,996	2.1	▼1.7	5,380	2.8	▼1.7
Pirates	Volker Kunze	3,299	1.7		3,546	1.9	0.0
ÖDP	Christiane Lüst	2,211	1.2	▲0.1	1,661	0.9	▲0.1
Tierschutzpartei					1,346	0.7	▲0.1
BP					1,325	0.7	▲0.2
NPD					626	0.3	▼0.3
REP					533	0.3	▼0.1
DIE FRAUEN					237	0.1	
Party of Reason		339	0.2		204	0.1	
DIE VIOLETTEN					189	0.1	▼0.1
PRO					112	0.1	
RRP		200	0.1	▼0.7	92	0.0	▼0.7
MLPD					32	0.0	0.0
BüSo					27	0.0	0.0
Informal votes		1,161			1,173		
Total valid votes		190,872			190,860		
Turnout		192,033	77.5	▼1.7			
CSU hold	Majority	61,390	32.2	▲6.0			

=== 2009 election ===
Federal election (2009): Munich Land
Notes:	Blue background denotes the winner of the electorate vote. Pink background denotes a candidate elected from their party list. Yellow background denotes an electorate win by a list member, or other incumbent. A ✓ or ✗ denotes status of any incumbent, win or lose respectively.						
Party	Candidate	Votes	%	±%	Party votes	%	±%
CSU	Florian Hahn	83,856	45.7	▼7.0	73,273	39.8	▼5.6
SPD	Ingrid Lenz-Aktas	35,805	19.5	▼10.8	30,776	16.7	▼7.2
FDP	Jimmy Schulz	24,634	13.4	▲7.2	36,208	19.7	▲5.1
Greens	Anton Hofreiter	24,386	13.3	▲5.5	23,433	12.7	▲2.1
Left	Wolfgang Seidel	6,914	3.8	▲1.8	8,318	4.5	▲2.0
Pirates					3,358	1.8	
ÖDP	Ute Drothler	2,027	1.1		1,467	0.8	
FAMILIE	Raimund Enders	1,975	1.1		1,099	0.6	▲0.1
RRP	Peter Lachmann	1,636	0.9		1,434	0.8	
NPD	Philipp Hasselbach	1,480	0.8	▼0.2	1,099	0.6	▼0.1
Tierschutzpartei					1,084	0.6	
BP					1,016	0.6	▲0.1
REP					775	0.4	0.0
Freie Union	Cornelia Kienzer	686	0.4				
DIE VIOLETTEN					322	0.2	
PBC					102	0.1	0.0
DVU					86	0.0	
CM					78	0.0	
BüSo					57	0.0	0.0
MLPD					20	0.0	0.0
Informal votes		1,716			1,110		
Total valid votes		183,399			184,005		
Turnout		185,115	79.1	▼4.4			
CSU hold	Majority	48,051	26.2	▲3.8			

=== 2005 election ===
Federal election (2005):Munich Land
Notes:	Blue background denotes the winner of the electorate vote. Pink background denotes a candidate elected from their party list. Yellow background denotes an electorate win by a list member, or other incumbent. A ✓ or ✗ denotes status of any incumbent, win or lose respectively.						
Party	Candidate	Votes	%	±%	Party votes	%	±%
CSU	Georg Fahrenschon	98,674	52.7	▼1.3	85,350	45.4	▼8.7
SPD	Otto Schily	56,830	30.3	▼2.9	45,027	24.0	▼1.0
Greens	Anton Hofreiter	14,555	7.8	▲1.5	20,018	10.7	▼0.6
FDP	Martin Zeil	11,630	6.2	▲1.3	27,439	14.6	▲7.6
Left	Lilian Schlumberger-Dogu	3,750	2.0	▲1.3	4,826	2.6	▲1.8
NPD	Norman Bordin	1,834	1.0		1,231	0.7	▲0.6
Familie					917	0.5	
REP					856	0.5	▲0.1
BP					815	0.4	▲0.3
GRAUEN					755	0.4	▲0.3
Feminist					361	0.2	▲0.1
PBC					197	0.1	▲0.1
BüSo					107	0.1	0.0
MLPD					51	0.0	0.0
Informal votes		2,022			1,346		
Total valid votes		187,273			187,949		
Turnout		189,295	83.5	▼2.7			
CSU hold	Majority	41,844	22.4				
