= Munich School of Politics and Public Policy =

Coordinates: 48°8′49″N 11°33′48″E

Bavarian School of Public Policy
- Hochschule für Politik München
- Type: Public
- Established: 1950
- Rector: Urs Gasser
- Location: Munich, Germany
- Website: hfp.tum.de

The Munich School of Politics and Public Policy (German: Hochschule für Politik München) is an independent institution for political science within the Technical University of Munich. Established in 1950 by the Bavarian Parliament, the school was initially created to promote democratic education in post-war Germany. In 2014, it became an independent institution within TUM, integrating technical and natural sciences into its political science curriculum.

== History ==
The Munich School of Politics and Public Policy (Hochschule für Politik München, HfP) was established in 1950 by decision of the Bavarian State Parliament. The institution operated independently and offered academic instruction in political science. In 2014, it was restructured and integrated as an affiliated institution of the Technical University of Munich (TUM). As part of this reorganization, the academic framework was revised to include interdisciplinary elements linking political science with technological and scientific disciplines.

== Professors ==
the following professorships were appointed for the Munich School of Politics and Public Policy

- Chair of International Relations: Tim Büthe
- Chair of European and Global Governance: Eugénia da Conceição-Heldt
- Professorship of Political Data Science: Simon Hegelich
- Professorship of Political Philosophy and Theory: Lena Ulbricht komm.
- Chair of Computational Social Science and Big Data: Jürgen Pfeffer
- Chair of Environmental and Climate Policy: Miranda Schreurs
- Professorship of Policy Analysis: Stefan Wurster

== Study programs ==
Together with the Technical University of Munich, the Munich School of Politics and Public Policy offers two unique study programs. The Bachelor of Science "Political Science" and the Master "Politics and Technology".

=== Bachelor of Science ===
The Bachelor's program in Political Science (B. Sc.) was started in the winter semester 2016/17.

==== Course contents ====
In addition to traditional political science subfields, the program includes modules in economics, law, technology, natural sciences, life sciences, and medicine (e.g., mobility, energy, big data, and health).

==== Degree ====
The bachelor's degree program in "Political Science" is completed with the academic degree of Bachelor of Science (B.Sc.).

=== Master of Science ===
Since the winter semester 2017/18, the Munich School of Public Policy offers a master's program in Politics & Technology (M.Sc.).

==== Course contents ====
This program is an innovative, inter- and transdisciplinary study in policy fields at the intersection of politics and technology: Not only innovative contents of political science ("Democracy in the Digital Age", "Governance of Big Transformations: Environmental, Social & Technological Aspects", "Global Governance, Ethics & Technology"), but also engineering and natural science modules from the faculties of the Technical University of Munich in the fields of "Digital Technology", "Urbanization, Mobility, Energy", "Social Responsibility and Corporate Governance" and "Economics & Policy" are offered.

==== Degree ====
The masters's degree program in "Politics & Technology" is completed with the academic degree of Master of Science (M.Sc.).

== Research ==
The Munich School of Politics and Public Policy (HfP), affiliated with the Technical University of Munich (TUM), conducts research that integrates political science with technological and scientific disciplines. The school's research focuses on the interactions between politics, society, economy, and technology.

Research areas at HfP include:

- International Relations
- European and Global Governance
- Political Data Science
- Political Philosophy and Theory
- Computational Social Science and Big Data
- Environmental and Climate Policy
- Policy Analysis

The institution also hosts the TUM Think Tank, which facilitates societal and political change by bridging theory and practice, leveraging technological and scientific advancements at TUM.

HfP's research approach is characterized by its interdisciplinary nature, combining classical political science with technical subjects to address contemporary challenges such as energy transition, climate crisis, big data, artificial intelligence, and mobility.

The school supports doctoral research and offers structured programs for early-career researchers, fostering an environment conducive to academic inquiry at the intersection of politics and technology.

== Notable alumni ==
- Hans Henning Atrott (born 1944), German author and theorist
- Dorothee Bär (born 1978), politician (CSU)
- Markus Blume (born 1975), politician (CSU)
- Géza Andreas von Geyr (born 1962), vice-president of the Bundesnachrichtendienst
- Karl-Theodor zu Guttenberg (born 1971), former German Minister of Defence (2009–2011)
- Klaus Höchstetter (born 1964), expert in economics
- Katharina Holzinger, Prorektor of the University of Konstanz
- Franz Kohout (born 1953), Professor of political science
- Harry Luck (born 1972), journalist
- Franz Maget (born 1953), Chairman of the SPD Parliamentary Group in the Landtag of Bavaria
- Otto-Peter Obermeier (born 1941), Publisher of the journal "the blue rider - journal for philosophy"
- Michael Piazolo (born 1959), political scientist
- Gerhard Polt, (born 1942), actor and cabaret artist
- Ralph Rotte (born 1968), Professor at the RWTH Aachen
- Sascha Spoun (born 1969), President of the University of Lüneburg
- Christiane Stenger (born 1987), author and presenter
- Edmund Stoiber (born 1941), former Minister-President of Bavaria (1993–2007)
