= Eugénia da Conceição-Heldt =

Portuguese political scientist

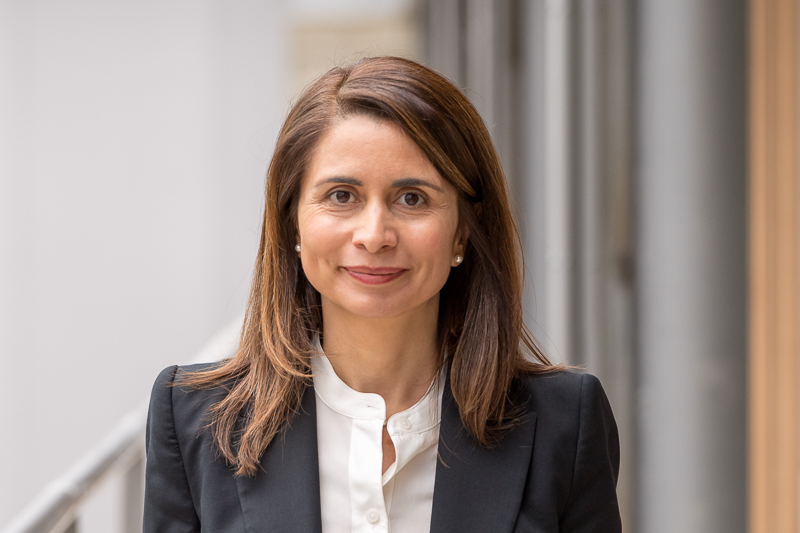
Portrait of Eugénia da Conceição-Heldt

Eugénia da Conceição-Heldt (born 1970) is a Portuguese-German political scientist. From 2016 to 2021, she was the reform rector of the Bavarian School of Public Policy at the Technical University of Munich and the founding dean of the TUM School of Governance. She is known for her research on the delegation of power to international organizations, European integration, global economic governance, two-level games theory, international negotiation analysis, as well as power and accountability in global governance.

== Education ==
Da Conceição-Heldt studied European Studies and graduated from the Technical University of Lisbon and the Free University of Berlin. She received her PhD in Political Science from the Free University of Berlin in 2002 and completed her habilitation at the Humboldt-University of Berlin in 2009.

== Academic career ==
Between 2003 and 2008, da Conceição-Heldt was a research assistant for comparative analysis of political systems at the Institute for Social and Political Science at the Humboldt-University of Berlin. In the academic year 2007/2008 she was a Jean Monnet Fellow at the Robert Schuman Center for Advanced Studies at the European University Institute in Florence. After a guest fellowship at the Center for European Studies at Carleton University (2009), she was a guest professor for comparative politics at the Heinrich Heine University Institute of Social Sciences in Düsseldorf (2009/2010) and for international relations and European integration at the Free University of Berlin (2010/2011). Between 2011 and 2012, she was a Heisenberg Fellow at the WZB Berlin Social Science Center, working under the supervision of Michael Zürn. In 2012, she became professor of international politics at the Technical University of Dresden. Between September and December 2015, she was a visiting Fulbright fellow at the Center for European Studies at Harvard University. On July 1, 2016, da Conceição-Heldt was appointed Chair of European and Global Governance at the Bavarian School of Public Policy at the Technical University of Munich. Beginning in March and ending in June 2022, she was a visiting professor at Princeton University's School of Public and International Affairs.

From 2016 to 2021, da Conceição-Heldt served as reform rector of the Bavarian School of Public Policy at the Technical University of Munich and as founding dean of the TUM School of Governance.

For her research, da Conceição-Heldt has acquired numerous national and international third-party funding projects, including from the German Research Foundation (DFG) and the European Research Council (ERC). In 2013, da Conceição-Heldt received a European Research Council grant and is conducting research on the delegation of power to international organizations and their institutional empowerment over time (DELPOWIO). As the principal investigator of a research team, she developed a theory of how international organizations get empowered over time, integrating a temporal dimension in to the principal-agent approach. In 2022, da Conceição-Heldt was awarded the prestigious Carl von Linde Fellowship by the Technical University of Munich. The Fellowship honors outstanding, internationally recognized research achievements and is endowed with 250,000 euros.

== Significant awards ==
- 2022: Carl von Linde Fellowship of the Institute for Advanced Study at the Technical University of Munich
- 2022: Visiting Research Scholar at Princeton University, School of Public and International Affairs
- 2019: Medal for Outstanding Contributions to the Free State of Bavaria in Europe and the World
- 2015: Fulbright Fellowship at the Center for European Studies, Harvard University
- 2012: Consolidator Grant from the European Research Council (1.3 Million €)
- 2010: Heisenberg Fellowship, German Research Foundation (DFG)
- 2009: Calouste Gulbenkian Fellowship, Johns Hopkins University, School of Advanced International Studies, Washington D.C. (declined)
- 2007-2008: Jean Monnet Fellowship, European University Institute (Florence)
- 1998: Prize Europe for the Diploma thesis of the German Association of Berlin Merchants and Industrialists
