= Albert Probst =

German politician

Member of the Bundestag
- In office 20 October 1969 – 26 October 1998
- Preceded by: Anton Besold
- Succeeded by: Franz Obermeier
- Constituency: Munich Land (1969–1998); Freising (1976–1998)

Personal details
- Born: 29 December 1931 Garching, Germany
- Died: 24 March 2015 (aged 83) Munich, Germany
- Party: Christian Social Union
- Children: 4
- Education: TU Munich

Albert Probst (29 December 1931 – 24 March 2015) was a German politician for the Christian Social Union in Bavaria. From 1982 to 1991 he was parliamentary Secretary of State at the Federal Ministry for Research and Technology.

== Early life and education ==
Probst was born in Garching bei München, Upper Bavaria. After graduation in 1951 from the Maximilians Gymnasium in Munich, Probst took an agricultural apprenticeship. He then studied agricultural sciences at the Technical University of Munich, graduating in 1958 with a diploma as an agricultural engineer. In Munich, he served in the Catholic student group K. D. St. V. Agilolfia in Freising. He then joined the agricultural civil service, working at the milk research institute at the Technical University of Munich. He left this institute in 1961, after completing research.

He returned to the Technical University of Munich in 1963, after two years as an agriculture adviser in France, to work on a research project concerning population genetics. At this time he began to participate in municipal politics.

== Political career ==
Probst was deputy chair of the culture team of the Christian Social Union for many years.

From 1960 to 1973, he belonged to the country of the circle day of the district of Munich. He was also a member of the Garching local council from 1966 until 1990.

From 1969 to 1998, Probst was a member of the German Bundestag. He was chair of the Committee on Development and Science from 1972 to 1976, and from 1976 to 1982 chaired the Committee on Research and Technology.

Until 1982, he chaired the science development team and served as spokesperson for the Christian Socialist Union rural group.

Probst was a directly selected delegate of the Munich Land and Freising constituencies in the Bundestag.

From 1991 to 1999 he represented Germany at parliamentary meetings of the Council of Europe, and at the European Union.

=== Public offices ===
On 4 October 1982, Probst became Parliamentary Secretary of State at the Federal Ministry for Research and Technology, in the federal government led by Chancellor Helmut Kohl. Here he advocated the early provision of computers in schools. He served until the Bundestag election in 1990, leaving government on 24 January 1991.

== Personal life ==
Probst was married and had four children.

== See also ==
- Cabinet Kohl I
- Cabinet Kohl II
- Cabinet Kohl III
