= Uwe Kekeritz =

German politician (born 1953)

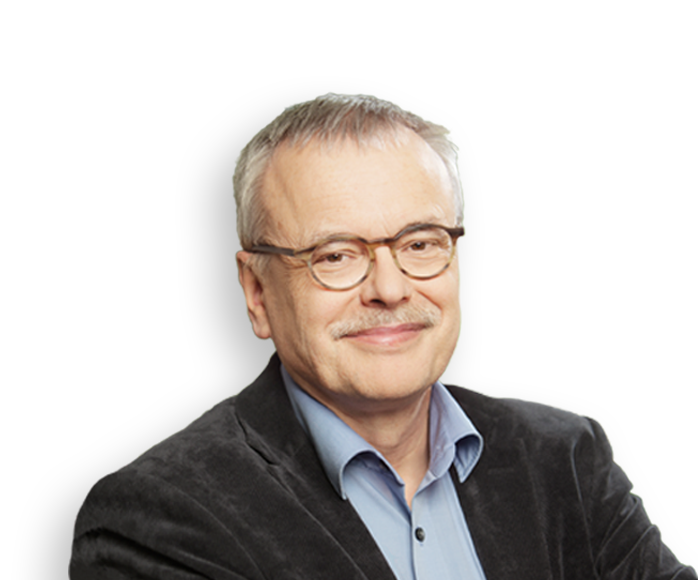
- Kekeritz in 2016

Member of the Bundestag
- In office 2009–2021
- Incumbent
- Assumed office 1 December 2024

Personal details
- Born: 9 October 1953 (age 72) Oy-Mittelberg, West Germany
- Party: Greens
- Education: University of Erlangen-Nuremberg

Uwe Kekeritz (born 9 October 1953) is a German politician of Alliance 90/The Greens who has served as a member of the Bundestag from the state of Bavaria since 2024. He previously served terms from 2009 until 2021.

== Early life and career ==
After completing his vocational baccalaureate, Kekeritz went to London, where he initially studied English as a foreign language. After his return to Germany, he stayed in Nuremberg and in 1987 he graduated from the Faculty of Economics and Social Sciences at the University of Erlangen-Nuremberg with a degree in Economics.

From 1982 to 1988 Kekeritz worked as an independent consultant for small entrepreneurs and start-ups. In 1988 he moved with his family to Cameroon for two years, where he taught mathematics and English at a secondary school via the German Development Service (DED). He continued his teaching activities in Germany.

== Political career ==
Kekeritz first became a member of the Bundestag in the 2009 German federal election. He was a member of the Committee on Economic Cooperation and Development and spokesman for his group on development policy.

In addition to his committee assignments, Kekeritz served as chairman of the German Parliamentary Friendship Group for Relations with the Western African States.

Kekeritz lost his seat in the 2021 German federal election. In December 2024, he returned to the Bundestag replacing Manuela Rottmann.

== Other activities ==
- Transparency Germany, Member of the Board (since 2022)
- German Institute for Development Evaluation (DEval), Member of the Advisory Board (–2021)
- German Foundation for World Population (DSW), Member of the Parliamentary Advisory Board (–2021)
- Heinrich Böll Foundation, Member of the North/South Advisory Board
