= Florian Hahn =

German politician

Florian Hahn MdB
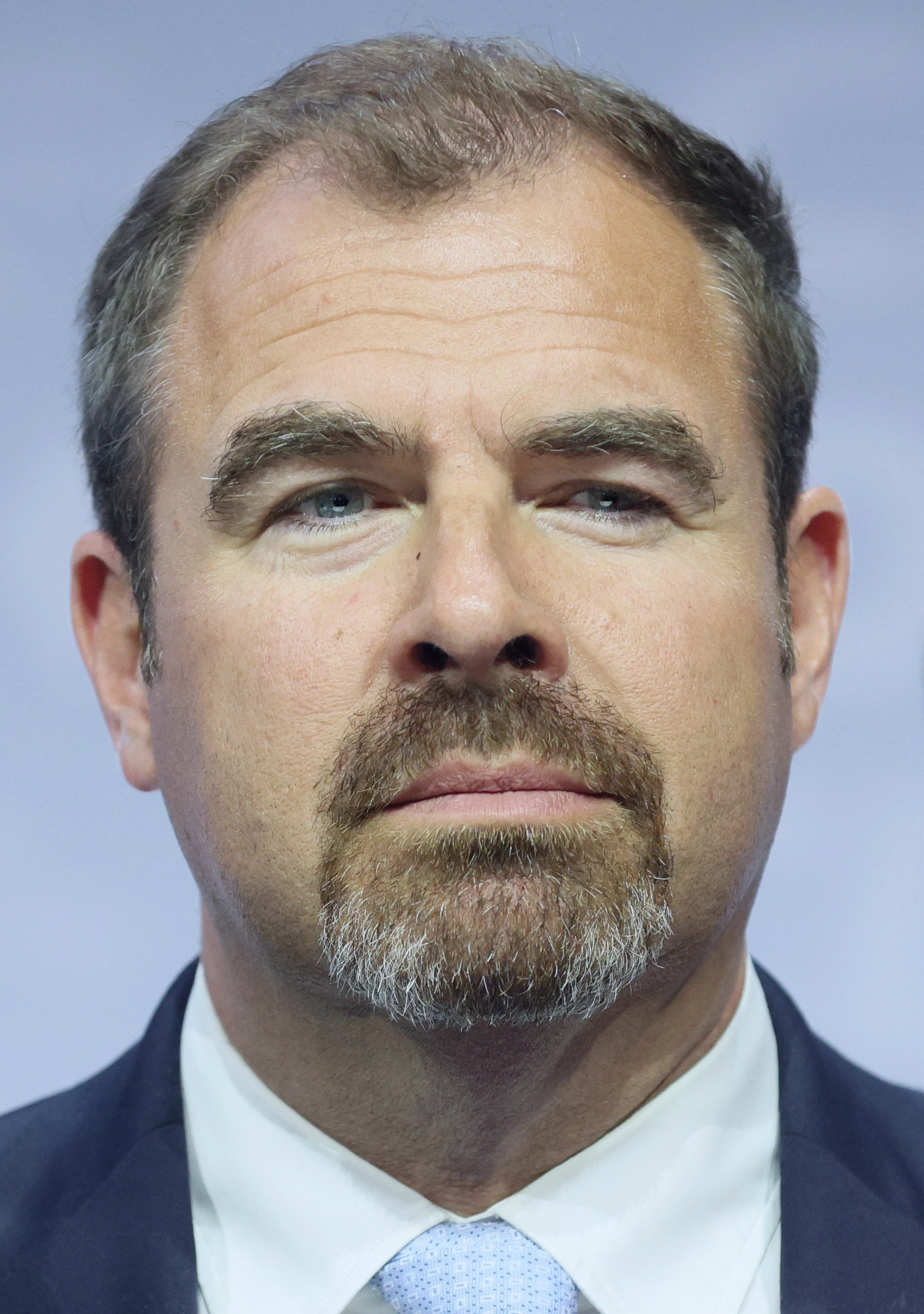
- Hahn in 2025

Deputy General Secretary of the Christian Social Union
- In office January 2019 – February 2022
- Leader: Markus Söder
- Preceded by: Daniela Ludwig
- Succeeded by: Tanja Schorer-Dremel

Member of the Bundestag; for Munich Land
- Incumbent
- Assumed office 27 October 2009
- Preceded by: Marion Seib

Personal details
- Born: 14 March 1974 (age 52) Munich, West Germany
- Party: Christian Social Union
- Children: 2
- Education: University for Continuing Education Krems

Florian Hahn (born 14 March 1974) is a German politician of the Christian Social Union (CSU) who has been serving as a member of the Bundestag from the state of Bavaria since 2009.

In addition to his work in parliament, Hahn has been serving as Minister of State at the Federal Foreign Office in the government of Chancellor Friedrich Merz since 2025.

== Early career ==
From 2006 until 2009, Hahn worked on public relations at defence company Krauss-Maffei Wegmann (KMW) in Munich.

== Political career ==
Hahn joined the Young Union (JU) in 1989.

Hahn first became a member of the Bundestag in the 2009 German federal election. He is a member of the Committee on European Union Affairs and the Defence Committee.

In the negotiations to form a Grand Coalition of Chancellor Angela Merkel's Christian Democrats and the Social Democrats (SPD) following the 2013 federal elections, Rachel Hahn was a part of the CDU/CSU delegation in the working group on education and research policy, led by Johanna Wanka and Doris Ahnen. In similar negotiations following the 2017 federal elections, he was part of the working group on European affairs, led by Peter Altmaier, Alexander Dobrindt and Achim Post. He has been the CDU/CSU's parliamentary group's spokesperson on European affairs (2018-2021) and defense (since 2021).

Since 2019, Hahn has been serving as Deputy Secretary General of the CSU, under the leadership of chairman Markus Söder. That year, he co-chaired the CSU's convention in Munich, alongside Markus Blume and Thomas Silberhorn.

== Other activities ==
=== Corporate boards ===
- IABG, Member of the Supervisory Board (2010–2017)
- Quantum-Systems, Member of the Advisory Board (–2017)

=== Non-profit organizations ===
- European Academy of Bavaria, Member of the Board of Trustees
- Federal Academy for Security Policy (BAKS), Member of the Advisory Board (since 2018)
- Institute for European Politics (IEP), Member of the Board of Trustees
- Max Planck Institute for Astrophysics, Member of the Board of Trustees
- Max Planck Institute for Extraterrestrial Physics, Member of the Board of Trustees
- Munich Aerospace, Member of the Board of Trustees

== Political positions ==
In June 2017, Hahn voted against Germany's introduction of same-sex marriage.

In a joint letter initiated by Norbert Röttgen and Anthony Gonzalez ahead of the 47th G7 summit in 2021, Hahn joined some 70 legislators from Europe, the US and Japan in calling upon their leaders to take a tough stance on China and to "avoid becoming dependent" on the country for technology including artificial intelligence and 5G.
