= Rosenheim (electoral district) =

Federal electoral district of Germany

221 Rosenheim
- Electoral district for the Bundestag
- Rosenheim in 2025
- State: Bavaria
- Population: 324,900 (2019)
- Electorate: 238,400 (2025)
- Major settlements: Rosenheim; Bad Aibling; Kolbermoor
- Area: 1,476.7 km^{2}

Current electoral district
- Created: 1949
- Party: CSU
- Member: Daniela Ludwig
- Elected: 2005, 2009, 2013, 2017, 2021, 2025

Rosenheim is an electoral constituency (German: Wahlkreis) represented in the Bundestag. It elects one member via first-past-the-post voting. Under the current constituency numbering system, it is designated as constituency 221. It is located in southern Bavaria, comprising the city of Rosenheim and the Landkreis Rosenheim district.

Rosenheim was created for the inaugural 1949 federal election. Since 2005, it has been represented by Daniela Ludwig of the Christian Social Union (CSU).

== Geography ==
Rosenheim is located in southern Bavaria. As of the 2021 federal election, it comprises the independent city of Rosenheim and the district of Landkreis Rosenheim.

== History ==
Rosenheim was created in 1949. In the 1949 election, it was Bavaria constituency 10 in the numbering system. In the 1953 through 1961 elections, it was number 205. In the 1965 through 1976 elections, it was number 210. In the 1980 through 1998 elections, it was number 209. In the 2002 and 2005 elections, it was number 224. In the 2009 and 2013 elections, it was number 223. In the 2017 and 2021 elections, it was number 222. From the 2025 election, it has been number 221.

Originally, the constituency comprised the independent city of Rosenheim and the districts of Landkreis Rosenheim, Bad Aibling, and Ebersberg. In the 1976 election, it comprised the city of Rosenheim and the districts of Landkreis Rosenheim and Ebersberg. It acquired its current borders in the 1980 election.

Election	No.	Name	Borders
1949	10	Rosenheim	Rosenheim city; Landkreis Rosenheim district; Bad Aibling district; Ebersberg district
1953	205	Rosenheim	Rosenheim city; Landkreis Rosenheim district; Bad Aibling district; Ebersberg district
1957	205	Rosenheim	Rosenheim city; Landkreis Rosenheim district; Bad Aibling district; Ebersberg district
1961	205	Rosenheim	Rosenheim city; Landkreis Rosenheim district; Bad Aibling district; Ebersberg district
1965	210	Rosenheim	Rosenheim city; Landkreis Rosenheim district; Bad Aibling district; Ebersberg district
1969	210	Rosenheim	Rosenheim city; Landkreis Rosenheim district; Bad Aibling district; Ebersberg district
1972	210	Rosenheim	Rosenheim city; Landkreis Rosenheim district; Bad Aibling district; Ebersberg district
1976	210	Rosenheim	Rosenheim city; Landkreis Rosenheim district; Ebersberg district
1980	209	Rosenheim	Rosenheim city; Landkreis Rosenheim district
1983	209	Rosenheim	Rosenheim city; Landkreis Rosenheim district
1987	209	Rosenheim	Rosenheim city; Landkreis Rosenheim district
1990	209	Rosenheim	Rosenheim city; Landkreis Rosenheim district
1994	209	Rosenheim	Rosenheim city; Landkreis Rosenheim district
1998	209	Rosenheim	Rosenheim city; Landkreis Rosenheim district
2002	224	Rosenheim	Rosenheim city; Landkreis Rosenheim district
2005	224	Rosenheim	Rosenheim city; Landkreis Rosenheim district
2009	223	Rosenheim	Rosenheim city; Landkreis Rosenheim district
2013	223	Rosenheim	Rosenheim city; Landkreis Rosenheim district
2017	222	Rosenheim	Rosenheim city; Landkreis Rosenheim district
2021	222	Rosenheim	Rosenheim city; Landkreis Rosenheim district
2025	221	Rosenheim	Rosenheim city; Landkreis Rosenheim district

== Members ==
The constituency has been held by the Christian Social Union (CSU) during all but one Bundestag term since its creation. It was first represented by Hugo Decker of the Bavaria Party (BP) from 1949 to 1953. Ludwig Franz of the CSU won it in 1953 and served until 1976. He was succeeded by Hans Graf Huyn, who was representative until 1987. Wolfgang Zeitlmann then served from 1987 to 2005. Daniela Ludwig was elected in 2005, and re-elected in 2009, 2013, 2017, 2021, and 2025.

Election	Member	Party	%
1949	Hugo Decker	BP	30.4
1953	Ludwig Franz	CSU	41.9
1957	Ludwig Franz	CSU	53.9
1961	Ludwig Franz	CSU	55.9
1965	Ludwig Franz	CSU	59.0
1969	Ludwig Franz	CSU	55.6
1972	Ludwig Franz	CSU	57.9
1976	Hans Graf Huyn	CSU	62.6
1980	Hans Graf Huyn	CSU	62.5
1983	Hans Graf Huyn	CSU	65.8
1987	Wolfgang Zeitlmann	CSU	61.4
1990	Wolfgang Zeitlmann	CSU	56.4
1994	Wolfgang Zeitlmann	CSU	60.6
1998	Wolfgang Zeitlmann	CSU	55.2
2002	Wolfgang Zeitlmann	CSU	63.1
2005	Daniela Ludwig	CSU	60.3
2009	Daniela Ludwig	CSU	51.5
2013	Daniela Ludwig	CSU	58.1
2017	Daniela Ludwig	CSU	45.9
2021	Daniela Ludwig	CSU	36.1
2025	Daniela Ludwig	CSU	40.9

== Election results ==
=== 2025 election ===
Federal election (2025): Rosenheim
Notes:	Blue background denotes the winner of the electorate vote. Pink background denotes a candidate elected from their party list. Yellow background denotes an electorate win by a list member, or other incumbent. A ✓ or ✗ denotes status of any incumbent, win or lose respectively.						
Party	Candidate	Votes	%	±%	Party votes	%	±%
CSU	✓ Daniela Ludwig	82,005	40.9	▲4.7	75,528	37.6	▲6.6
AfD	Leyla Bilge	36,811	18.3	▲10.1	39,370	19.6	▲10.9
Greens	Victoria Broßart	25,185	12.6	▼1.2	25,018	12.5	▼1.2
SPD	Reka Molnar	17,905	8.9	▼3.1	19,265	9.6	▼4.8
FW	Sepp Hofer	16,019	8.0	▼0.9	9,469	4.7	▼4.9
Left	Ates Nils Gürpinar	9,147	4.6	▲2.4	10,130	5.0	▲2.6
FDP	Marcus Moga	5,724	2.9	▼6.4	9,362	4.7	▼7.4
BSW					6,017	3.0	
APT	Peter Steyrer	2,706	1.3		1,710	0.9	▼0.1
dieBasis	Peggy Jacqueline Galić	2,341	1.2	▼3.6	1,249	0.6	▼2.6
Volt	Jana Jacob	1,891	0.9		1,001	0.5	▲0.2
ÖDP					1,000	0.5	▼0.4
PARTEI					817	0.4	▼0.3
BP					479	0.2	▼0.7
BD	Christiane Angela Wegner	531	0.3		292	0.1	
Humanists	Franziska Heywinkel	350	0.2		173	0.1	Steady
MLPD					31	0.0	Steady
Informal votes		954			658		
Total valid votes		200,615			200,911		
Turnout		201,569	84.6	▲3.9			
CSU hold	Majority	45,194	22.6	▲0.3			

=== 2021 election ===
Federal election (2021): Rosenheim
Notes:	Blue background denotes the winner of the electorate vote. Pink background denotes a candidate elected from their party list. Yellow background denotes an electorate win by a list member, or other incumbent. A ✓ or ✗ denotes status of any incumbent, win or lose respectively.						
Party	Candidate	Votes	%	±%	Party votes	%	±%
CSU	✓ Daniela Ludwig	68,670	36.1	▼9.8	59,126	31.0	▼9.5
Greens	Victoria Broßart	26,183	13.8	▲4.4	25,962	13.6	▲3.6
SPD	Pankraz Schaberl	22,869	12.0	▲0.2	27,406	14.4	▲3.1
FDP	Michael Linnerer	17,682	9.3	▲1.9	23,049	12.1	▲1.1
FW	Gerhard Schloots	16,869	8.9	▲5.5	18,261	9.6	▲7.2
AfD	Andreas Kohlberger	15,764	8.3	▼4.7	16,570	8.7	▼5.2
dieBasis	Nino Kornhaß	9,069	4.8		6,075	3.2	
Left	Ates Gürpinar	4,091	2.2	▼1.7	4,607	2.4	▼2.7
Tierschutzpartei					1,882	1.0	▲0.1
ÖDP	Ludwig Maier	3,698	1.9	▼0.2	1,633	0.9	▼0.3
BP	Stephan Fröhlich	2,584	1.4	▼1.1	1,737	0.9	▼0.9
PARTEI	Nikolaus Starkmeth	2,466	1.3		1,385	0.7	▲0.2
Pirates					566	0.3	0.0
Team Todenhöfer					488	0.3	
Volt					486	0.3	
Unabhängige					287	0.1	
V-Partei3					213	0.1	▼0.1
Gesundheitsforschung					198	0.1	0.0
Humanists					162	0.1	
Bündnis C					129	0.1	
BüSo	Gerald Strickner	119	0.1	0.0			
NPD					95	0.1	▼0.1
du.					94	0.1	
The III. Path					77	0.0	
DKP					29	0.0	0.0
LKR					27	0.0	
MLPD					17	0.0	0.0
Informal votes		1,346			849		
Total valid votes		190,064			190,561		
Turnout		191,410	80.6	▲1.3			
CSU hold	Majority	42,487	22.3	▼10.6			

=== 2017 election ===
Federal election (2017): Rosenheim
Notes:	Blue background denotes the winner of the electorate vote. Pink background denotes a candidate elected from their party list. Yellow background denotes an electorate win by a list member, or other incumbent. A ✓ or ✗ denotes status of any incumbent, win or lose respectively.						
Party	Candidate	Votes	%	±%	Party votes	%	±%
CSU	✓ Daniela Ludwig	84,981	45.9	▼12.2	75,178	40.5	▼13.6
AfD	Andreas Winhart	23,988	13.0	▲8.9	25,697	13.9	▲9.0
SPD	Abuzar Erdogan	21,890	11.8	▼0.7	20,967	11.3	▼3.5
Greens	Korbinian Gall	17,307	9.4	0.0	18,571	10.0	▲1.6
FDP	Michael Linnerer	13,750	7.4	▲4.8	20,311	11.0	▲6.0
Left	Sebastian Misselhorn	7,036	3.8	▲1.4	9,449	5.1	▲2.2
FW	Maria Fischer	6,177	3.3	▲0.6	4,426	2.4	▲0.1
BP	Bernhard Neumann	4,495	2.4	▲0.2	3,425	1.8	▼0.1
ÖDP	Ludwig Maier	4,053	2.2	▲0.2	2,157	1.2	▼0.3
Tierschutzpartei					1,643	0.9	▲0.2
PARTEI					1,041	0.6	
Pirates	Olaf Krueger	1,073	0.6	▼1.7	602	0.3	▼1.4
DM					379	0.2	
V-Partei³					327	0.2	
DiB					322	0.2	
NPD					285	0.2	▼0.3
BGE					277	0.1	
Gesundheitsforschung					227	0.1	
BüSo	Gerald Strickner	198	0.1	0.0	87	0.0	0.0
DKP					50	0.0	
MLPD					36	0.0	0.0
Informal votes		1,544			1,035		
Total valid votes		184,948			185,457		
Turnout		186,492	79.3	▲8.8			
CSU hold	Majority	60,993	32.9	▼12.7			

=== 2013 election ===
Federal election (2013): Rosenheim
Notes:	Blue background denotes the winner of the electorate vote. Pink background denotes a candidate elected from their party list. Yellow background denotes an electorate win by a list member, or other incumbent. A ✓ or ✗ denotes status of any incumbent, win or lose respectively.						
Party	Candidate	Votes	%	±%	Party votes	%	±%
CSU	✓ Daniela Ludwig	93,964	58.1	▲6.6	87,569	54.1	▲7.4
SPD	Abuzar Erdogan	20,229	12.5	▼1.9	23,966	14.8	▲2.1
Greens	Ursula Zeitlmann	15,125	9.4	▼2.8	13,631	8.4	▼3.0
AfD	Jürgen Gladigau	6,571	4.1		7,792	4.8	
FW	Robert Multrus	4,484	2.8		3,653	2.3	
FDP	Thomas Rauscher	4,272	2.6	▼6.6	8,040	5.0	▼9.5
Left	Walter Mini	3,932	2.4	▼1.3	4,688	2.9	▼1.5
BP	Bernhard Neumann	3,674	2.3	0.0	3,088	1.9	▲0.3
Pirates	Hartmut Ernst	3,651	2.3		2,788	1.7	▲0.2
ÖDP	Ludwig Maier	3,290	2.0	▼0.4	2,419	1.5	▼0.2
REP	Peter Staudenhöchtl	2,015	1.2	▼0.9	1,368	0.8	▼1.0
Tierschutzpartei					1,111	0.7	▲0.1
NPD					772	0.5	▼0.3
DIE FRAUEN					269	0.2	
DIE VIOLETTEN					241	0.1	▼0.1
Independent	Bauer	226	0.1				
Party of Reason					167	0.1	
BüSo	Gerald Strickner	189	0.1	▼0.1	96	0.1	▼0.1
PRO					93	0.1	
RRP					36	0.0	▼1.0
MLPD					24	0.0	0.0
Informal votes		1,336			1,147		
Total valid votes		161,622			161,811		
Turnout		162,958	70.5	▼1.0			
CSU hold	Majority	73,735	45.6	▲8.5			

=== 2009 election ===
Federal election (2009): Rosenheim
Notes:	Blue background denotes the winner of the electorate vote. Pink background denotes a candidate elected from their party list. Yellow background denotes an electorate win by a list member, or other incumbent. A ✓ or ✗ denotes status of any incumbent, win or lose respectively.						
Party	Candidate	Votes	%	±%	Party votes	%	±%
CSU	✓ Daniela Ludwig	82,305	51.5	▼8.8	74,860	46.7	▼8.1
SPD	Angelika Graf	23,041	14.4	▼7.5	20,380	12.7	▼8.0
Greens	Anna Rutz	19,499	12.2	▲5.1	18,258	11.4	▲3.5
FDP	Maximilian Leucht	14,745	9.2	▲5.1	23,226	14.5	▲5.1
Left	Walter Mini	5,967	3.7	▲1.6	7,074	4.4	▲1.9
ÖDP	Josef Fortner	3,905	2.4		2,669	1.7	
BP	Florian Weber	3,612	2.3		2,659	1.7	▲1.0
REP	Gottfried Schubert	3,455	2.2	▼0.3	2,960	1.8	0.0
Pirates					2,503	1.6	
RRP	Siegfried Pielsticker	1,749	1.1		1,602	1.0	
NPD	Elisabeth Götz	1,172	0.7	0.0	1,186	0.7	0.0
Tierschutzpartei					966	0.6	
FAMILIE					926	0.6	▼0.1
DIE VIOLETTEN					455	0.3	
CM					195	0.1	
BüSo	Gerald Strickner	375	0.2	0.0	193	0.1	▼0.1
PBC					149	0.1	▼0.1
DVU					73	0.0	
MLPD					34	0.0	0.0
Informal votes		2,087			1,544		
Total valid votes		159,825			160,368		
Turnout		161,912	71.5	▼6.5			
CSU hold	Majority	59,264	37.1	▲1.3			

=== 2005 election ===
Federal election (2005):Rosenheim
Notes:	Blue background denotes the winner of the electorate vote. Pink background denotes a candidate elected from their party list. Yellow background denotes an electorate win by a list member, or other incumbent. A ✓ or ✗ denotes status of any incumbent, win or lose respectively.						
Party	Candidate	Votes	%	±%	Party votes	%	±%
CSU	Daniela Raab	102,768	60.3	▼2.9	93,811	54.7	▼9.9
SPD	Angelika Graf	37,351	21.9	▼0.2	35,482	20.7	▲1.1
Greens	AdiL Oyan	12,159	7.1	▲0.7	13,437	7.8	▲0.2
FDP	Heinz Benninghoven	7,045	4.1	▲0.5	16,044	9.4	▲4.9
REP	Gottfried Schubert	4,151	2.4	▲0.3	3,079	1.8	▲0.7
Left	Josef Obermeier	3,598	2.1	▲1.6	4,314	2.5	▲1.9
Independent	Roland Hinke	1,741	1.0				
NPD	Uwe Brunke	1,267	0.7		1,191	0.7	▲0.6
BP					1,205	0.7	▲0.4
Familie					1,134	0.7	
GRAUEN					700	0.4	▲0.3
BüSo	Gerald Strickner	454	0.3	▲0.1	300	0.2	▲0.1
Feminist					358	0.2	▲0.1
PBC					280	0.2	▲0.1
MLPD					65	0.0	
Informal votes		2,543			1,677		
Total valid votes		170,534			171,400		
Turnout		173,077	78.0	▼3.8			
CSU hold	Majority	65,417	38.4				
