= Sabine Dittmar =

German politician (born 1964)

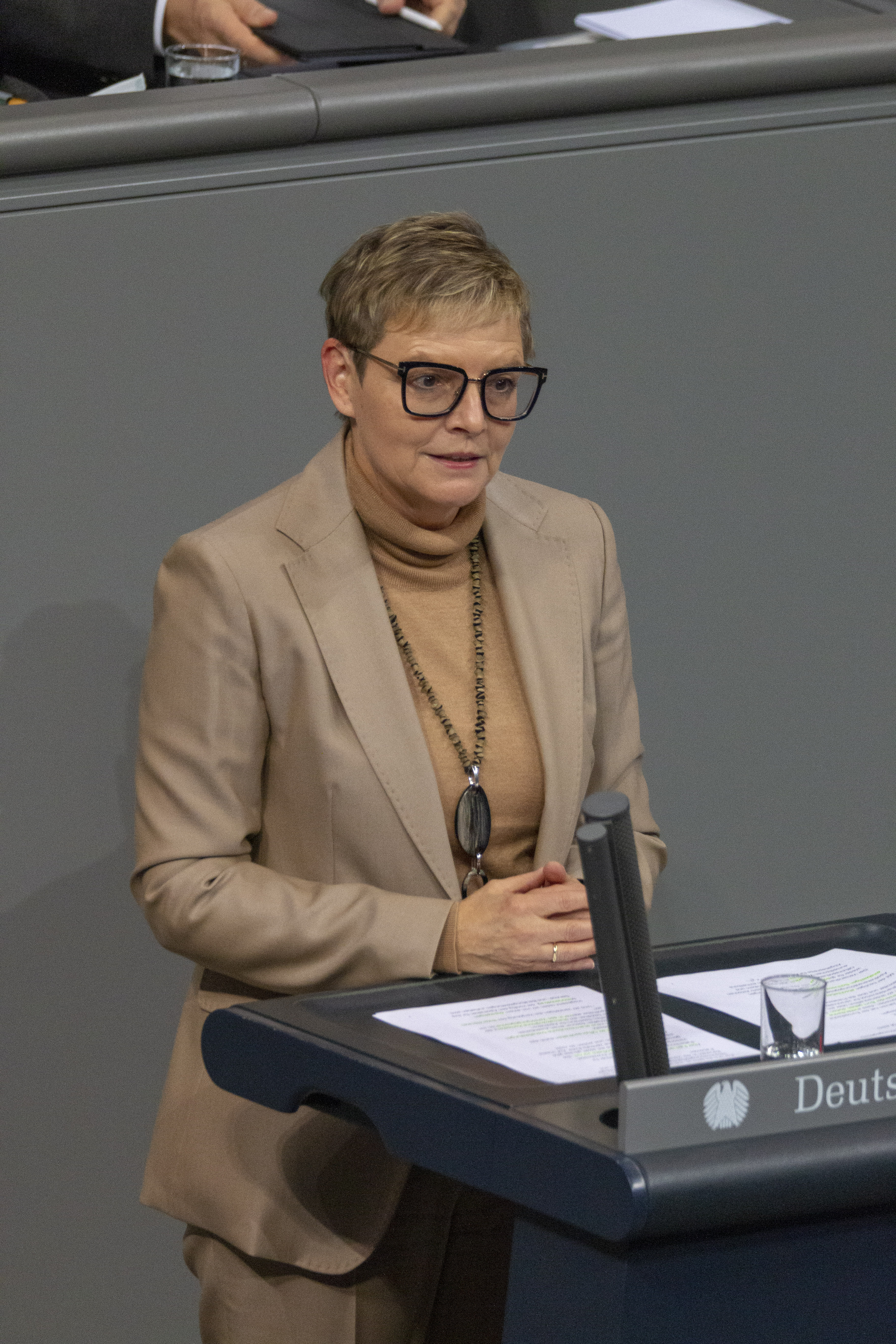

Member of the Bundestag
- Incumbent
- Assumed office 2013

Personal details
- Born: 15 September 1964 (age 61) Schweinfurt, West Germany
- Party: SPD
- Education: University of Würzburg

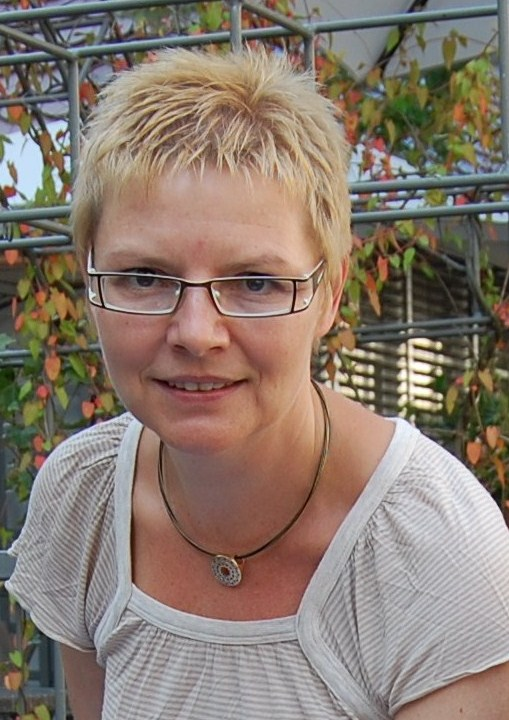
Sabine Dittmar in 2010

Sabine Dittmar (born 15 September 1964) is a German physician and politician of the Social Democratic Party (SPD) from the state of Bavaria who has been serving as a member of the Bundestag since 2013.

In addition to her parliamentary work, Dittmar served as Parliamentary State Secretary at the German Ministry of Health in the government of Chancellor Olaf Scholz from 2021 to 2025.

== Medical career ==
From 1995 until 2010, Dittmar and her husband operated a private practice in Maßbach. Shortly after the outbreak of the COVID-19 pandemic in Germany, Dittmar volunteered at a testing station in her constituency.

== Political career ==
=== Career in state politics ===
From 2008 until 2013, Dittmar served as a member of the State Parliament of Bavaria, where she was her parliamentary group's spokesperson for consumer protection.

=== Member of the German Parliament, 2013–present ===
Dittmar became a member of the Bundestag in the 2013 German federal election, representing the Bad Kissingen district. She is a member of the Committee on Health and the Committee on Tourism. In this capacity, she was her parliamentary group's rapporteur on public health insurance and pharmacies. Since 2018, she has been serving as her group's spokesperson on health policy.

Within her parliamentary group, Dittmar has been part of working groups on the consequences of the COVID-19 pandemic in Germany (since 2021) and health (since 2014).

== Other activities ==
- Gegen Vergessen – Für Demokratie, Member
- German Red Cross (DRK), Member
