= Jimmy Schulz =

German politician and technology executive (1968–2019)

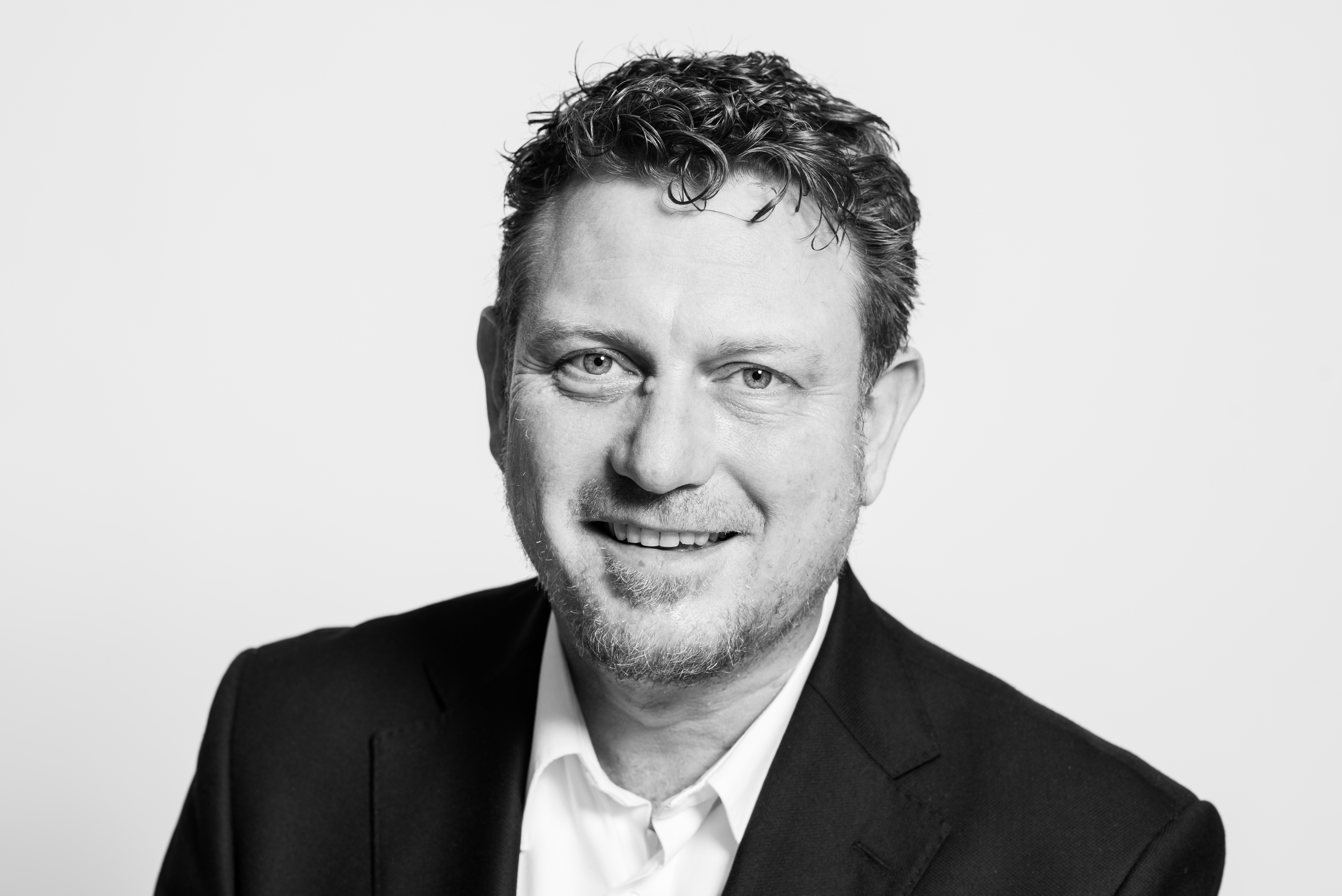

Member of the Bundestag for Bavaria
- In office 24 October 2017 – 25 November 2019
- Constituency: FDP List
- In office 27 October 2009 – 22 October 2013
- Constituency: FDP List

Personal details
- Born: Ralph Jimmy Schulz; 22 October 1968 Freiburg im Breisgau, West Germany
- Died: 25 November 2019 (aged 51) Munich, Germany
- Party: Free Democratic Party
- Education: LMU Munich; University of Texas at Austin

Ralph Jimmy Schulz (22 October 1968 – 25 November 2019) was a German technology executive and politician of the Free Democratic Party who served as a member of the Bundestag from the state of Bavaria from 2009 to 2013 and again from 2017 until his death in 2019. Prior to politics, Schulz founded and sold an internet service provider called Cyber Solutions GmbH.

== Biography ==
Jimmy Schulz was born on 22 October 1968 in Freiburg im Breisgau, Baden-Württemberg. He was raised in Ottobrunn in Bavaria. After finishing school, he spent one year as an exchange student at the University of Texas at Austin. He then entered the Bavarian School of Public Policy.

In 1995, he founded his own company, Cyber Solutions GmbH which was one of the companies that set up the wireless internet service in Munich's English Garden. In 2000, he took his firm public.

In 2000, he joined the Free Democratic Party and began running in local elections in Hohenbrunn. In 2008, he failed to win election to the Bavarian legislature. In 2009, he was elected to the German Bundestag. He served only one term as the Free Democrats failed to reach the five percent threshold in the 2013 election, costing it all of its seats. Schulz returned to the Bundestag in the 2017 election.

As a technology executive, Schulz was active in promoting technology. He was the first member to read a speech from a tablet. He was active in fighting digital rights and privacy issues.

Shortly after his election, Schulz was diagnosed with pancreatic cancer. He died on 25 November 2019 at the age of 51.
