= Daniela Ludwig =

German politician (born 1975)

Daniela Ludwig MdB
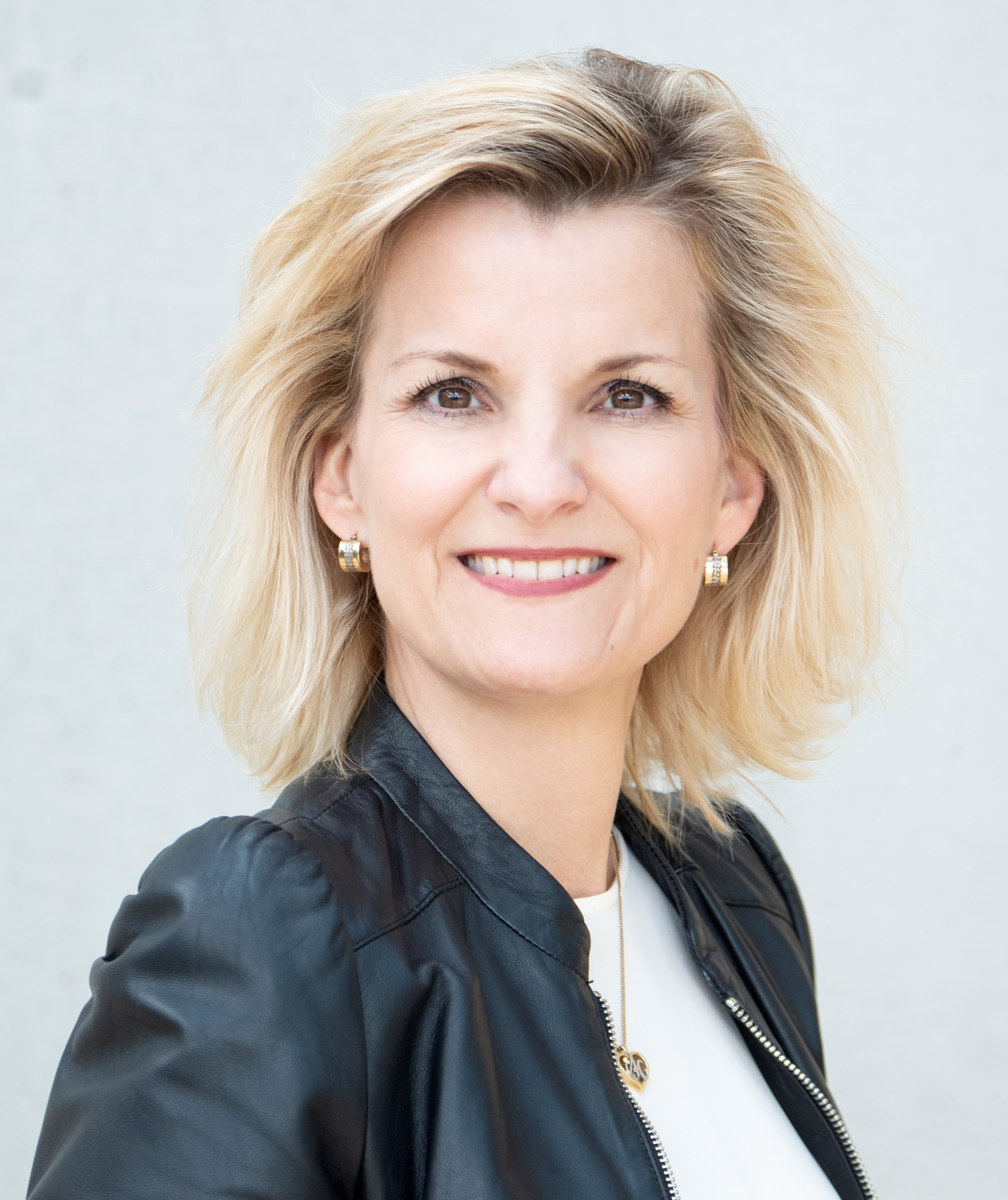
- Ludwig in 2021

Deputy General Secretary of the Christian Social Union
- In office 2018–2019
- Leader: Horst Seehofer
- Preceded by: Markus Blume
- Succeeded by: Florian Hahn

Member of the Bundestag; from Bavaria
- Incumbent
- Assumed office 17 October 2002
- Constituency: State list (2002–2005); Rosenheim (2005–present)

Personal details
- Born: Daniela Raab; 7 July 1975 (age 51) Munich, West Germany
- Party: Christian Social Union
- Spouse: Florian Ludwig (m. 2010)
- Children: 2
- Education: LMU Munich

Daniela Ludwig (née Raab, born 7 July 1975) is a German politician of the Christian Social Union (CSU) who has been serving as a member of the Bundestag since 2002.

In addition to her work in parliament, Ludwig has been serving as Parliamentary State Secretary at the Federal Ministry of the Interior in the government of Chancellor Friedrich Merz since 2025.

== Early life and education ==
Ludwig studied law at LMU Munich until 2002.

== Political career ==
Ludwig joined the Christian Social Union in Bavaria (CSU) at the age of 18. She was first elected to the Bundestag in 2002. Since 2005 she has represented the electoral district of Rosenheim. She also sits on the district council of the Landkreis Rosenheim. Ludwig was deputy general secretary of the CSU in 2018–19. She was the spokesperson on transport policy for the CDU/CSU group.

In the negotiations to form a Grand Coalition of Chancellor Angela Merkel's Christian Democrats (CDU together with the Bavarian CSU) and the SPD following the 2013 federal elections, Ludwig was part of the CDU/CSU delegation in the working group on families, women and equality, led by Annette Widmann-Mauz and Manuela Schwesig. In similar negotiations following the 2017 federal elections, she was part of the working group on transport and infrastructure, led by Michael Kretschmer, Alexander Dobrindt and Sören Bartol.

From 2019 until 2021, Ludwig served as Commissioner on Narcotic Drugs at the Federal Ministry of Health in the government of Chancellor Merkel, succeeding Marlene Mortler. Her appointment was criticised by opposition politicians and activists due to her lack of experience on drug policy. Later that year Ludwig sparked a debate on legalising cannabis, and stated that she wanted to find a compromise on liberalising the prohibition for personal recreational use. At a press conference in July 2020, in response to a question about the legal status of alcohol compared to cannabis, Ludwig's stated that "Just because alcohol is dangerous and contentious, doesn't mean that cannabis is broccoli, okay?" This comment was widely ridiculed online. She also called for a comprehensive ban on advertisements for smoking, including e-cigarettes.

From 2022 to 2025, Ludwig served as chairwoman of the chairman of the Committee on the Scrutiny of Elections, Immunity and the Rules of Procedure. She was also a member of the Committee on Education, Research and Technology Assessment.

In the negotiations to form a Grand Coalition under the leadership of Friedrich Merz's Christian Democrats and the SPD following the 2025 German elections, Ludwig led the CSU delegation in the working group on government reform and cutting red tape; her counterparts from the other parties were Philipp Amthor and Sonja Eichwede.

== Political positions ==
In June 2017, Ludwig voted against Germany's introduction of same-sex marriage. In 2024, Ludwig was elected as her party's spokesperson for "Jewish life in Germany and relations to the state of Israel." In this position, she has expressed her support for the Israeli Government in the ongoing war in Gaza and her adherence to the German concept of "Staatsraison." She supports arms deliveries to Israel.

== Recognition ==
In 2019 Ludwig received the Order of Merit of the Federal Republic of Germany (Cross of Merit) for charitable engagement.

== Personal life ==
Ludwig married Florian Ludwig, teacher and city councillor, in 2010. They became parents of twins in 2011.
