= Anton Besold =

German politician (1904–1991)

Member of the Bundestag
- In office 15 October 1957 – 20 October 1969
- Preceded by: Benno Graf
- Succeeded by: Albert Probst
- Constituency: Munich West (1957–1965); Munich Land (1965–1969)
- In office 7 September 1949 – 6 October 1953
- Preceded by: Constituency established
- Succeeded by: Franz Seidl
- Constituency: Munich Land

Personal details
- Born: 13 January 1904 Weßling, Germany
- Died: 20 September 1991 (aged 87) Oberhaching, Germany
- Party: Christian Social Union
- Other political affiliations: Bavaria Party (1947–1954)
- Education: LMU Munich

Anton Besold (13 January 1904 – 20 September 1991) was a German politician. He was a representative of the Bavaria Party and Christian Social Union of Bavaria.

== See also ==
- List of Bavarian Christian Social Union politicians
