= Bad Kissingen (electoral district) =

Federal electoral district of Germany

247 Bad Kissingen
- Electoral district for the Bundestag
- Bad Kissingen in 2025
- State: Bavaria
- Population: 267,300 (2019)
- Electorate: 210,364 (2025)
- Major settlements: Bad Kissingen; Bad Neustadt an der Saale; Haßfurt
- Area: 3,114.8 km^{2}

Current electoral district
- Created: 1949
- Party: CSU
- Member: Dorothee Bär
- Elected: 2009, 2013, 2017, 2021, 2025

Bad Kissingen is an electoral constituency (German: Wahlkreis) represented in the Bundestag. It elects one member via first-past-the-post voting. Under the current constituency numbering system, it is designated as constituency 247. It is located in northwestern Bavaria, comprising the districts of Bad Kissingen, Haßberge, and Rhön-Grabfeld.

Bad Kissingen was created for the inaugural 1949 federal election. Since 2009, it has been represented by Dorothee Bär of the Christian Social Union (CSU).

== Geography ==
Bad Kissingen is located in northwestern Bavaria. As of the 2021 federal election, it comprises the districts of Bad Kissingen, Haßberge, and Rhön-Grabfeld.

== History ==
Bad Kissingen was created in 1949. In the 1949 election, it was Bavaria constituency 37 in the numbering system. In the 1953 through 1961 elections, it was number 232. In the 1965 through 1998 elections, it was number 234. In the 2002 and 2005 elections, it was number 249. In the 2009 through 2021 elections, it was number 248. From the 2025 election, it has been number 247.

Originally, the constituency comprised the independent city of Bad Kissingen and the districts of Landkreis Bad Kissingen, Ebern, Haßfurt, Hofheim, Königshofen, and Mellrichstadt. In the 1965 through 1972 elections, it also contained the district of Bad Neustadt an der Saale. It acquired its current borders in the 1976 election.

Election	No.	Name	Borders
1949	37	Bad Kissingen	Bad Kissingen city; Landkreis Bad Kissingen district; Ebern district; Haßfurt district; Hofheim district; Königshofen district; Mellrichstadt district
1953	232	Bad Kissingen	Bad Kissingen city; Landkreis Bad Kissingen district; Ebern district; Haßfurt district; Hofheim district; Königshofen district; Mellrichstadt district
1957	232	Bad Kissingen	Bad Kissingen city; Landkreis Bad Kissingen district; Ebern district; Haßfurt district; Hofheim district; Königshofen district; Mellrichstadt district
1961	232	Bad Kissingen	Bad Kissingen city; Landkreis Bad Kissingen district; Ebern district; Haßfurt district; Hofheim district; Königshofen district; Mellrichstadt district
1965	234	Bad Kissingen	Bad Kissingen city; Landkreis Bad Kissingen district; Ebern district; Haßfurt district; Hofheim district; Königshofen district; Mellrichstadt district; Bad Neustadt an der Saale district
1969	234	Bad Kissingen	Bad Kissingen city; Landkreis Bad Kissingen district; Ebern district; Haßfurt district; Hofheim district; Königshofen district; Mellrichstadt district; Bad Neustadt an der Saale district
1972	234	Bad Kissingen	Bad Kissingen city; Landkreis Bad Kissingen district; Ebern district; Haßfurt district; Hofheim district; Königshofen district; Mellrichstadt district; Bad Neustadt an der Saale district
1976	234	Bad Kissingen	Bad Kissingen district; Haßberge district; Rhön-Grabfeld district
1980	234	Bad Kissingen	Bad Kissingen district; Haßberge district; Rhön-Grabfeld district
1983	234	Bad Kissingen	Bad Kissingen district; Haßberge district; Rhön-Grabfeld district
1987	234	Bad Kissingen	Bad Kissingen district; Haßberge district; Rhön-Grabfeld district
1990	234	Bad Kissingen	Bad Kissingen district; Haßberge district; Rhön-Grabfeld district
1994	234	Bad Kissingen	Bad Kissingen district; Haßberge district; Rhön-Grabfeld district
1998	234	Bad Kissingen	Bad Kissingen district; Haßberge district; Rhön-Grabfeld district
2002	249	Bad Kissingen	Bad Kissingen district; Haßberge district; Rhön-Grabfeld district
2005	249	Bad Kissingen	Bad Kissingen district; Haßberge district; Rhön-Grabfeld district
2009	248	Bad Kissingen	Bad Kissingen district; Haßberge district; Rhön-Grabfeld district
2013	248	Bad Kissingen	Bad Kissingen district; Haßberge district; Rhön-Grabfeld district
2017	248	Bad Kissingen	Bad Kissingen district; Haßberge district; Rhön-Grabfeld district
2021	248	Bad Kissingen	Bad Kissingen district; Haßberge district; Rhön-Grabfeld district
2025	247	Bad Kissingen	Bad Kissingen district; Haßberge district; Rhön-Grabfeld district

== Members ==
Like most constituencies in rural Bavaria, it is an CSU safe seat, the party holding the seat continuously since its creation. It was first represented by Gustav Fuchs from 1949 to 1961, followed by Alex Hösl from 1961 to 1980. Eduard Lintner was representative from 1980 to 2009, a total of eight consecutive terms. Dorothee Bär was elected in 2009, and re-elected in 2013, 2017, 2021, and 2025.

Election	Member	Party	%
1949	Gustav Fuchs	CSU	42.4
1953	Gustav Fuchs	CSU	57.9
1957	Gustav Fuchs	CSU	66.7
1961	Alex Hösl	CSU	64.7
1965	Alex Hösl	CSU	69.0
1969	Alex Hösl	CSU	68.2
1972	Alex Hösl	CSU	67.1
1976	Alex Hösl	CSU	70.0
1980	Eduard Lintner	CSU	69.1
1983	Eduard Lintner	CSU	72.5
1987	Eduard Lintner	CSU	68.4
1990	Eduard Lintner	CSU	65.2
1994	Eduard Lintner	CSU	61.6
1998	Eduard Lintner	CSU	56.5
2002	Eduard Lintner	CSU	63.4
2005	Eduard Lintner	CSU	57.5
2009	Dorothee Bär	CSU	53.7
2013	Dorothee Bär	CSU	57.9
2017	Dorothee Bär	CSU	51.1
2021	Dorothee Bär	CSU	39.1
2025	Dorothee Bär	CSU	50.5

== Election results ==
=== 2025 election ===
Federal election (2025): Bad Kissingen
Notes:	Blue background denotes the winner of the electorate vote. Pink background denotes a candidate elected from their party list. Yellow background denotes an electorate win by a list member, or other incumbent. A ✓ or ✗ denotes status of any incumbent, win or lose respectively.						
Party	Candidate	Votes	%	±%	Party votes	%	±%
CSU	✓ Dorothee Bär	87,357	50.5	▲11.4	75,099	41.8	▲4.2
AfD					41,399	23.0	▲12.4
SPD	Sabine Dittmar	25,127	14.5	▼4.5	17,374	9.7	▼8.0
FW	Frank Helmerich	22,295	12.9	▲4.7	8,052	4.5	▼2.8
Greens	Christian Andreas Ruser	10,616	6.1	▼3.4	13,320	7.4	▼1.8
Left	Florian Beck	9,962	5.8	▲3.2	8,239	4.6	▲1.8
FDP	Maximilian Karl Theodor Franz Maria Schenk Graf von Stauffenberg	8,443	4.9	▼2.2	6,462	3.6	▼5.2
BSW					5,247	2.9	
APT					1,261	0.7	▼0.4
BD	Michael Werner Kaiser	6,880	4.0		284	0.2	
Volt					717	0.4	▲0.3
dieBasis					697	0.4	▼1.6
PARTEI					671	0.4	▼0.4
ÖDP	Michaela Elisabeth Reinhard	2,239	1.3	▲0.6	621	0.3	▼0.1
BP					226	0.1	▼0.1
Humanists					112	0.1	Steady
MLPD					34	0.0	Steady
Informal votes		7,630			734		
Total valid votes		172,919			179,815		
Turnout		180,549	85.8	▲4.5			
CSU hold	Majority	62,230	36.0	▲15.9			

=== 2021 election ===
Federal election (2021): Bad Kissingen
Notes:	Blue background denotes the winner of the electorate vote. Pink background denotes a candidate elected from their party list. Yellow background denotes an electorate win by a list member, or other incumbent. A ✓ or ✗ denotes status of any incumbent, win or lose respectively.						
Party	Candidate	Votes	%	±%	Party votes	%	±%
CSU	✓ Dorothee Bär	67,458	39.1	▼12.0	65,063	37.6	▼7.0
SPD	Sabine Dittmar	32,844	19.0	▼0.1	30,540	17.6	▲1.8
AfD	Freia Lippold-Eggen	17,130	9.9	▼0.6	18,434	10.6	▼0.9
Greens	Manuela Rottmann	16,467	9.5	▲2.5	15,874	9.2	▲2.5
FW	Frank Helmerich	14,102	8.2		12,639	7.3	▲4.9
FDP	Karl Schenk Graf von Stauffenberg	12,206	7.1	▲1.4	15,211	8.8	▼0.1
Left	Claus Scheeres	4,475	2.6	▼2.8	4,820	2.8	▼3.2
dieBasis	Marco Garnache	3,783	2.2		3,355	1.9	
Tierschutzpartei					1,862	1.1	▲0.2
PARTEI	Sonja Johannes	2,438	1.4		1,416	0.8	▲0.2
ÖDP	Michaela Reinhard	1,266	0.7	▼0.5	777	0.4	▼0.2
Pirates					558	0.3	0.0
BP					476	0.3	0.0
Unabhängige					418	0.2	
Independent	Michael Kaiser	371	0.2				
Gesundheitsforschung					263	0.2	0.0
Volt					236	0.1	
Team Todenhöfer					206	0.1	
NPD					204	0.1	▼0.4
V-Partei3					162	0.1	▼0.1
The III. Path					149	0.1	
Bündnis C					143	0.1	
Humanists					113	0.1	
du.					109	0.1	
LKR					32	0.0	
DKP					25	0.0	0.0
MLPD					20	0.0	0.0
Informal votes		1,624			1,059		
Total valid votes		172,550			173,105		
Turnout		174,164	81.4	▲2.1			
CSU hold	Majority	34,614	20.1	▼11.9			

=== 2017 election ===
Federal election (2017): Bad Kissingen
Notes:	Blue background denotes the winner of the electorate vote. Pink background denotes a candidate elected from their party list. Yellow background denotes an electorate win by a list member, or other incumbent. A ✓ or ✗ denotes status of any incumbent, win or lose respectively.						
Party	Candidate	Votes	%	±%	Party votes	%	±%
CSU	✓ Dorothee Bär	86,603	51.1	▼6.8	75,788	44.6	▼9.3
SPD	Sabine Dittmar	32,383	19.1	▼0.8	26,904	15.8	▼2.3
AfD	Andrea Klingen	17,753	10.5		19,650	11.6	▲8.3
Greens	Manuela Rottmann	11,980	7.1	▼0.8	11,359	6.7	▲0.3
FDP	Nicolas Thoma	9,534	5.6	▲2.8	15,084	8.9	▲4.1
Left	Frank Hertel	9,071	5.4	▲0.8	10,085	5.9	▲1.4
FW					4,075	2.4	▼0.3
ÖDP	Michaela Reinhard	2,083	1.2		1,089	0.6	▼0.1
PARTEI					1,078	0.6	
NPD					926	0.5	▼0.8
Pirates					610	0.4	▼1.6
BP					494	0.3	▼0.2
DM					313	0.2	
Gesundheitsforschung					283	0.2	
V-Partei³					273	0.2	
BGE					195	0.1	
DiB					188	0.1	
MLPD					38	0.0	0.0
BüSo					26	0.0	0.0
DKP					16	0.0	
Informal votes		1,795			1,300		
Total valid votes		169,407			169,902		
Turnout		171,202	79.2	▲8.0			
CSU hold	Majority	54,220	32.0	▼6.0			

=== 2013 election ===
Federal election (2013): Bad Kissingen
Notes:	Blue background denotes the winner of the electorate vote. Pink background denotes a candidate elected from their party list. Yellow background denotes an electorate win by a list member, or other incumbent. A ✓ or ✗ denotes status of any incumbent, win or lose respectively.						
Party	Candidate	Votes	%	±%	Party votes	%	±%
CSU	✓ Dorothee Bär	88,911	57.9	▲4.2	82,760	53.9	▲6.6
SPD	Sabine Dittmar	30,564	19.9	▲2.0	27,931	18.2	▲3.4
Greens	Hans-Josef Fell	12,127	7.9	▼1.3	9,874	6.4	▼1.4
Left	Stefan Bannert	6,930	4.5	▼3.6	6,946	4.5	▼4.0
FDP	Erhard Stubenrauch	4,391	2.9	▼5.7	7,342	4.8	▼9.1
AfD					4,988	3.2	
FW	Christine Wehe	4,259	2.8		4,129	2.7	
Pirates	Benjamin Wildenauer	3,562	2.3		2,980	1.9	▲0.2
NPD	Horst Fuchs	2,789	1.8	▼0.3	2,018	1.3	▼0.2
ÖDP					1,119	0.7	0.0
Tierschutzpartei					919	0.6	▲0.1
REP					884	0.6	▼0.4
BP					756	0.5	▲0.2
DIE FRAUEN					311	0.2	
Party of Reason					239	0.2	
DIE VIOLETTEN					167	0.1	▼0.1
PRO					125	0.1	
RRP					67	0.0	▼0.4
MLPD					40	0.0	0.0
BüSo					27	0.0	0.0
Informal votes		1,822			1,733		
Total valid votes		153,533			153,622		
Turnout		155,355	71.3	▼2.5			
CSU hold	Majority	58,347	38.0	▲2.2			

=== 2009 election ===
Federal election (2009): Bad Kissingen
Notes:	Blue background denotes the winner of the electorate vote. Pink background denotes a candidate elected from their party list. Yellow background denotes an electorate win by a list member, or other incumbent. A ✓ or ✗ denotes status of any incumbent, win or lose respectively.						
Party	Candidate	Votes	%	±%	Party votes	%	±%
CSU	Dorothee Bär	85,574	53.7	▼3.8	75,708	47.3	▼5.8
SPD	Susanne Kastner	28,487	17.9	▼6.5	23,712	14.8	▼7.0
Greens	Hans-Josef Fell	14,723	9.2	▲3.1	12,475	7.8	▲2.2
FDP	Adelheid Zimmermann	13,592	8.5	▲4.0	22,188	13.9	▲4.6
Left	Stefan Bannert	13,000	8.2	▲3.8	13,717	8.6	▲3.7
Pirates					2,807	1.8	
NPD	Johannes Hühnlein	3,305	2.1	▼0.4	2,504	1.6	▼0.3
REP					1,580	1.0	▼0.6
FAMILIE					1,339	0.8	▲0.1
ÖDP					1,242	0.8	
Tierschutzpartei					804	0.5	
Independent	Helmut Schätzlein	712	0.4				
RRP					703	0.4	
BP					495	0.3	▲0.1
DIE VIOLETTEN					264	0.2	
PBC					259	0.2	▼0.2
CM					196	0.1	
DVU					70	0.0	
BüSo					56	0.0	0.0
MLPD					33	0.0	0.0
Informal votes		2,659			1,900		
Total valid votes		159,393			160,152		
Turnout		162,052	73.8	▼5.7			
CSU hold	Majority	57,087	35.8	▲2.7			

=== 2005 election ===
Federal election (2005):Bad Kissingen
Notes:	Blue background denotes the winner of the electorate vote. Pink background denotes a candidate elected from their party list. Yellow background denotes an electorate win by a list member, or other incumbent. A ✓ or ✗ denotes status of any incumbent, win or lose respectively.						
Party	Candidate	Votes	%	±%	Party votes	%	±%
CSU	✓ Eduard Lintner	98,772	57.5	▼5.9	91,645	53.1	▼10.7
SPD	Susanne Kastner	41,885	24.4	▼0.9	37,654	21.8	▼1.6
Greens	Hans-Josef Fell	10,539	6.1	▲0.2	9,646	5.6	▲0.5
FDP	Egon Stumpf	7,778	4.5	▲1.2	15,888	9.2	▲4.8
Left	Stefan Bannert	7,465	4.3	▲3.6	8,422	4.9	▲4.3
NPD	Ulrich Hertel	4,238	2.5		3,245	1.9	▲1.5
REP					2,701	1.6	▲0.8
Familie					1,194	0.7	
PBC	Richard Martin	1,175	0.7		603	0.3	▲0.2
Feminist					549	0.3	▲0.2
GRAUEN					441	0.3	▲0.2
BP					378	0.2	▲0.2
MLPD					96	0.1	
BüSo					86	0.0	0.0
Informal votes		3,438			2,742		
Total valid votes		171,852			172,548		
Turnout		175,290	79.5	▼3.2			
CSU hold	Majority	56,887	33.1				
