= Stefan Wurster =

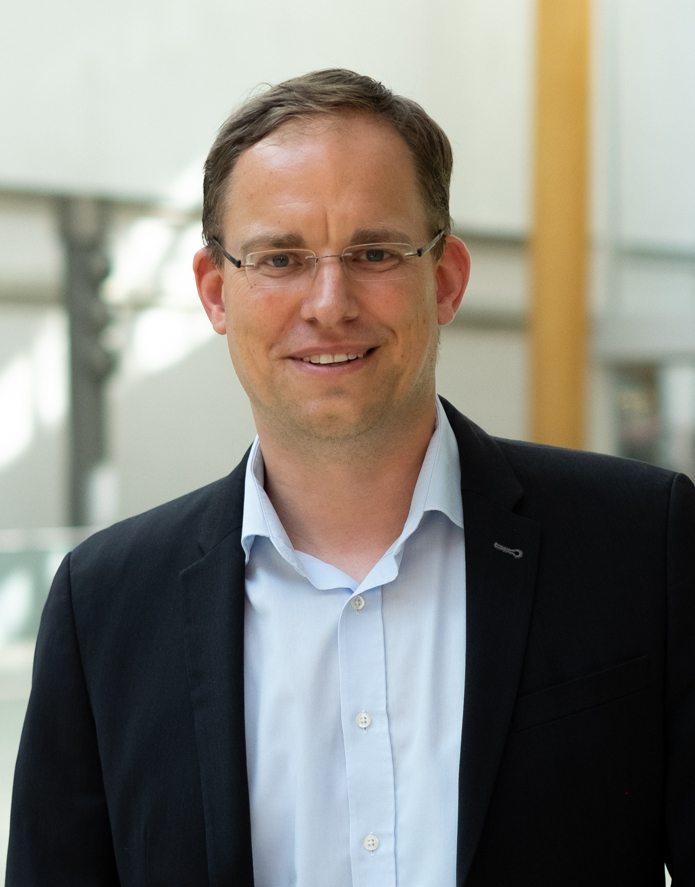
Stefan Wurster

Stefan Wurster (born 1980) is a German political scientist, Professor for Policy Analysis at the Munich School of Politics and Public Policy at the Technical University of Munich and the member of the TUM School of Social Sciences and Technology. He is known for his research on policy analysis in policy fields related to sustainability, democracy-autocracy comparisons, development of party systems and governance structures in energy, innovation, research and environmental policy.

== Education ==
Stefan Wurster studied Political Science, History and Public Law and graduated from the Ruprecht-Karls-University Heidelberg. He received his PhD in Political Science from the Ruprecht-Karls-University Heidelberg in 2010 (Supervisor: Professor Manfred G. Schmidt) and started 2010 his Habilitation on sustainability and regime type (successful interim evaluation 2013).

== Academic career ==
Between 2009 and 2015, Wurster was a research assistant at the Institute for Political Science in Heidelberg. There he coordinated the doctoral program on the political performance of autocratic and democratic regimes from 2012 to 2015. 2015, he became Assistant Professor (W1) for Political Science (focus on policy studies) at the University of Trier. In August 2016, Wurster accepted the position as an Assistant Professor (W2) for Policy Analysis, in March 2024, Wurster got tenured as Associate Professor (W3) at the Munich School of Politics and Public Policy at the Technical University of Munich. Since January 2017, he is member of the TUM School of Governance. From 2013 to 2016 he worked as principal investigator for the interdisciplinary research project Results of the Local Agenda 21 Process in Heidelberg and the follow-up project Determinants of Local Agenda 21 Processes on issues of sustainable governance at the local level. He is the author of over 15 peer-reviewed journal articles, editor of several books and author of one monograph. He was also the editor of several special issues for peer-reviewed journals. His research has been published in many different journals such as Contemporary Politics, Energy Policy, Global Policy, Sustainability, Swiss Political Science Review, Zeitschrift für Vergleichende Politikwissenschaft, der moderne staat, Zeitschrift für Politik, Politische Vierteljahresschrift. In the media, Wurster has commented on the development of the German and Bavarian party system.

== Selected publications ==
- 2010: Zukunftsvorsorge in Deutschland - Ein Vergleich der Bildungs-, Forschungs-, Umwelt-, und Energiepolitik, Baden-Baden: Nomos. (http://www.nomos-elibrary.de/index.php?dokid=155142)
- 2013: Wurster, Stefan (March 2013). "Comparing ecological sustainability in autocracies and democracies". Contemporary Politics. 19 (1): 76–93. doi:10.1080/13569775.2013.773204. S2CID 154149315.
- 2016: Richter, Thomas; Wurster, Stefan (November 2016). "Policy Diffusion among Democracies and Autocracies: A Comparison of Trade Reforms and Nuclear Energy Policy". Global Policy. 7 (4): 541–547. doi:10.1111/1758-5899.12373.
- 2017: Legitimation strategies of autocracies, Special Issue: Zeitschrift für Vergleichende Politikwissenschaft, 2017, Vol. 11, Nr. 2. (Editor with Steffen Kailitz) (https://link.springer.com/journal/12286/11/2/page/1)
- 2017: Das grün-rote Experiment in Baden-Württemberg. Eine Bilanz der Landesregierung Kretschmann 2011-2016, Wiesbaden: Springer VS. (Editor with Felix Hörisch) (http://www.springer.com/de/book/9783658148676)
- 2018: Wurster, Stefan; Hagemann, Christian (August 2018). "Two ways to success expansion of renewable energies in comparison between Germany's federal states". Energy Policy. 119: 610–619. doi:10.1016/j.enpol.2018.04.059. S2CID 158173432.
- 2019: Energiewende in Zeiten populistischer Bewegungen, Wiesbaden: Springer VS. (Editor with Jörg Radtke, Weert Canzler and Miranda Schreurs) ISBN 978-3-658-26103-0.
- 2019: Hörisch, Felix; Wurster, Stefan (8 August 2019). "The Policies of the First Green-Red Government in the German Federal State of Baden-Württemberg, 2011–2016". Politische Vierteljahresschrift. 60 (3): 513–538. doi:10.1007/s11615-019-00170-0. S2CID 202280265.
