= Manuela Rottmann =

German politician (born 1972)

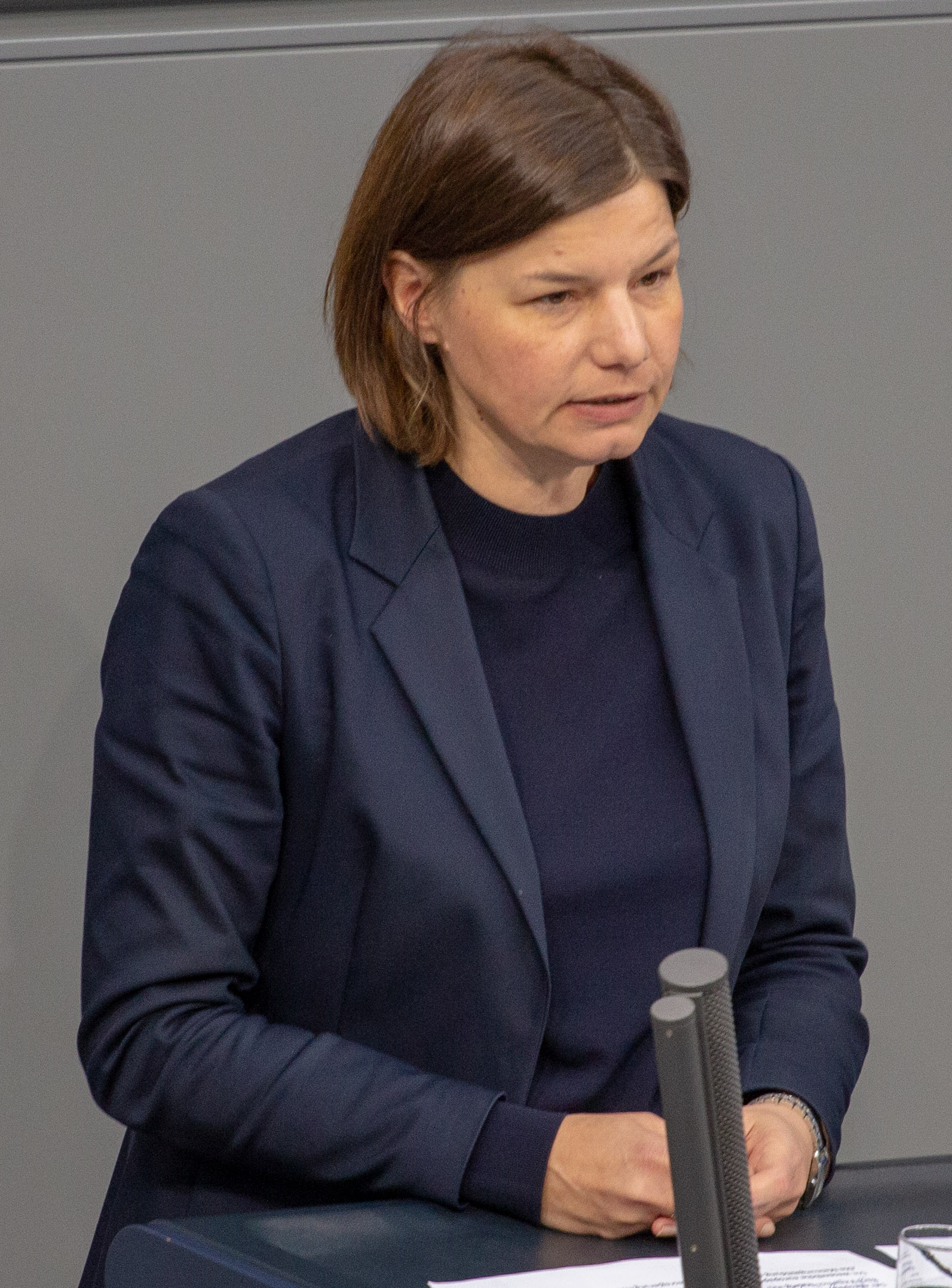
- Manuela Rottmann in 2019

Member of the Bundestag
- In office 2017–2024
- Succeeded by: Uwe Kekeritz

Personal details
- Born: 9 May 1972 (age 53) Würzburg, West Germany (now Germany)
- Party: Greens
- Children: 1

Manuela Rottmann (born 9 May 1972) is a German lawyer and politician of the Alliance 90/The Greens who has been serving as the party's deputy chair since 2024. She previously was a member of the Bundestag from the state of Bavaria from 2017 to 2024.

In addition to her parliamentary work, Rottmann served as Parliamentary State Secretary in the Federal Ministry of Food and Agriculture in the coalition government of Chancellor Olaf Scholz from 2021 to 2022.

== Early life and education ==
The daughter of a police officer, Rottmann attended elementary school in Eßleben and grammar schools in Schweinfurt, Würzburg and Hammelburg. She passed her Abitur in 1991 at the Frobenius-Gymnasium in Hammelburg.

From 1991 to 1998 Rottmann studied political science, sociology, economics and law at the University of Würzburg, Goethe University Frankfurt and Aix-Marseille University. In 1998 she completed her studies with the First State Examination in Law in Frankfurt am Main. From 1998 to 2004 Rottmann was a research assistant at the Institute for Public Law at Goethe University. In 2004 she passed the Second State Examination in Law in Hesse. In 2006 she received her doctorate in law in Frankfurt with a thesis supervised by Georg Hermes.

== Early career ==
From 2004 to 2006 Rottmann was a research assistant at the German Institute of Urban Affairs (DIFU) in Berlin. From 2012 to March 2017 she worked as legal advisor for DB Netz in Frankfurt.

== Political career ==
In the 2002 elections, Rottmann unsuccessfully stood as a candidate in the Frankfurt am Main I electoral district. She was elected to the city council, and from 2006 to 2012 she was the head of department for health and environment.

Rottmann became a member of the Bundestag in the 2017 German federal election, representing the Bad Kissingen district. In parliament, she was a member of the Committee on Legal Affairs and Consumer Protection from 2017 until 2021.

In the negotiations to form a so-called traffic light coalition of the Social Democratic Party (SPD), the Green Party and the Free Democratic Party (FDP) following the 2021 German elections, Rottmann was part of her party's delegation in the working group on homeland security, civil rights and consumer protection, co-chaired by Christine Lambrecht, Konstantin von Notz and Wolfgang Kubicki.

In November 2022 Rottmann was named as the Green candidate for the 2023 Frankfurt mayoral election. After she lost the elections in March 2023, she returned to her work in parliament and became a member of the Committee on Legal Affairs again.

In May 2024, Rottmann announced that she would not stand in the 2025 federal elections but instead resign from active politics by the end of the parliamentary term. She resigned in 2024 and was replaced by Uwe Kekeritz.
