= Markus Blume =

German politician

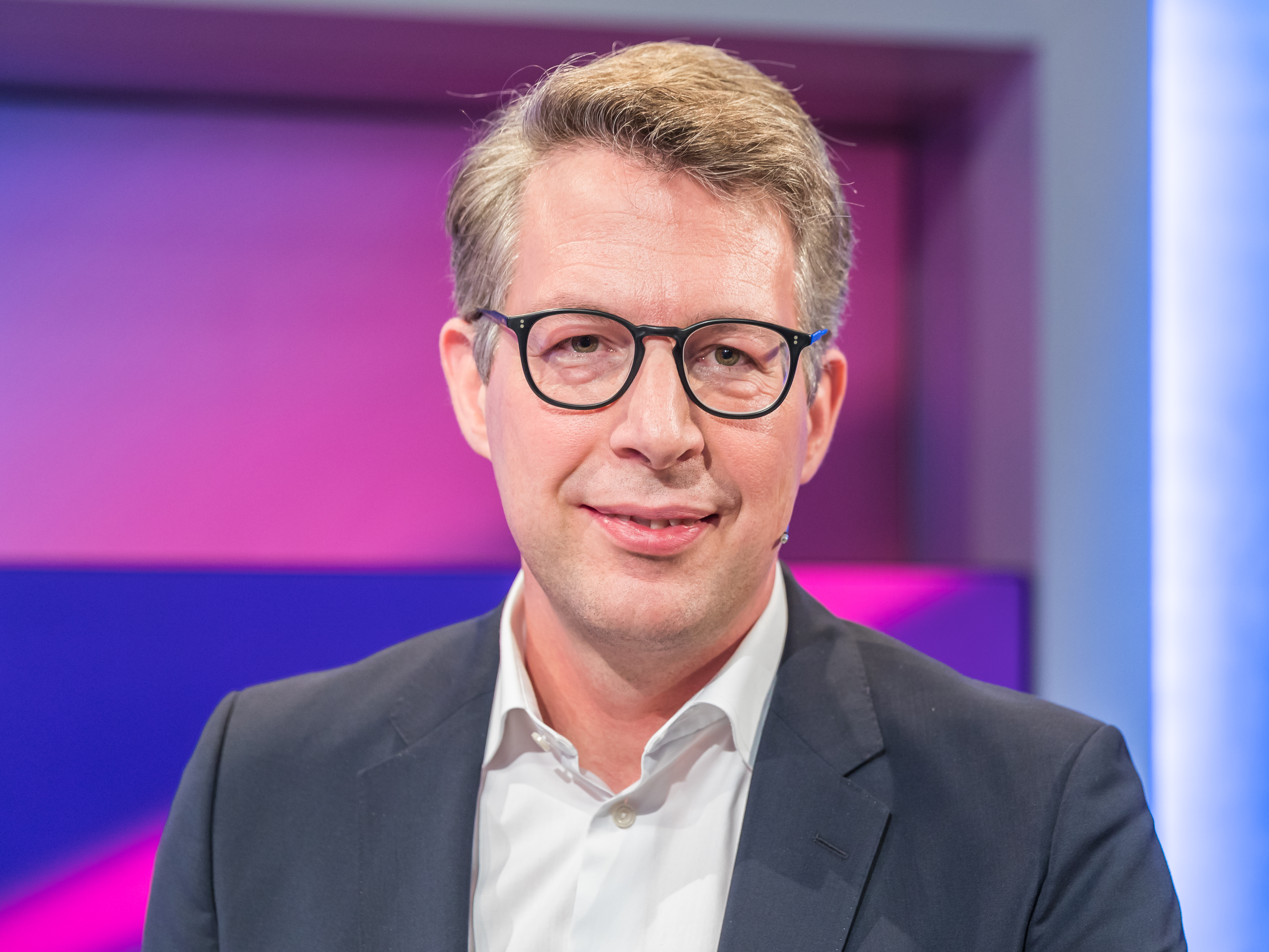
- Blume in 2022

General Secretary of the Christian Social Union
- In office 14 March 2018 – 2022
- Leader: Horst Seehofer
- Deputy: Daniela Ludwig
- Preceded by: Andreas Scheuer
- Succeeded by: Stephan Mayer

Deputy General Secretary of the Christian Social Union
- In office 1 February 2017 – 14 March 2018
- Leader: Horst Seehofer
- Preceded by: Dorothee Bär
- Succeeded by: Daniela Ludwig

Member of the Landtag of Bavaria for Munich -Ramersdorf
- Incumbent
- Assumed office 28 September 2008
- Preceded by: Heinrich Traublinger

Personal details
- Born: 14 February 1975 (age 51) Munich, West Germany
- Party: Christian Social Union
- Education: LMU Munich

Markus Blume (born 14 February 1975) is a German politician of the Christian Social Union of Bavaria (CSU) who has been serving as State Minister for Science and Arts in the cabinet of Minister President Markus Söder since 2022. From 2018 to 2022 he served as Secretary General of the CSU.

== Early life and career ==
Blume was born in Munich. He graduated in political science from the Munich School of Public Policy (HfP) in 1998. In 2002, he founded consulting firm Content5 in Munich. He worked as spokesperson and strategic adviser of Viktor Vekselberg's Zurich-based investment holding Renova Management AG from 2005 until 2008.

== Political career ==
=== Early beginnings ===
Blume joined the CSU in 1995. From 1997 to 2001, he served as chairman of the Association of Christian Democratic Students (RCDS) in Bavaria and was an ex-officio member of the CSU leadership under chairman Edmund Stoiber.

=== Career in state politics ===
Blume has been a representative of Stimmkreis München-Ramersdorf in the State Parliament of Bavaria since the 2008 elections. In parliament, he is a member of the Committee on Economic and Media Affairs, Infrastructure, Building and Transport, Energy and Technology, and of the Committee on Health and Care. Since 2011, he has been serving as chairman of the CSU Business Council.

In the negotiations to form a Grand Coalition of Chancellor Angela Merkel's Christian Democrats (CDU together with the Bavarian CSU) and the SPD following the 2013 German elections, he was part of the CDU/CSU delegation in the working group on digital policy, led by Dorothee Bär and Brigitte Zypries.

Between 2015 and 2017, Blume was in charge of re-drafting the CSU party's new manifesto. From 2017, he served as Deputy Secretary General under the leadership of party chairman Horst Seehofer and Secretary General Andreas Scheuer.

Blume was a CSU delegate to the Federal Convention for the purpose of electing the President of Germany in 2017. In the negotiations to form another coalition government under the leadership of Chancellor Angela Merkel following the 2017 federal elections, he was part of the working group on cultural affairs and media, led by Monika Grütters, Dorothee Bär and Michael Roth.

In 2019, Blume co-chaired the CSU's convention in Munich, alongside Florian Hahn and Thomas Silberhorn.

=== State Minister for Science and Arts, 2022–present ===
In 2022, Blume was appointed as State Minister for Science and Arts. In his capacity as minister, he has been chairing the Joint Science Conference (GWK) since 2023, a body which deals with all questions of research funding, science and research policy strategies and the science system that jointly affect Germany's federal government and its 16 federal states.

In the negotiations to form a Grand Coalition under the leadership of Friedrich Merz's Christian Democrats (CDU together with the Bavarian CSU) and the Social Democratic Party (SPD) following the 2025 German elections, Blume was part of the CDU/CSU delegation in the working group on education, research and innovation policy, led by Karin Prien, Katrin Staffler and Oliver Kaczmarek.

== Other activities ==
=== Corporate boards ===
- RTL Group, Member of the Advisory Board Committee (since 2015)
- KWA Kuratorium Wohnen im Alter, Member of the Supervisory Board

=== Non-profit organizations ===
- Cultural Foundation of the German States (KdL), Ex-Officio Member of the Board of Trustees (since 2022)
- Rechts der Isar Hospital, Ex-Officio Chair of the Supervisory Board (since 2022)
- University Hospital Erlangen, Ex-Officio Chair of the Supervisory Board (since 2022)
- Leibniz Association, Ex-Officio Member of the Senate (since 2022)
- Deutsches Museum, Member of the Board of Trustees (since 2022)
- Evangelical Lutheran Church in Bavaria, Member of the Synod (since 2015)
- Bavarian Research Center for Interreligious Discourses (BaFID), Member of the Board of Trustees
- Eugen Biser Foundation, Member of the Board of Trustees
- Munich School of Public Policy (HfP), Member of the Advisory Board
- Atlantik-Brücke, Member

== See also ==
- List of Bavarian Christian Social Union politicians
