= Gustav Fuchs =

German politician (1900–1969)

Member of the Bundestag; for Bad Kissingen
- In office 7 September 1949 – 17 October 1961
- Preceded by: Constituency established
- Succeeded by: Alex Hösl

Personal details
- Born: 2 January 1900 Pfarrweisach, Germany
- Died: 21 March 1969 (aged 69) Bamberg, West Germany
- Party: Christian Social Union
- Other political affiliations: BVP (before 1933)

Gustav Fuchs (2 January 1900 – 21 March 1969) was a German politician, representative of the Christian Social Union in Bavaria and Bavarian People's Party. He represented Bad Kissingen in the Bundestag from 1949 to 1961. Between 1964 and 1969 he was a member of the Bavarian Senate.

== See also ==
- List of Bavarian Christian Social Union politicians
