= Ludwig Franz =

German politician (1922–1990)

Member of the Bundestag; for Rosenheim
- In office 6 October 1953 – 14 December 1976
- Preceded by: Hugo Decker
- Succeeded by: Hans Graf Huyn

Personal details
- Born: 30 August 1922 Wörth an der Donau, Germany
- Died: 2 July 1990 (aged 67) Rottach-Egern, West Germany
- Party: Christian Social Union
- Education: LMU Munich

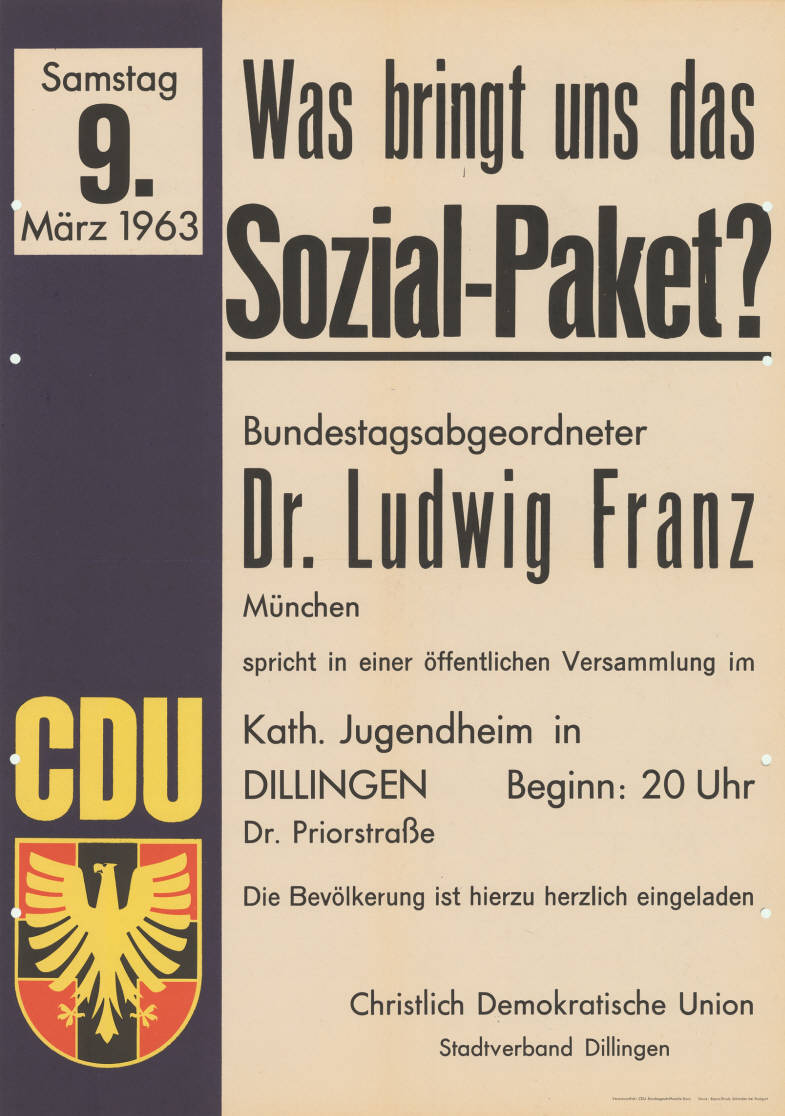
Poster for 1963 talk given by Franz about what the latest social welfare legislation would do.

Ludwig Franz (30 August 1922 – 2 July 1990) was a German politician, representative of the Christian Social Union in Bavaria. He was a member of the Bundestag from 1953 to 1976, representing Rosenheim. He was succeeded in that constituency by Hans Graf Huyn.

Franz obtained his Abitur in 1941, and studied history, economics and journalism at LMU Munich from 1944-49. He worked until 1953 as an editor, first at Donauboten (1949-50), and after at Tages-Anzeiger and Deutschen Tagespost in Bavaria (1950-53).

== See also ==
- List of Bavarian Christian Social Union politicians
