= Finsing =

- Municipality
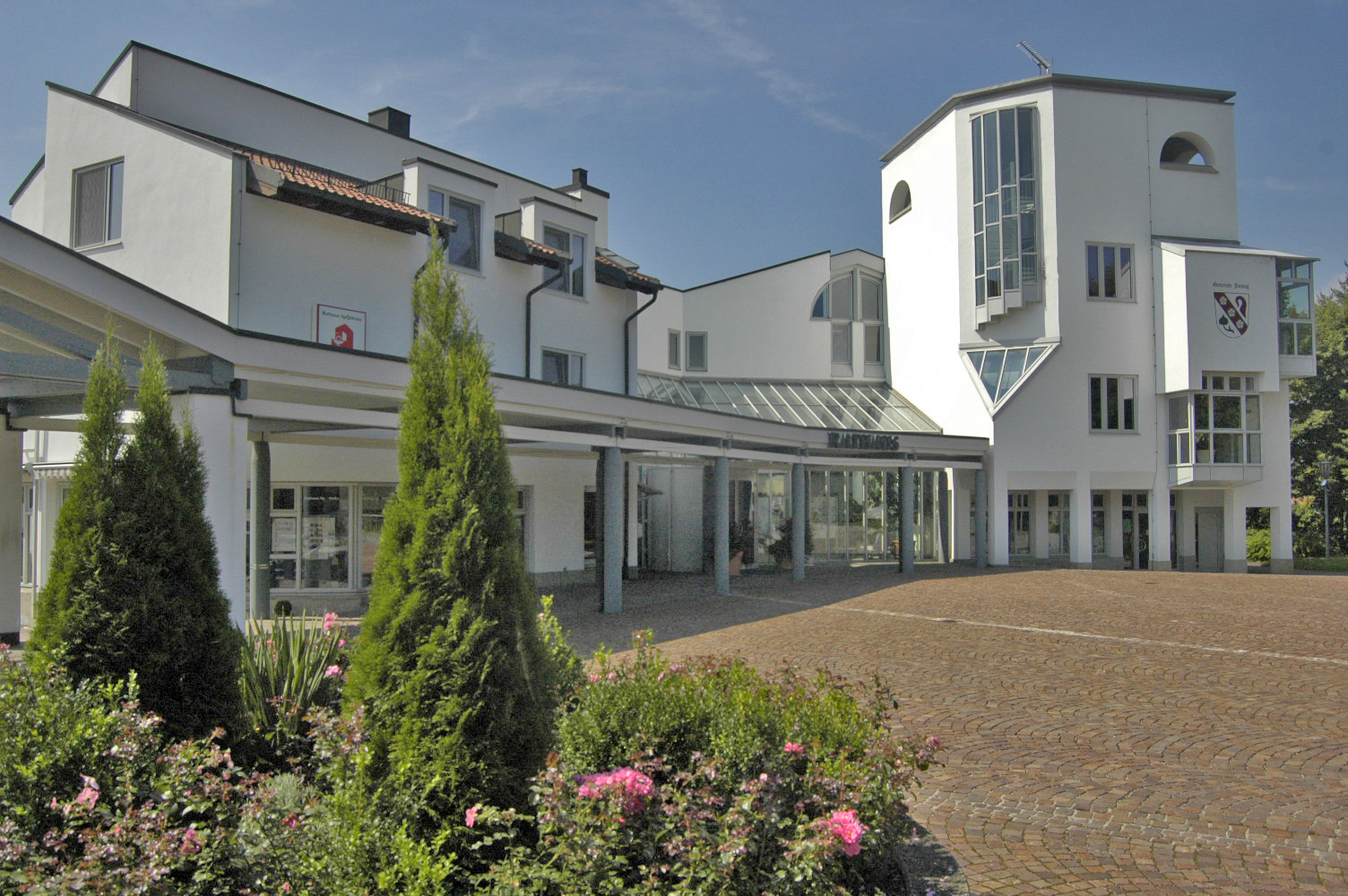
- Town hall

- Coat of arms

- Location of Finsing within Erding district
- Interactive map of Finsing
- Location within Germany Location within Bavaria
- Coordinates: 48°13′N 11°50′E
- Country: Germany
- State: Bavaria
- Admin. region: Oberbayern
- District: Erding

Government
  - Mayor (2020–26): Max Kressirer

Area
  - Total: 23.18 km^{2} (8.95 sq mi)
- Elevation: 480–540 m (1,570–1,770 ft)

Population (2025-12-31)
  - Total: 4,713
  - Density: 203.3/km^{2} (526.6/sq mi)
- Time zone: UTC+01:00 (CET)
  - Summer (DST): UTC+02:00 (CEST)
- Postal codes: 85464
- Dialling codes: 08121
- Vehicle registration: ED
- Website: www.finsing.de

Finsing (German pronunciation: [ˈfɪnzɪŋ]) is a municipality in the district of Erding in Bavaria in Germany.
