= Katharina Holzinger =

German political scientist

Katharina Holzinger (born 1957) is a German political scientist with a focus on international politics. Since 2021, she is the Rector of the University of Konstanz.

== Academic career ==
On 9 December 2020, Katharina Holzinger was elected to succeed Kerstin Krieglstein as Rector of the University of Konstanz.

== Research interests ==
Holzinger's research priorities include national international environmental policy; the European Union; theories of political decision-making; internal conflict, conflict management, bargaining and arguing; as well as traditional forms of governance. She was a member of the Cluster of Excellence "Cultural Foundations of Integration" (2007–2019) and the Graduate School "Decision Science" (2013–2019).

== Publications (selection) ==
- Traditional Political Institutions in Contemporary Politics (ed., with Kate Baldwin), Special Issue of Comparative Political Studies 52 (12), 2019, ISSN 0010-4140.
- Transnational Common Goods. Strategic Constellations, Collective Action Problems, and Multi-level Provision. Palgrave-Macmillan, New York 2008, ISBN 978-0-230-60585-5.
- Environmental Policy Convergence in Europe? The Impact of International Institutions and Trade (with Christoph Knill and Bas Arts). Cambridge University Press, Cambridge 2008, ISBN 978-0-521-88881-3.
- Die Europäische Union: Analysekonzepte und Theorien (with Frank Schimmelfennig, Berthold Rittberger, Christoph Knill, Dirk Peters, Wolfgang Wagner). Schöningh-UTB, Paderborn 2005, ISBN 3-8252-2682-4.
