= Dorothee Bär =

German politician (born 1978)

Dorothee Bär MdB
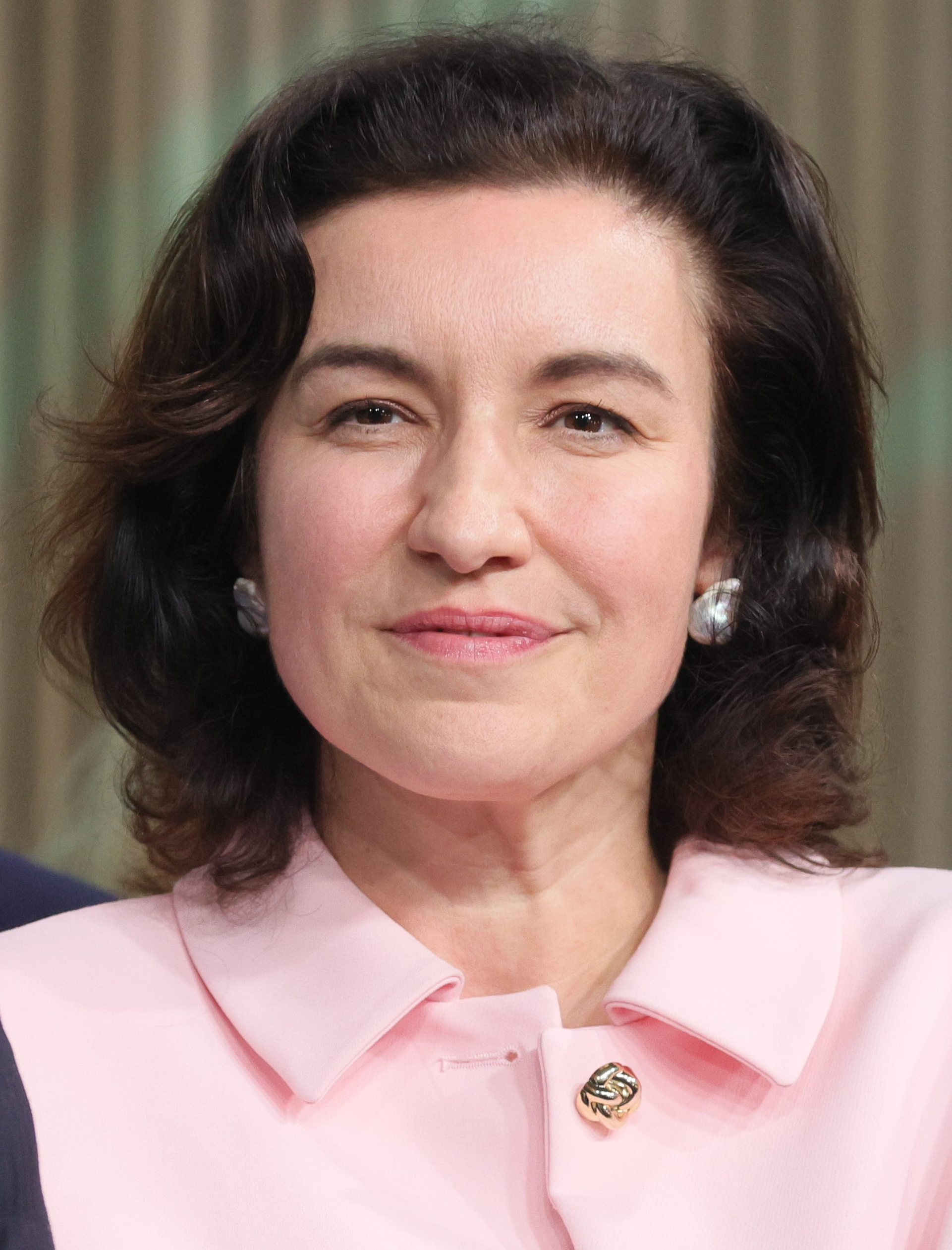
- Bär in 2025

Minister of Research, Technology and Space
- Incumbent
- Assumed office 6 May 2025
- Chancellor: Friedrich Merz
- Preceded by: Cem Özdemir (as Minister for Education and Research)

Minister of State for Digitization
- In office 14 March 2018 – 8 December 2021
- Chancellor: Angela Merkel
- Preceded by: Office established
- Succeeded by: Office abolished

Parliamentary State Secretary for Transport and Digital Infrastructure
- In office 17 December 2013 – 14 March 2018
- Minister: Alexander Dobrindt; Christian Schmidt (acting)
- Preceded by: Andreas Scheuer
- Succeeded by: Steffen Bilger

Deputy General Secretary of the Christian Social Union in Bavaria
- In office 9 February 2009 – 1 February 2017
- Leader: Horst Seehofer
- Preceded by: Joachim Herrmann
- Succeeded by: Markus Blume

Member of the Bundestag; from Bavaria
- Incumbent
- Assumed office 23 November 2005
- Preceded by: Günther Beckstein
- Constituency: State list (2005–2009); Bad Kissingen (2009–present)
- In office 17 October 2002 – 18 October 2005
- Constituency: State list

Personal details
- Born: Dorothee Gisela Renate Maria Mantel; 19 April 1978 (age 48) Bamberg, West Germany
- Party: Christian Social Union (since 1994)
- Spouse: Oliver Bär (m. 2006)
- Children: 3
- Education: Free University of Berlin
- Website: www.dorothee-baer.de

Dorothee Gisela Renate Maria Bär (née Mantel; born 19 April 1978) is a German politician of the Christian Social Union of Bavaria (CSU) who has been serving as the Federal Minister of Research, Technology and Space in the government of Chancellor Friedrich Merz since 2025.

Bär has been a member of the German Bundestag since 2002. From 2014 to 2021, she served in various capacities in the government of Chancellor Angela Merkel.

== Early life and education ==
Dorothee Bär, grew up in Ebelsbach, Landkreis Haßberge where she still lives. She finished high school in Grayslake, Illinois in 1996 and Franz-Ludwig-Gymnasium in Bamberg in 1999.

Supported by a scholarship of the Hanns Seidel Foundation, Bär studied political science in several universities throughout Germany and received her diploma in 2005 from Otto-Suhr-Institut of the Free University of Berlin. After her graduation, she worked as a journalist for several radio stations and newspapers.

== Political career ==
Bär started her political career in 1996 by joining the Young Union (JU), the youth organization of the CSU. In 1994 she became a member of the CSU. In 1999, she became a member of the Board of Directors of the Junge Union for the region of Lower Franconia. From 2001 to 2003, she served as the Chairperson of the Association of Christian Democratic Students (RCDS) of Bavaria.

=== Member of Parliament, 2002–present ===
Since the 2002 national elections, Bär has been a member of the German Parliament representing the Bad Kissingen electoral district (#248) which comprises three counties: Bad Kissingen, Rhön-Grabfeld, and Haßberge. Between 2005 and 2009, Bär was a member of the Committee on Foreign Affairs. Within her parliamentary group, she served as deputy spokesperson for foreign policy between 2008 and 2009, succeeding Karl-Theodor zu Guttenberg.

In November 2008 Bär was elected as the Deputy National Chairperson of the Young Union, under the leadership of chairman Philipp Mißfelder. In February 2009, she became the Deputy Secretary General of the CSU, serving alongside Secretary General Alexander Dobrindt under party chairman Horst Seehofer.

In the negotiations to form a coalition government following the 2009 federal elections, Bär was part of the CDU/CSU delegation in the working group on families, integration of immigrants and culture, led by Maria Böhmer and Hans-Joachim Otto. Between 2009 and 2013, she then served on the Committee on Family Affairs, Senior Citizens, Women and Youth as well as on the Committee on Cultural and Media Affairs.

In addition to her committee assignments, Bär was a member of the German-Korean Parliamentary Friendship Group and of the German-Swiss Parliamentary Friendship Group.

=== State Secretary for Transport and Digital Infrastructure, 2014–2018 ===
In the coalition talks following the 2013 federal elections, Bär led the working group on digital policy; her co-chair was Brigitte Zypries of the SPD. In the third government under Chancellor Angela Merkel, she served as Parliamentary State Secretary in the Federal Ministry of Transport and Digital Infrastructure under the leadership of Minister Alexander Dobrindt. In this capacity, she was also the government’s Coordinator for Freight Transport and Logistics.

=== State Minister for Digitization, 2018–2021 ===
In the negotiations to form a fourth cabinet under Merkel following the 2017 federal elections, Bär again led the working group on digital policy, this time alongside Helge Braun and Lars Klingbeil. Following the formation of the new government, she was appointed to the newly established post of State Minister for Digitization at the Federal Chancellery. Together with investor Frank Thelen she also co-chaired the German Innovation Council at the Federal Chancellery.

Ahead of the 2021 elections, CDU chairman Armin Laschet included Bär in his eight-member shadow cabinet for the Christian Democrats’ campaign; she was the only CSU politician selected for this role.

=== Deputy Chair of the CDU/CSU Group, 2021–2025 ===
From 2021 to 2025, Bär served as one her parliamentary group's deputy chairs, under the leadership of successive chairs Ralph Brinkhaus (2021–2022) and Friedrich Merz (2022–2025). In this capacity, she oversaw the group’s legislative activities on families and cultural affairs.

In the negotiations to form a Grand Coalition of the Christian Democrats and the SPD following the 2025 German elections, Bär was part of the CDU/CSU steering group under the leadership of Friedrich Merz.

=== Minister for Research, Technology and Space, 2025–present ===
Since 6 May 2025, Bär has been serving as the Federal Minister of Research, Technology and Space in the government of Chancellor Friedrich Merz.

== Other activities ==
=== Government agencies ===
- Federal Agency for Civic Education (BpB), Member of the Board of Trustees (2005–2009)

=== Corporate boards ===
- FC Bayern Munich, Member of the Advisory Board (since 2019)
- ÖPP Deutschland AG, Ex-officio Member of the Supervisory Board (2013–2017)
- CNC Communications & Network Consulting, Member of the Board of Experts (2009–2013)
- Quadriga University of Applied Sciences Berlin, (2009–2013)
- Rhön-Klinikum, Member of the Advisory Board (2009–2013)
- RTL Television, Member of the Program Committee (2009–2013)

=== Non-profit organizations ===
- Alexander von Humboldt Foundation, Ex-Officio Member of the Board of Trustees (since 2025)
- Ernst Reuter Foundation for Advanced Study, Ex-Officio Vice-Chair of the Board of Trustees (since 2025)
- German Future Prize, Ex-Officio Member of the Board of Trustees (since 2025)
- Helmholtz Association of German Research Centres, Ex-Officio Member of the Senate (since 2025)
- University of Würzburg, Member of the Board of Trustees
- International Journalists’ Programmes (IJP), Member of the Board of Trustees
- German Academy for Literature for Children and Young Adults, Member of the Advisory Board
- Kissinger Sommer, Member of the Board of Trustees
- cnetz, Member of the Advisory Board
- Total E-Quality initiative, Member of the Board of Trustees
- Wasserwacht of the Bavarian Red Cross, Chairwoman
- Atlantik-Brücke, Member
- 2017 German Computer Games Award, Member of the Jury
- AFS Intercultural Programs – Germany, Member of the Board of Trustees (−2024)
- German Federal Film Board (FFA), Member of the Supervisory Board (2005–2013, 2021–2022)

== Political positions ==
Ahead of the 2021 national elections, Bär endorsed Markus Söder as the Christian Democrats' joint candidate to succeed Chancellor Angela Merkel.

== Personal life ==
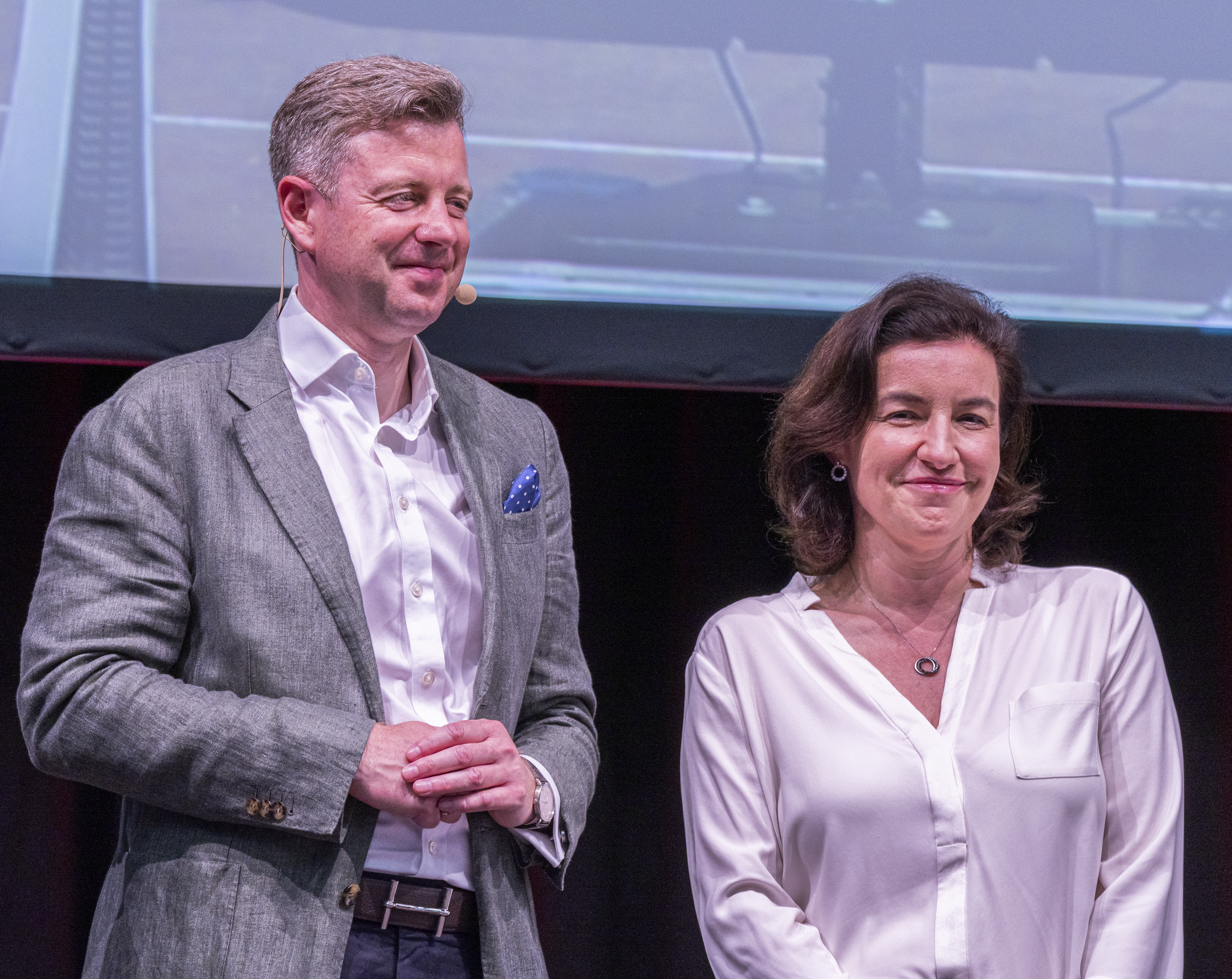
Bär with her husband in 2026

Bär is married to lawyer and fellow CSU politician Oliver Bär. The couple have two daughters and a son.

== See also ==
- List of Bavarian Christian Social Union politicians
