= Antonie Pfülf =

German politician (1877–1933)

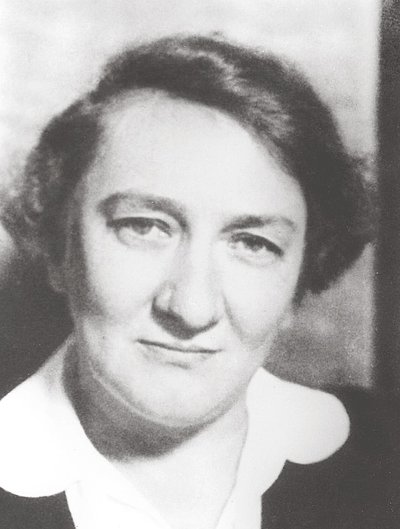

Member of the Reichstag
- In office 24 June 1920 – 1933

Member of the Weimar National Assembly
- In office 2 February 1919 – 6 June 1920

Personal details
- Born: 14 December 1877 Metz, Alsace-Lorraine, German Empire
- Died: 8 June 1933 (aged 55) Munich, Nazi Germany
- Party: SPD

Antonie "Toni" Pfülf (14 December 1877 – 8 June 1933) was a German politician of the Social Democratic Party (SPD). An advocate of equal rights for women, she was a member of the Reichstag from 1920 to 1933 and one of the most prominent women in her party. After the Nazi rise to power, she voted against the Enabling Act of 1933. Refusing to admit defeat and flee the country, she committed suicide in June.

== Biography ==
Born on 14 December 1877 in Metz, Antonie Pfülf was the daughter of the army officer Emil Pfülf and Justine Stroehlein. Against the wishes of her parents, after spending her childhood in Metz, she attended a teacher training establishment in Munich. On receiving her diploma, she taught in Upper Bavaria and from 1910 to 1919 in Munich. While working as a teacher, she undertook volunteer work for orphaned children while calling for educational support for working-class children. As a result, she became a well-known figure in Bavaria.

== Early life ==
Pfülf was born on 14 December 1877 in Metz. Her father was an officer in the Imperial military and her mother was daughter of a lawyer. Her family was wealthy, conservative, and Catholic, and in childhood she and her siblings were attended by a governess and servants. While attending the Higher School for Girls in Metz, Pfülf developed an interest in social justice and the then-illegal socialist movement. After graduating, she trained as a teacher and left home when her parents refused to support her. She taught in rural southern Bavaria from 1902 to 1908, then in Milbertshofen in Munich. Shortly after moving to Munich, she contracted tuberculosis and was treated at a sanitarium. She later moved to a cabin in the mountains to recover further, though the disease occasionally relapsed, forcing her to take a year of leave in 1915.

== Political engagement ==
Pfülf joined the SPD in 1902 after hearing Clara Zetkin speak on women's equality at a conference of SPD women. Though it was illegal at the time for women to engage in political activity, she began attending party meetings while dressed as a man and promoted women's rights. After the ban was lifted in 1908, Pfülf was elected to the executive of the local SPD.

Within the SPD, Pfülf held reformist positions close to the moderate wing, accepting Marxist principles but focusing on concrete political work rather than theory. She was known as a fiery and decisive activist with strong convictions. Her experience as a teacher, during which time she had often loaned money to and bought essentials for impoverished students' families, drove her dedication to political work. However, she was also relentlessly devoted to the party and remained with it throughout the First World War despite her pacifist beliefs. At the beginning of the war, she opposed the party's move to approve war credits, but advocated abstention rather than opposition to avoid accusations of disloyalty.

== November Revolution ==
During the November Revolution, Pfülf involved herself in the discussions and activities of the revolutionaries. Toward the end of the month, she showed up uninvited to a meeting of the all-male Munich workers' and soldiers council. Chairman Erich Mühsam ordered her to leave, but Pfülf refused, declaring: "You'll have to use force to throw me out, because I'm here to represent women's interests." She raised proposals for women's and other social issues, such as unemployment, housing, the spread of illness, and healthcare for women, children, prisoners of war, and wounded soldiers. She also requested that the new provisional government release workers who had been arrested for striking and protesting against the war. Nonetheless, the council narrowly voted to expel her from the meeting.

She was undeterred, however, and soon helped organise the Munich League of Socialist Women, of which she was elected chairwoman. She was largely unsuccessful in bringing working- and middle-class women together, and Lida Gustava Heymann wrote that socialist men were uncomfortable with Pfülf's organising, which "they felt went right to the heart of things and threatened their sense of authority".

== Weimar Republic ==
Despite opposition from Erhard Auer, chairman of the SPD's Bavarian branch and interior minister of the state government, Pfülf was nominated as an SPD candidate for the Weimar National Assembly in the 1919 election. She had sharply criticised Auer for refusing to guarantee women's representation on the provisional council, and he resented her association with the temperance movement. Despite this, her nomination was supported by culture minister Johannes Hoffmann. She stood in the district of Upper Bavaria–Swabia and successfully became the first Bavarian woman ever elected to parliament. In the National Assembly, she was one of 37 women, of which 18 were from the SPD and 3 from the USPD.

Pfülf focused chiefly on women's equality during the drafting of the new constitution. She achieved only limited success, however, since the non-socialist majority had little interest in the proposals of the left-wing women. Article 109 included a vague clause declaring "fundamental equality" a goal of the republic, which dissatisfied Pfülf. She proposed an amendment to explicitly declare that "men and women have the same rights", which was not adopted. Proposals to abolish capital punishment and establish protections for illegitimate mothers and children were also defeated. Protections for female officials and public employees, however, passed.

Pfülf came into further conflict with Erhard Auer over his actions in the aftermath of Kurt Eisner's assassination, and struggled to secure re-nomination for the 1920 election. She retained the support of Hoffmann, however, and successfully won re-election in Upper Bavaria–Swabia.

Pfülf's teaching career effectively ended when she left the Catholic Church in 1919, at which time teachers were legally required to be affiliated with either the Catholic or Evangelical churches. The passage of the new Weimar constitution ended this practice, but the Bavarian government continued regardless. They refused to allow Pfülf to teach again, even after she raised the issue and received the backing of the Reichstag. She continued to argue for over a decade but was unable to overturn the policy. She thus worked as a politician full-time.

During the 1920s, Pfülf became one of the SPD's most well-known members thanks to her activism and speaking ability. At the 1920 SPD conference, she was appointed to a commission tasked with drafting a new party program, and was deputy chair of the women's conference. During her time in the Reichstag, she earned respect even from prejudiced colleagues such as Wilhelm Hoegner, who described her as "one of the few intellectually significant women" in parliament and noted the "energy and staying power" she demonstrated in her constituency work.

=== Women's activism ===
At the 1920 Kassel conference, Pfülf laid out a series of ambitious policy goals to contribute to women's development. She advocated welfare and protections for women and children, improvements in housing, equal pay for equal work, and access to unemployment insurance. She also called for women to speak out against policies such as the death penalty and punitive violence in general, including corporal punishment in schools, believing that this would not only promote political engagement, but that the removal of violence from society would foster a culture of free development rather than motivation by fear.

Ideologically, Pfülf believed that women's equality was an essential step in the struggle for socialism. In 1919, she stated that the biggest obstacle to this was "not the lack of recognition from male comrades, but rather women's own failure to appreciate one another," and that women must "cultivate human dignity in themselves in order to reciprocally appreciate one another and thus make their work easier." She condemned male attitudes toward the women's movement, believing that conservative, bourgeois, and socialist men alike feared female suffrage as a threat to their monopoly on power. In her view, most progressive men still opposed women's advancement on an emotional level, even if they supported it intellectually: "Sexual pride continued to triumph over principle." For this reason, she believed women's emancipation could only be achieved by women themselves.

Pfülf believed that women in the SPD should organise around a set of women's issues and focus on their individual and collective development "from political freedom to political maturity," which would bring about a long-term change in political culture. In her view, rather than separate themselves from the male-dominated political landscape or, conversely, adopt a male approach to politics, women needed to work together to transform politics in a new way. Though progressive in her aims, Pfülf also held traditional views about the nature of women. She argued that women's equality would raise the "heart" to the same level as the "head" in politics, reinforcing the view of women as fundamentally emotional beings.

Her approach was not without criticism, however. The advancement of women within the SPD was painfully slow, and Pfülf typically responded by pointing out the many obstacles they faced within the party. Rather than seek structural and cultural change, however, she continued to focus largely on specific policy issues. The women's movement was thus isolated and failed to reach out to male comrades to aid in their goals, which were left neglected and ignored. By the late 1920s, widespread frustration had built up over the lack of progress for women both within society and the SPD. Pfülf herself was discontent with the situation, but refused to support quotas requiring that women be appointed or nominated in proportion to their total of the party membership. She instead urged women to "get over their inferiority complex" and work as individuals to improve their standing.

Attempts by Pfülf and others in the Reichstag to achieve feminist policy goals were largely a failure. After the rejection of several bills in the mid-1920s, the SPD-led coalition government tried once more to liberalise marriage and divorce law in 1928. Pfülf led a passionate address on this issue. She was repeatedly heckled by right-wing deputies, who shouted that women who desired independence should not marry, to which she said that a smart woman should think twice before marrying and handing all her property to her husband. The conservatives replied: "a woman who loves is not smart, but a woman who is smart usually finds no love!" The attempt to change family law was again unsuccessful.

== End of the republic ==
Pfülf responded emphatically to the sudden rise of the Nazi Party in the 1930 election, championing the social safety net and labour rights which she saw as key to protecting workers from the economic crisis. She spoke often and passionately in defence of the republic and social-democratic policies, but was bitterly disappointed by the SPD's decision to tolerate the Brüning government. She grew weary as the Reichstag's work, to which she had long been dedicated, became irrelevant due to obstruction by extremists and increasing use of presidential decrees.

Losing faith in the ability of the SPD to defend the republic via political means, she placed her hope in the Iron Front. This was dashed in June 1932 when the SPD and union leaders refused to mobilise it in response to the Prussian coup. However, she continued to speak loudly and defiantly in public, even after Adolf Hitler was appointed Chancellor in January 1933. She was arrested in Weiden in February after giving a speech in which she condemned Nazi violence and censorship, ending by reminding the crowd that a recent Iron Front rally in Berlin had brought together 200,000 people to defy the regime.

Pfülf was re-elected to the Reichstag in March despite harsh repression against the democratic opposition. She was disgusted as the Reichstag turned into little more than a spectacle of Nazi power, but was persuaded to attend on 23 March and vote against the Enabling Act of 1933 as a show of defiance. As the situation deteriorated over the following weeks, she helped secure passage out of the country for comrades including Rudolf Breitscheid and his wife Tony, but refused to consider fleeing herself. In her view, this would be tantamount to admitting defeat. She advocated for the party to remain in Germany and resist. Refusing any proposal to accommodate the regime, she opposed a decision by the SPD Reichstag group to back a "peace resolution" put to parliament by Hitler, reportedly "shaking with nervous cramps" while speaking at the party meeting on 17 May.

== Death ==
In private, Pfülf despaired deeply about the situation. Already a week before her speech in Weiden, she wrote out her will and named her sister as executor. As a pacifist she refused to consider violent resistance to the Nazis, and as a democrat refused to placate them as she believed the SPD had begun to do. With political avenues exhausted, she believed that suicide was the only remaining option. Instead of attending the Reichstag on 17 May, she spent the day writing farewell letters to friends and comrades. She attempted suicide via drug overdose on the train to Munich the next day, but failed and was sent to hospital.

Pfülf returned to her home a few days later and received visits from comrades over the following weeks, including Paul Löbe, Louise Schroeder, and Josef Felder. They implored her to join the brewing underground resistance – Löbe told her that "suicide was no different than abandoning the comrades by going into exile" – but she could not be dissuaded. In her final conversation with Felder, she expressed her dismay: "that a great party like the SPD, along with millions of trade unionists, doesn't even try to defend itself — this is what I can't bear." Pfülf committed suicide on 8 June.

Her funeral was held on 12 June. In order to protect others from persecution, she had arranged for the mourners to stand silently for only a few minutes before dispersing, and for only a single short statement to be read: "Antonie Pfülf, born on December 14, 1877 in Metz, died on June 8, 1933 in Munich."

She also asked her sister to publish the following death notice in Vorwärts and the Münchener Post: "On _____, Toni Pfülf returned home. She enjoyed her life and her friends and is grateful to them. She departs confident in the victory of the great power of the proletariat, which she had the privilege to serve." By the time of her death, however, both papers had been banned. Her family submitted the statement to the Münchner Neueste Nachrichten, which refused to print it. Her mother Justine and sister Emma instead published the following notice: "My faithful daughter and my good sister, Frau Toni Pfülf, teacher and member of the Reichstag, died on Thursday, 8 June, and was cremated on 12 June."
