= People's State of Bavaria =

Unrecognized state in Germany 1918–1919

Coordinates: 48°08′N 11°34′E

People's State of Bavaria Volksstaat Bayern
- 1918–1919
- Flag

- The location of the Free People's State of Bavaria (in red) shown with the rest of the Weimar Republic (in beige).
- Status: Unrecognized state
- Capital: Munich
- Common languages: German
- Government: Socialist republic
- Minister-President
  - 8 November 1918 – 21 February 1919: Kurt Eisner
  - 1 March 1919 – 17 March 1919: Martin Segitz (acting)
  - 17 March 1919 – 6 April 1919: Johannes Hoffmann
- Legislature: Landtag of Bavaria
- Historical era: World War I · Revolutions of 1917–1923
  - Established: 8 November 1918
  - Disestablished: 6 April 1919
- Currency: Mark (ℳ)
| Preceded by | Succeeded by |
| Kingdom of Bavaria; German Empire | Bavarian Soviet Republic |
- Today part of: Germany (Bavaria)

The People's State of Bavaria (German: Volksstaat Bayern) (Note: Also referred to as the Freier Volksstaat Bayern (Free People's State of Bavaria) or later simply as Freistaat Bayern (the present-day official name of Bavaria); the name of the state has also been translated as the People's Republic of Bavaria and Bavarian Republic; for further discussion of the terms Volksstaat and Freistaat, see Free state: Germany and Merz, Johannes (1997). ""Freistaat Bayern": Metamorphosen eines Staatsnamen" ["Free State of Bavaria": Metamorphoses of a state name] (PDF). Vierteljahrshefte für Zeitgeschichte (in German). 45: 121–142.) was a socialist republic in Bavaria which existed from November 1918 to April 1919. It was established during the German revolution as an attempt at a socialist state to replace the Kingdom of Bavaria, which had been a constituent state of the German Empire. The government of the People's State, led by Kurt Eisner, promised a non-revolutionary transition to socialism. It delayed discussions on the nationalization of industry but enacted reforms such as the eight-hour workday. Shortly after Eisner's party placed last among the major parties in the election for a state constitutional assembly, he was assassinated by a right-wing extremist. A new government under the moderate socialist Johannes Hoffmann lasted only a few weeks before it was forced to flee to Bamberg in northern Bavaria due to a communist-led coup which established the Bavarian Soviet Republic on 6 April 1919. The coup marked the end of the People's State of Bavaria.

The Bavarian Soviet Republic was suppressed by the German Army with the assistance of paramilitary Freikorps troops in early May 1919. The Hoffmann government resumed power and enacted a republican constitution which made the Free State of Bavaria a member state of the Weimar Republic.

== The German revolution in Bavaria ==
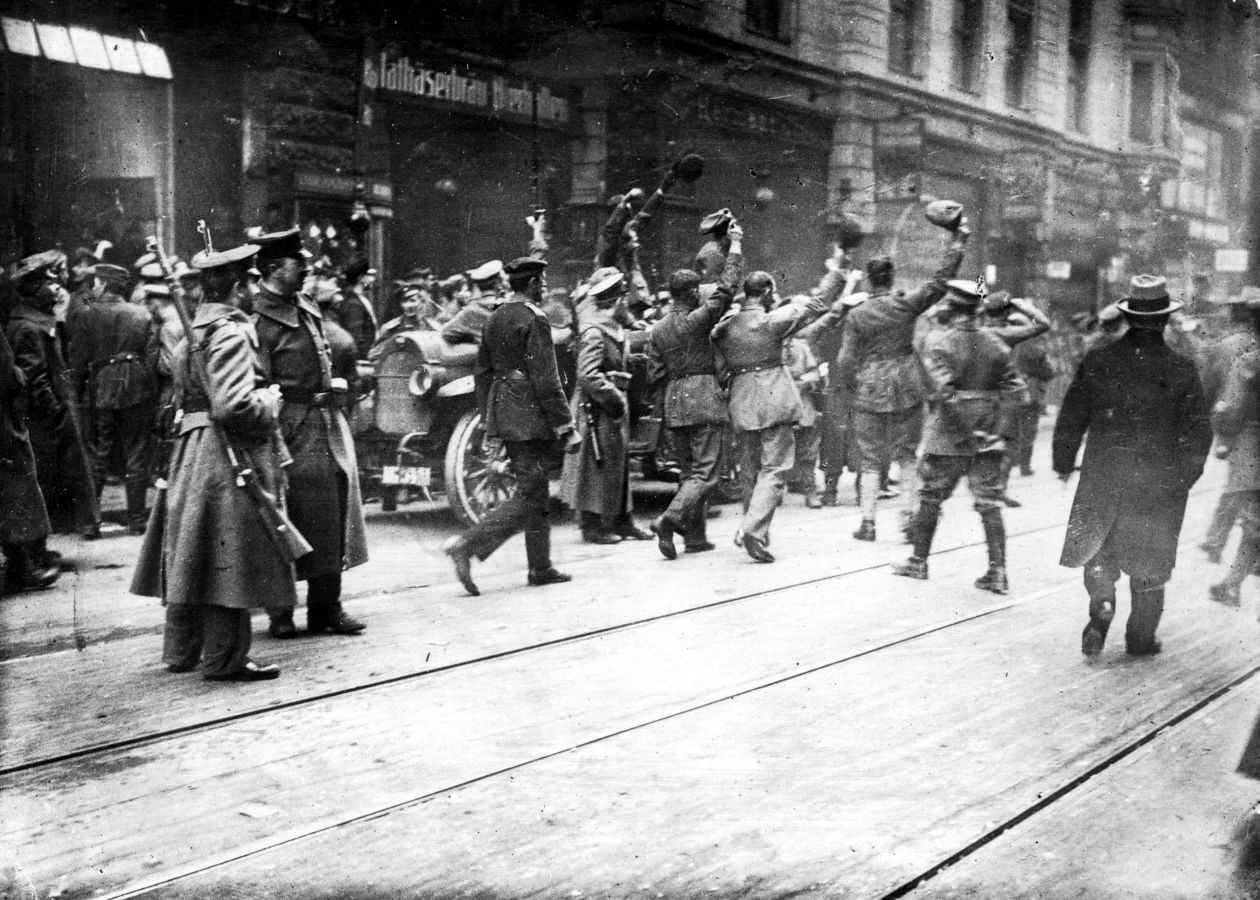
Soldiers in Munich after the proclamation of the republic

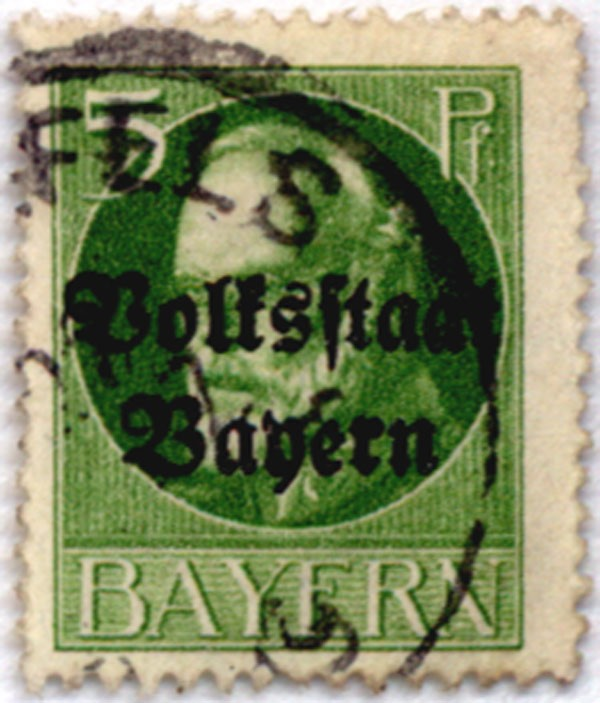
Postage stamp of Bavaria's King Ludwig III with the overprint Volksstaat Bayern (People's State of Bavaria)

The roots of the People's State lay in the German Empire's defeat in the First World War and the ensuing German revolution of 1918–1919. At the end of October 1918, German sailors mutinied off the North Sea coast. After setting up a revolutionary workers' and soldiers' council at Kiel in early November, they quickly spread the councils across Germany and with little bloodshed, took power from the existing military, royal and civil authorities.

In Bavaria, protests initiated by the radical left Independent Social Democratic Party of Germany (USPD) began in Munich on 3 November 1918, the first anniversary of the Russian Revolution. The demonstrators called for an immediate peace and demanded the release of detained leaders. On the afternoon of 7 November 1918, the moderate left Social Democratic Party (SPD), USPD and Free Trade Unions sponsored a mass rally on Munich's Theresienwiese estimated to have been attended by from 40,000 to 60,000 people. One of the speakers, Kurt Eisner of the USPD, demanded the abdications of King Ludwig III of Bavaria and German emperor Wilhelm II, the democratization of Germany, comprehensive social welfare and an eight-hour workday. After the speeches, the SPD led a march through the city, then had its supporters disperse. Eisner, along with Felix Fechenbach (USPD) and Ludwig Gandorfer of the Bavarian Peasants' League used the opportunity to lead a band of about 1,000 to the army barracks in the north of Munich. There they were able to convince the majority of the soldiers to join them. The strengthened group returned to the center of the city where they occupied key locations such as the railway station, telegraph office and the Bavarian Landtag (parliament) building.

That evening, the revolutionary soldiers and workers met in the Mathäserbräu beer hall. As was being done all across Germany in the aftermath of the Kiel mutiny, they formed a soviet-style workers' and soldiers' council. After electing Eisner its chairman, they went to the Landtag building where shortly before midnight, he declared the end of the Wittelsbach monarchy and the formation of the Free State of Bavaria. On the 8th, the newspaper Münchner Neueste Nachrichten printed a statement by Eisner which announced the new Free State of Bavaria and the ouster of the monarchy. It promised to maintain order, hold an election to a Bavarian constituent assembly, guarantee property and retain civil servants.

On the evening of the seventh, King Ludwig became the first of the monarchs in the German Empire to lose his throne when he fled Munich with his family. They went first to his private castle on the Chiemsee and then, after learning of Eisner's proclamation, to the Anif Palace in nearby Salzburg, Austria, for what he hoped would be a temporary stay. On 12 November, he signed the Anif declaration in which he released all Bavarian civil servants and military personnel from their oath of loyalty to him. Although he did not use the word "abdication", the Eisner government interpreted his statement as such. The 738 year dynasty of the House of Wittelsbach thus effectively came to an end.

In Munich, Erhard Auer at the head of the SPD leadership met with representatives of the unions on the morning of 8 November and decided that the best way to moderate the revolutionary forces under Eisner was to take part in his new government. Eisner agreed to work with the SPD and the middle-class parties as long as they accepted the new form of government and that the workers', soldiers' and peasants' councils were the holders of state power. After they reached an agreement, they filled out a list of ministers. It was completed the same afternoon and presented to the provisional National Council (Nationalrat), which was made up of members of the pre-revolutionary Landtag and of the workers', soldiers' and peasants' councils. The National Council had little function other than to give the new government a veneer of legitimacy.

== Eisner government ==
Kurt Eisner, the Minister-President of the People's State of Bavaria

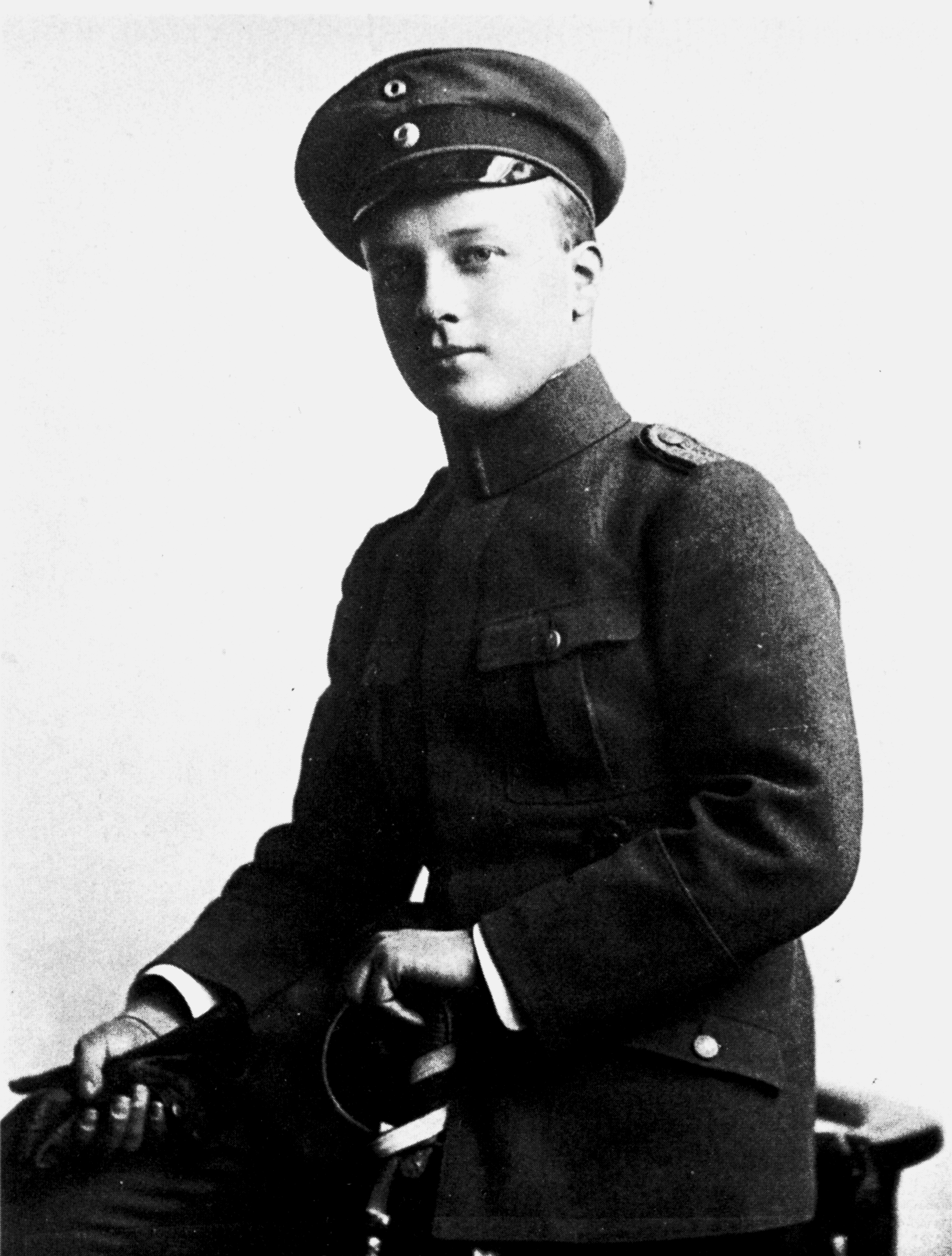
Anton Graf von Arco auf Valley, the man who assassinated Kurt Eisner

Kurt Eisner was a middle-class Jew who had been a drama critic in Berlin before he left his wife and family to go to Munich, where he took up with a female journalist, frequented the cafés of the Schwabing district, and wrote reviews for the Münchener Post. He later lost his job because he was part of the "revisionist right-wing" of the Social Democratic Party, which wanted the party to drop its attachment to Marxist ideology.

Eisner helped found the Munich branch of the Independent Social Democratic Party and became known for his anti-war stance, which had earned him eight months in jail after he organized a number of peace strikes in January 1918. He was released under a general amnesty in October 1918. Despite his gift for rhetoric and oratory, Eisner had no political or administrative experience when he became minister-president.

The Eisner government consisted of:

| Portfolio | Minister | Took office | Left office | Party |
|---|---|---|---|---|
| Minister-President | Kurt Eisner | 8 November 1918 | 17 March 1919 | USPD |
| Vice President | Johannes Hoffmann | 8 November 1918 | 17 March 1919 | SPD |
| Finance | Edgar Jaffé | 8 November 1918 | 17 March 1919 | Independent |
| Foreign Affairs | Kurt Eisner | 8 November 1918 | 17 March 1919 | USPD |
| Culture | Johannes Hoffmann | 8 November 1918 | 17 March 1919 | SPD |
| Interior | Erhard Auer | 8 November 1918 | 17 March 1919 | SPD |
| Justice | Johannes Timm | 8 November 1918 | 17 March 1919 | SPD |
| Transportation | Heinrich von Frauendorfer | 8 November 1918 | 17 March 1919 | Independent |
| Military Affairs | Albert Roßhaupter | 8 November 1918 | 17 March 1919 | SPD |
| Social Welfare | Hans Unterleitner | 8 November 1918 | 17 March 1919 | USPD |

Although he advocated a socialist republic, Eisner distanced himself from the Russian Bolsheviks, declaring that his government would protect property rights. It put off large-scale issues such as nationalization of industries but enacted an eight-hour workday and gave women the right to vote. On 7 January 1919, a Provisional State Constitution was promulgated.

The new republic started out with many strikes against it. None of its leaders was a native Bavarian, and they were bohemians and intellectuals – many of them Jewish – who were conspicuous in their anti-bourgeois attitude. Those on the right wing called Eisner a "foreign, racially alien vagabond" and a Bolshevist, and his associates "unscrupulous alien scoundrels", "Jewish rascals" and "misleaders of labor". Eisner did not help matters by declaring that his regime would have "government by kindness" and would create a "realm of light, beauty and reason." There were frequent spectacles such as parades, demonstrations, concerts and speeches, but the regime's philosophical utopianism won over few converts. Eisner even admitted German guilt for World War I at a socialist conference in Bern, Switzerland and, with his secretary Felix Fechenbach, published papers from the official archives of Bavaria which showed German complicity in the Austrian ultimatum to Serbia in July 1914 after the assassination of Archduke Ferdinand. Even cabinet ministers were dissatisfied with Eisner's leadership. One of them told him "You are an anarchist [...] You are no statesman, you are a fool [...] We are being ruined by bad management." An organized campaign for Eisner's removal from office was not long in coming.

The new government never won any significant support in the conservative Bavarian countryside, and it was unable to provide basic services. Eisner's USPD was defeated in the January 1919 election, coming in sixth place, with only 2,5% of the vote, and only winning three seats in the Bavarian Parliament (the Landtag), while the Bavarian People's Party won 66 seats. Eisner, apparently because he was loath to give up power, delayed calling the Landtag into session until forced to by public pressure from all quarters, including a death threat from the Thule Society if he did not give up his office. Finally, he set the legislature to meet on 21 February 1919, more than a month after the election.

As he was on his way to the Landtag to announce his resignation, Eisner was shot and killed by the right-wing nationalist Anton Graf von Arco auf Valley, an aristocratic former cavalryman who was then a student at the Ludwig-Maximilians-Universität München (LMU Munich). He believed in the "stab-in-the-back myth", which held that Jews, socialists and other "undesirable elements" had caused Germany to lose World War I. As a Jew, a socialist, a bohemian and a Berliner, Eisner was the perfect target. After the shooting, Arco-Valley was saved from lynching on the spot by the fast action of Eisner's secretary, Felix Fechenbach. He was arrested and taken to Stadelheim Prison where, coincidentally, he was put in the same cell that Eisner had served time in earlier.

== After the assassination ==
Despite the assassination, the Landtag convened as scheduled, and Erhard Auer, the leader of the Social Democrats and the Minister of the Interior in Eisner's government, began to eulogize Eisner, but rumours had already begun to spread that Auer was behind the assassination. Acting on the false allegations, Alois Lindner, a butcher, waiter and member of the Revolutionary Workers' Council who was a fervent supporter of Eisner, shot Auer twice with a rifle, seriously wounding him. It prompted other armed Eisner supporters to open fire, killing one delegate from the Centre Party and provoking nervous breakdowns in at least two ministers. For the next month, there was effectively no government in Bavaria.

The events caused unrest and lawlessness in Bavaria, and a general strike was proclaimed by the workers' and soldiers' councils, which distributed guns and ammunition. The assassination of Eisner created a martyr for the leftist cause and prompted demonstrations, the closing of the Ludwig-Maximilians-Universität München, the kidnapping of aristocrats and the forced pealing of church bells. "Revenge for Eisner" rang through bullhorns in the streets. The support for the Left was greater than ever before, even greater than Eisner himself had been able to win.

== Hoffmann government and end of the People's State ==
A general meeting of Munich councils on 22 February 1919 elected a Bavarian Central Council under the leadership of Ernst Niekisch (SPD) with representatives from the SPD, USPD, Communist Party of Germany (KPD) and peasants' councils. On 28 February, the Central Council called a congress of Bavarian councils at which the SPD refused to take part in a proposed provisional government. It insisted that a government could be legitimate only if backed by elected representatives of the people. The members of the constituent assembly (Landtag) were then called back into session and met for just the second time on 17 March. They chose Johannes Hoffmann of the SPD, an anti-militarist and former schoolteacher, to be minister-president. He then formed a minority cabinet consisting of four members from the SPD, two from the USPD, two independents and one from the Peasants' League.

The government consisted of:

| Portfolio | Minister | Took office | Left office | Party |
|---|---|---|---|---|
| Minister-President | Johannes Hoffmann | 17 March 1919 | 31 May 1919 | SPD |
| Finance | Karl Neumaier | 25 March 1919 | 12 April 1919 | Independent |
| Finance | Sigmund Haller von Hallerstein (acting) | 12 April 1919 | 31 May 1919 | SPD |
| Foreign Affairs | Johannes Hoffmann | 17 March 1919 | 31 May 1919 | SPD |
| Culture | Johannes Hoffmann | 17 March 1919 | 31 May 1919 | SPD |
| Interior | Martin Segitz | 17 March 1919 | 31 May 1919 | SPD |
| Justice | Fritz Endres | 17 March 1919 | 31 May 1919 | SPD |
| Transportation | Heinrich von Frauendorfer | 17 March 1919 | 31 May 1919 | Independent |
| Military Affairs | Ernst Schneppenhorst | 17 March 1919 | 31 May 1919 | SPD |
| Social Welfare | Hans Unterleitner | 17 March 1919 | 12 April 1919 | USPD |
| Social Welfare | Hans Gasteiger (acting) | 12 April 1919 | 31 May 1919 | SPD |
| Trade, Industry and Commerce | Josef Simon | 17 March 1919 | 7 April 1919 | USPD |
| Trade, Industry and Commerce | Martin Segitz (acting) | 7 April 1919 | 31 May 1919 | SPD |
| Agriculture | Martin Steiner | 17 March 1919 | 31 May 1919 | BB |

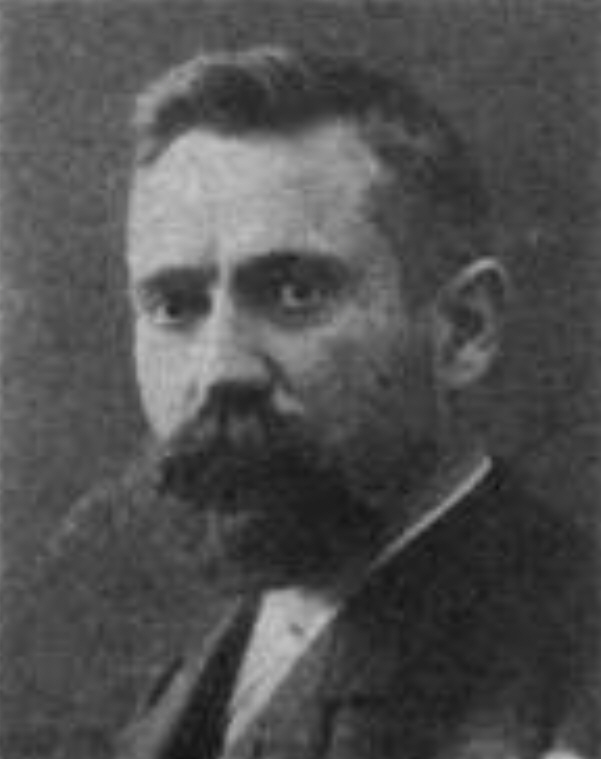
Johannes Hoffmann. He took over leadership of the People's State after Eisner was assassinated.

On the night of 6–7 April, communists and anarchists, energized by the news of a communist revolution in Hungary, declared a Bavarian Soviet Republic, with the playwright Ernst Toller as chief of state. The Hoffmann government fled to Bamberg in northern Bavaria. The coup and flight of the government marked the end of the People's State of Bavaria.

In early May 1919, the Bavarian Soviet Republic was brutally crushed by the German Army with assistance from paramilitary Freikorps units. Over 600 people, many of them innocent civilians, were killed in the White Terror that followed. The Hoffmann government was rebuilt and returned from Bamberg on 17 August. The republican Free State of Bavaria was established as one of the constituent states of the Weimar Republic on 15 September when the so-called Bamberg Constitution went into effect.

== See also ==
- Aftermath of World War I
- German Revolution of 1918–19
- History of Bavaria
- Bavarian Soviet Republic
- Free State of Bavaria (Weimar Republic)
