= Franz Matt =

German politician (1860–1929)

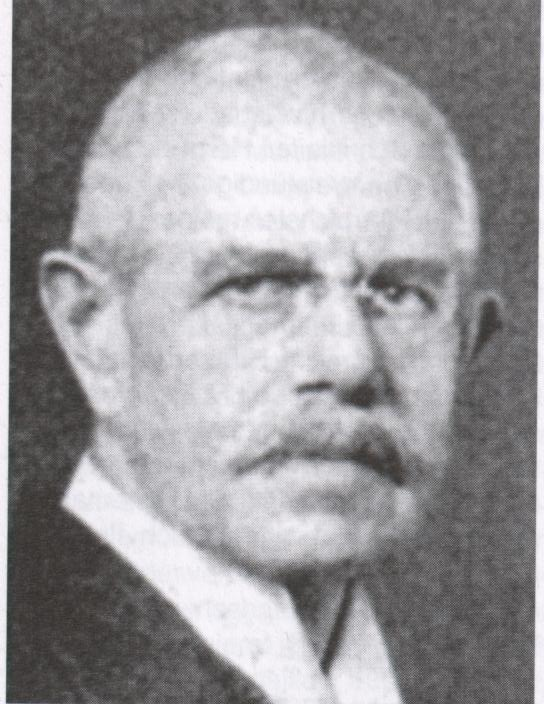
Minister Franz Matt

Franz Matt (9 September 1860 in Offenbach an der Queich, Kingdom of Bavaria – 4 August 1929 in Munich) was a German lawyer, politician and minister, who belonged to the Bavarian People's Party (BVP). Following the revolution, he substantially defined and put through Bavarian cultural and educational policy.

== Life ==
Franz Matt studied law at the Ludwig-Maximilians-Universität München and at Leipzig University. In Munich, he became a member of the Catholic fraternity, Katholische Deutsche Studentenverbindung Aenania München, in the Cartellverband der katholischen deutschen Studentenverbindungen (or Cartellverband, CV). Later, he also became a member of the fraternity, Katholische Deutsche Studentenverbindung Markomannia Würzburg in the CV. After he received his doctorate degree, he held several offices in the Bavarian civil service. As the Ministerial Director of the Interior Ministry for Cultural and School Affairs (Ministerialdirektor des Staatsministeriums des Inneren für Kultur- und Schulangelegenheiten), he experienced the overthrow of the Bavarian monarchy. Cooperation with the new Minister of Education and the Arts (Kultusminister) of the Bavarian Republic, Johannes Hoffmann (SPD), appointed by Kurt Eisner, appeared to be extremely difficult, since Franz Matt rejected Hoffman's school reforms.

As a result, Matt became involved in the newly founded Bavarian People's Party (Bayerische Volkspartei or BVP) and in 1920, after the resignation of Johannes Hoffmann as Prime Minister, he was named Minister of Education and the Arts by the new Prime Minister, Gustav Ritter von Kahr of the BVP.

In the period following, Franz Matt pursued a comprehensive course correction with regard to school policies and reformed the entire system of higher education in Bavaria. He developed the Bavarian policies regarding the arts and created the prerequisites for a revision of the relations between the state and the church. The concordat with the Holy See from 1923, as well as the treaties with the established Evangelical churches in the state of Bavaria can be substantially traced back even today to the determined policies of Matt.

During the Beer Hall Putsch of 9 November 1923, Franz Matt was the only member of the Bavarian State cabinet not present. At the time of the putsch, he was having dinner with Cardinal Michael von Faulhaber, the Archbishop of Munich and the Nuncio to Bavaria, Monsignor Eugenio Pacelli, the future pope Pius XII. When informed of the coup, he as the Vice Prime Minister organized a government-in-exile at Regensburg and called on the police, military, and other public servants to support the government, which effectively doomed the prospects of the putschists.

Matt was engaged in the Catholic lay movement. He was honored with numerous awards and several honorary doctorates.

== Literature ==
- Lydia Schmidt: Kultusminister Franz Matt (1920-1926): Schul-, Kirchen- und Kunstpolitik in Bayern nach dem Umbruch von 1918. (Schriftenreihe zur bayerischen Landesgeschichte)" C.H. Beck 2000, ISBN 3-406-10707-9
