= Martin Segitz =

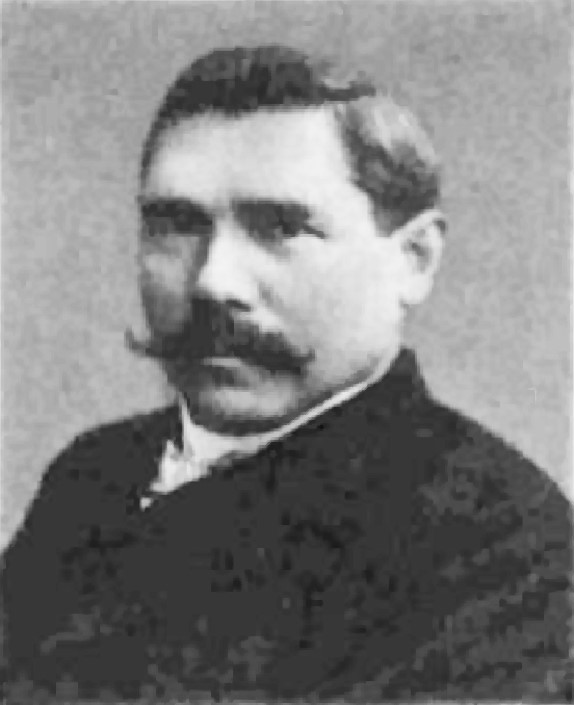

Acting Minister President of Bavaria
- In office 1 March 1919 – 17 March 1919
- Preceded by: Kurt Eisner
- Succeeded by: Johannes Hoffmann

Personal details
- Born: July 26, 1853 Fürth
- Died: July 31, 1927 (aged 74) Fürth
- Party: Social Democratic Party of Germany

Martin Segitz (26 July 1853 – 31 July 1927) was an acting Bavarian Minister-President and member of the SPD.

== Biography ==
Martin Segitz was born in Fürth in 1853, in what was then the independent Kingdom of Bavaria.

After originally working in the tin industry, in 1890 he became an editor for the Fränkische Tagespost newspaper in Nuremberg. He engaged himself in the workers movement and became a member of the SPD. From 1897 to 1927, he was a member of the Bavarian parliament, the Landtag. He also served as a member of the German Reichstag from 1898 to 1903 and again from 1912 to 1918.

He was also a member of the council of the city of Fürth for 25 years. He formed a workers library in Nuremberg, which was then the biggest in Germany. Segitz also had a large part in the formation of the first metal worker union in Germany.

After World War I, he became a state commissioner for the demobilizing of the home coming troops of the Bavarian army.

After the assassination of Kurt Eisner, Segitz became for a short time, from 1 March to 17 March 1919, the acting prime minister of Bavaria. Due to the political turmoil at this stage, his government, and initially the following one under Johannes Hoffmann too, had little control and was not universally recognized in Bavaria.

After these events, he served as the Minister of the Interior and Minister of Commerce, Industry and Trade under the Hoffmann government in 1919. He held the position of Minister for Social Welfare from 1919 to 1920.
