= Deutsches Weintor eG v Land Rheinland-Pfalz =

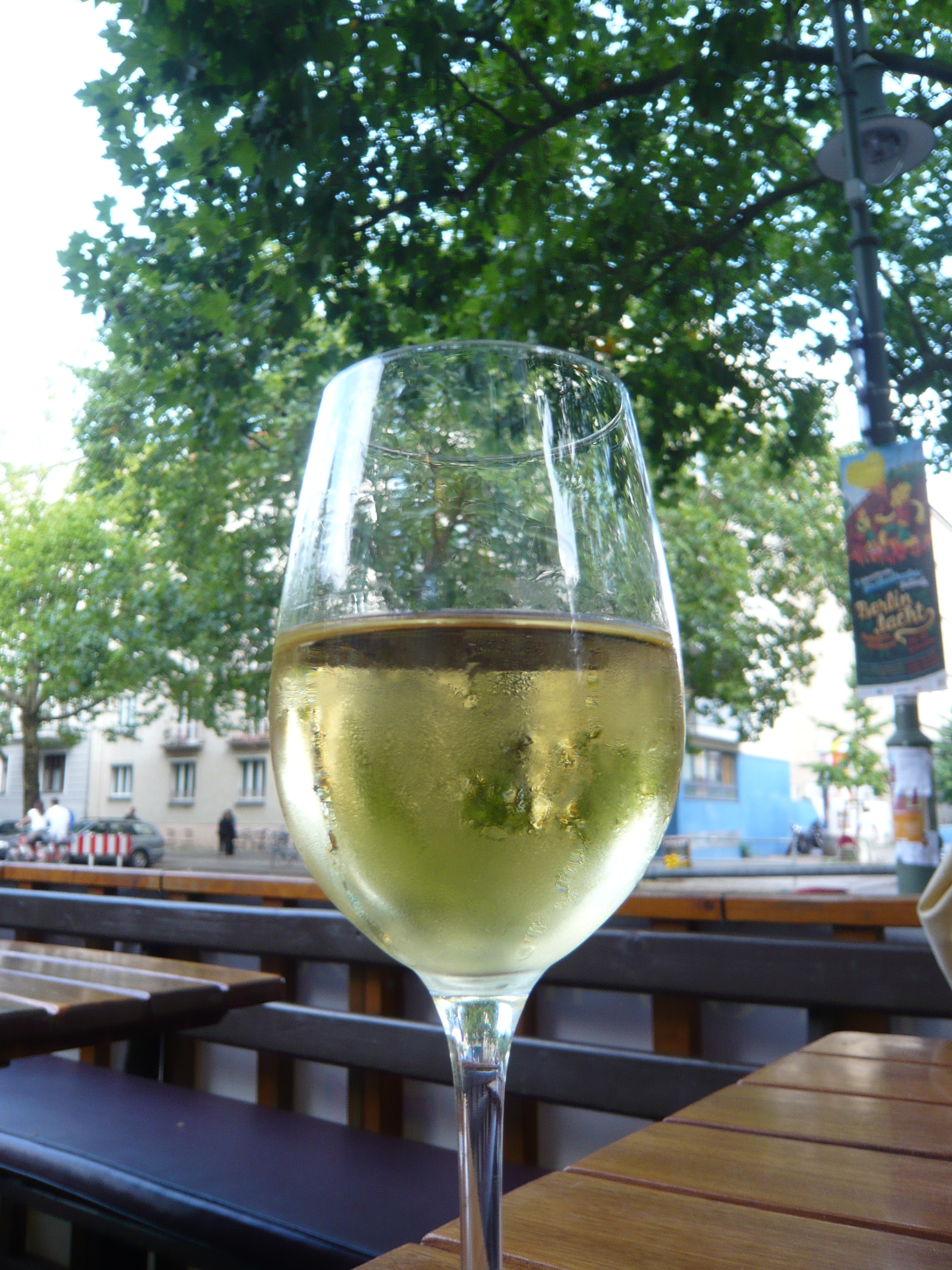
- Court: European Court of Justice
- Citation: (2012) C-544/10

Keywords
- Human rights

Deutsches Weintor eG v Land Rheinland-Pfalz (2012) C-544/10 is an EU law case, concerning the free movement of services in the European Union.

== Facts ==
The Rheinland-Pfalz food regulator claimed that a wine cooperative in Ilbesheim bei Landau in der Pfalz should not describe its wine as ‘easily digestible’ (‘bekömmlich’), accompanied by a reference to the wine's reduced acidity level, because that was a ‘health claim’ under Regulation No 1924/2006 art 2(2)(5), and should therefore not be allowed generally for alcoholic beverages. Deutsches Weintor argued they were making a claim of general well-being, not health.

The Bundesverwaltungsgericht (Federal Administrative Court) referred to the CJEU, suggesting that ‘easily digestible’ was not a health claim, but a comparative claim about the effect of the wine compared to others, and asked what the status might be regarding CFREU articles 15 and 16 (freedom to choose an occupation and run a business).

== Judgment ==
The Court of Justice, Third Chamber held that the concept of a ‘health claim’ did also cover terms such as ‘easily digestible’. One had to regard, not just CFREU articles 15 and 16 but also article 35 on a high level of health protection.

48 As regards, first of all, the protection of health, it must be pointed out that in view of the risks of addiction and abuse as well as the complex harmful effects known to be linked to the consumption of alcohol, in particular the development of serious diseases, alcoholic beverages represent a special category of foods that is subject to particularly strict regulation.

49 In that regard, the Court has already recognised on several occasions that measures restricting the advertising of alcoholic beverages in order to combat alcohol abuse reflect public health concerns and that the protection of public health constitutes, as follows also from Article 9 TFEU, an objective of general interest justifying, where appropriate, a restriction of a fundamental freedom (see, to that effect, Case 152/78 Commission v France [1980] ECR 2299, paragraph 17; Joined Cases C‑1/90 and C‑176/90 Aragonesa de Publicidad Exterior and Publivía [1991] ECR I‑4151, paragraph 15; Case C‑262/02 Commission v France [2004] ECR I‑6569, paragraph 30; and Case C‑429/02 Bacardi France [2004] ECR I‑6613, paragraph 37).

50 Furthermore, while it is apparent from Article 3(a) of Regulation No 1924/2006 that nutrition and health claims in general must not be false, ambiguous or misleading, that requirement applies all the more with regard to alcoholic beverages. It is essential that all claims in relation to such beverages are entirely unambiguous, so that consumers are in a position to regulate their consumption while taking into account all the inherent dangers associated with such consumption, and in so doing to protect their health effectively.

51 However, in a case such as that in the main proceedings, even if the claim at issue can be regarded as being substantively inherently correct in that it indicates reduced acidity levels, the fact remains that it is incomplete. The claim highlights a certain quality that facilitates digestion, but is silent as to the fact that, regardless of a sound digestion, the dangers inherent in the consumption of alcoholic beverages are not in any way removed, or even limited.

52 Thus, the European Union legislature was fully entitled to take the view that claims such as that at issue in the main proceedings are ambiguous or even misleading where they relate to an alcoholic beverage. By highlighting only the easy digestion of the wine concerned, the claim at issue is likely to encourage its consumption and, ultimately, to increase the risks for consumers’ health inherent in the immoderate consumption of any alcoholic beverage. Consequently, the prohibition of such claims is warranted in the light of the requirement to ensure a high level of health protection for consumers.

53 Having regard to the foregoing, the total prohibition of any claim of the kind at issue in the main proceedings may be regarded as being necessary to ensure compliance with the requirements that stem from Article 35 of the Charter.

54 As regards, secondly, the freedom to choose an occupation and the freedom to conduct a business, it must be borne in mind that, according to the case‑law of the Court, the freedom to pursue a trade or profession, like the right to property, is not an absolute right but must be considered in relation to its social function (see, to that effect, Case C‑210/03 Swedish Match [2004] ECR I‑11893, paragraph 72). Consequently, restrictions may be imposed on the exercise of those freedoms, provided that those restrictions in fact correspond to objectives of general interest pursued by the European Union and do not constitute, with regard to the aim pursued, a disproportionate and intolerable interference, impairing the very substance of those rights (Case C‑22/94 Irish Farmers Association and Others [1997] ECR I‑1809, paragraph 27, and Joined Cases C‑20/00 and C‑64/00 Booker Aquaculture and Hydro Seafood [2003] ECR I‑7411, paragraph 68).

55 So far as those objectives are concerned, it follows from paragraphs 48 to 53 of the present judgment that the legislation at issue is designed to protect health, which is an objective recognised by Article 35 of the Charter.

56 As regards compliance with the principle of proportionality, while it is true that the prohibition of the claims at issue imposes certain restrictions on the professional activity of the economic operators concerned in one specific respect, compliance with those freedoms is nevertheless assured in the essential respects.

57 Far from prohibiting the production and marketing of alcoholic beverages, the legislation at issue merely controls, in a very clearly defined area, the associated labelling and advertising.

58 Thus, in a case such as that in the main proceedings, the prohibition at issue does not in any way affect the actual substance of the freedom to choose an occupation or of the freedom to conduct a business.

== See also ==
- European Union law
