= Kleine Kalmit =

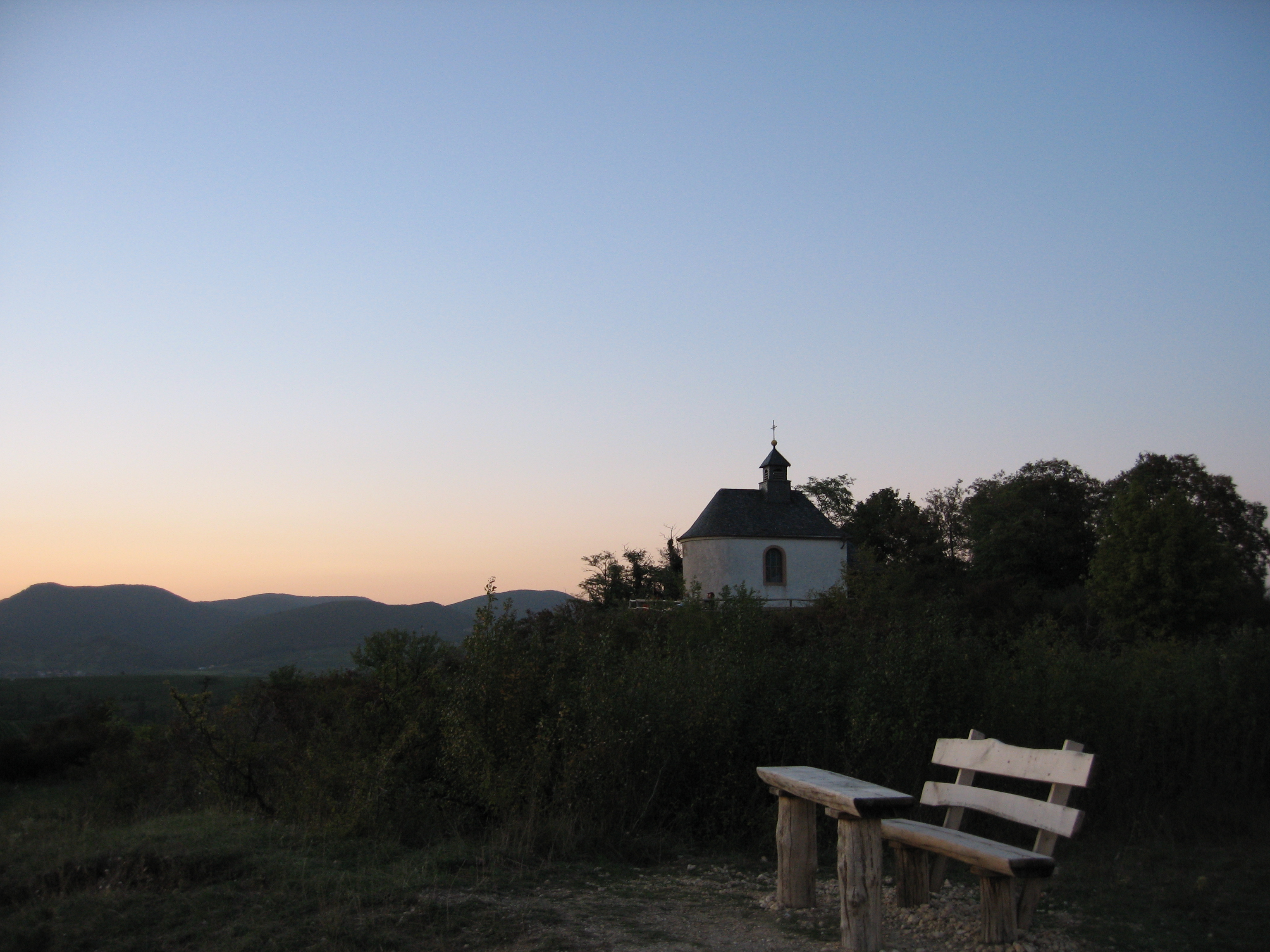
- Chapel on the summit

Highest point
- Elevation: 270.5 m above sea level (NN) (887 ft)
- Coordinates: 49°11′10″N 8°03′27″E

Geography
- Location within Rhineland-Palatinate
- Location: Rhineland-Palatinate, Germany
- Parent range: Haardt, Palatine Forest (Naturschutzgebiet)

The Kleine Kalmit ("Little Kalmit"; from Lat. calvus mons = bare hill) is a hill, 270.5 m above sea level (NN) high, just outside the eastern edge of the Palatine Forest, and the Haardt range, in the German state of Rhineland-Palatinate. Parts of the hill have been designated as a Nature reserve bearing the same name.

== Geography ==
The Kleine Kalmit lies about 15 km south of its namesake, the 672.6 m high Kalmit, and about 6 km southwest of Landau outside the Haardt itself. Most of the hill, including its symbol, the little chapel on the summit dome which is visible for many miles, lies on the territory of the parish of Arzheim in the borough of Landau. Its south and southwest sides, with their vineyards, belong to the municipality of Ilbesheim. This latter area includes the only place in the Palatinate where saffron is grown.

== Flora and fauna ==
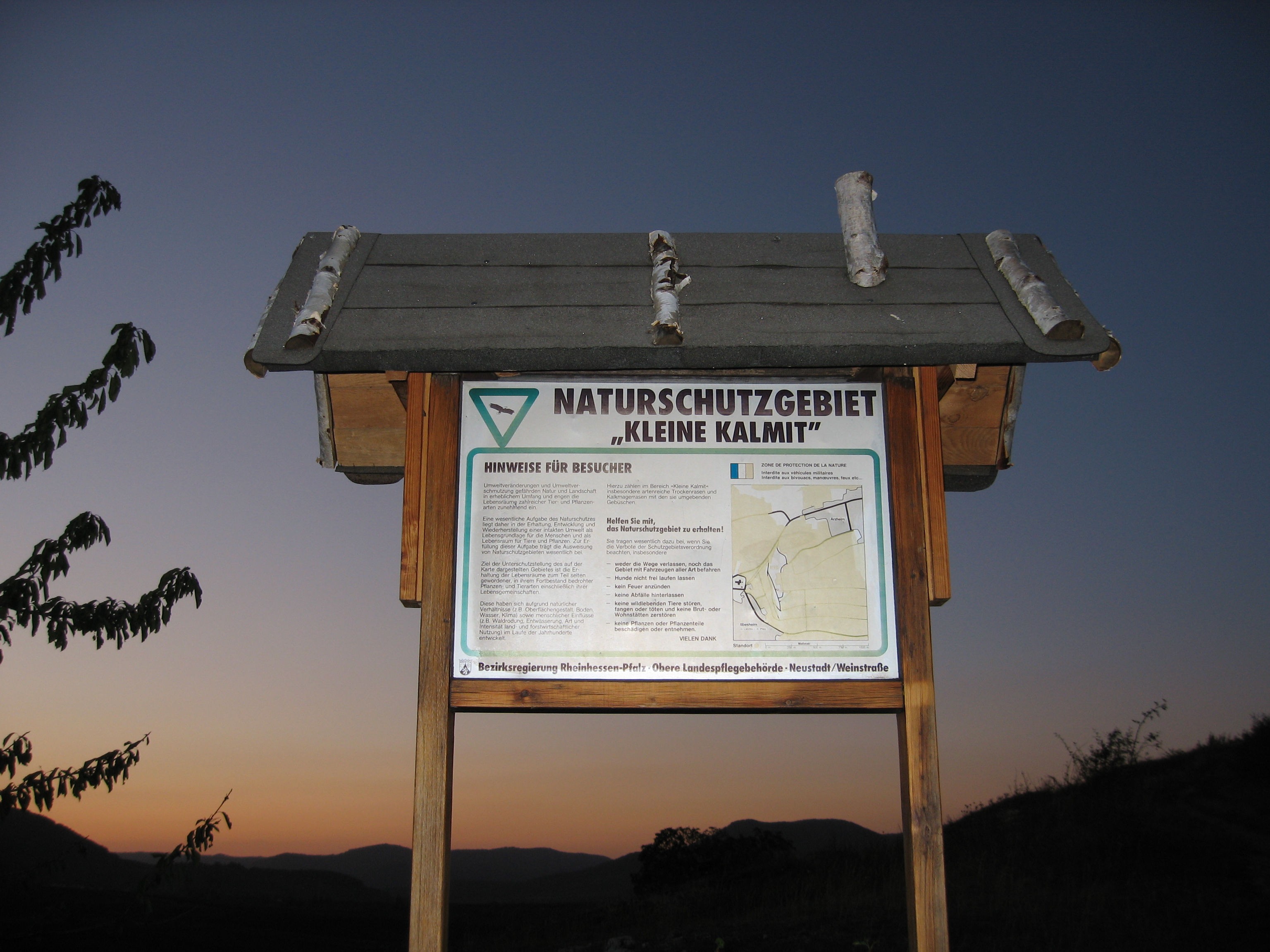
Kleine Kalmit Nature Reserve

The Kleine Kalmit is a botanical jewel with a rich community of the rare pasque flower and is designated as a Nature reserve. Its species-rich fauna includes 87 types of spider and 43 species of butterfly.

In addition, fossils of shark's teeth and artefacts from the Stone Age have been found here.

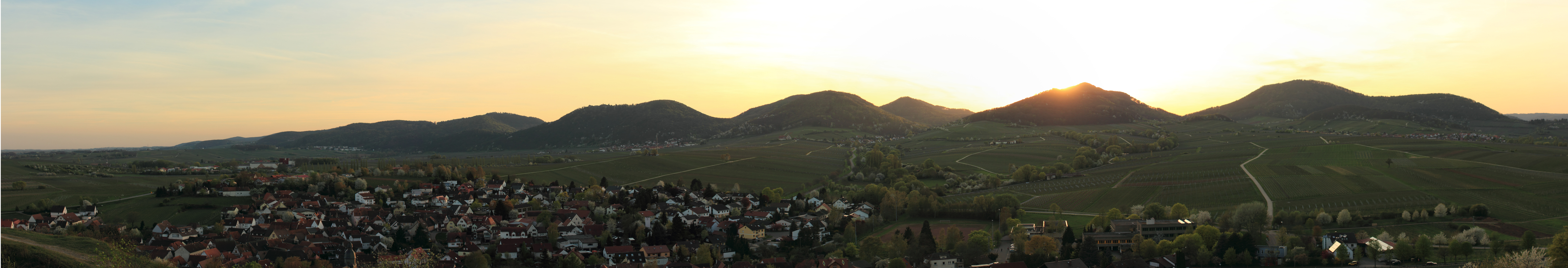
Panoramic view from the Kleine Kalmit looking over Ilbesheim towards the edge of the Haardt at sunset.

== Literature ==
- Michael Geiger, ed. (2008), Haardt, Weinstraße und Queichtal : Ein Geo-Führer (in German), Pollichia-Sonderveröffentlichung, ISBN 978-3-925754-54-8
