= Heinrich von Frauendorfer =

German politician (1855–1921)

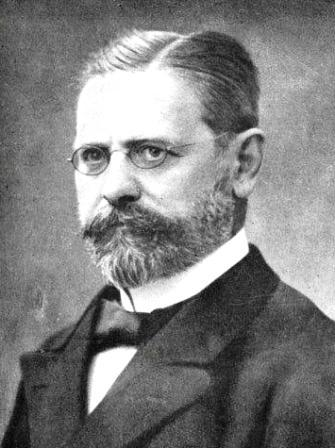
Heinrich von Frauendorfer

Heinrich von Frauendorfer (born 1855 in Höll; died 23 July 1921 in Geiselgasteig) was a German politician and Transport Minister in the Kingdom of Bavaria and the People's State of Bavaria.

== Family ==
He was the son of the teacher Franz Xaver Fraundorfer and his wife Franziska, née Bauer. Fraundorfer married on 14 October 1893 Helene Fraundorfer-Mühlthaler. They had one son.

== Career ==
After his Abitur in 1874, Frauendorfer studied Jurisprudence at the Ludwig-Maximilians-Universität München. After graduation, he joined the Royal Bavarian State Railways. Here he worked until 1 August 1899, most recently as General Council. Then Fraundorfer became an Oberregierungsrat in the Bavarian Ministry of Foreign Affairs in the Transport Department. On 1 August 1900, he was promoted to Ministerialrat. Fraundorfer was awarded on 21 October 1901 the Knight's Cross of the Merit of the Bavarian Crown. This encumbered him in the German Aristocracy to personal nobility. After entry in the Matricula he therefore was allowed to be called Ritter (knight) von Frauendorfer.

He officiated from 1 January 1904 until his retirement on 12 February 1912 as Minister of the newly established Ministry of Transport Affairs in Bavaria and was decisive involved in the electrification of the railways in Bavaria. For his merits, Fraundorfer was meanwhile on 14 September 1908 raised by prince regent Luitpold to the hereditary peerage. Since 1905, he was also freeman of the town Landshut.

1916 Fraundorfer and Edgar Jaffé founded the European political and economic newspaper ; it was published by a brother of Jaffé in Berlin. From 8 November 1918 to 17 March 1919 as well from 16 March to 1 April 1920, he was again Bavarian Minister of Transport Affairs in the state governments. This was followed by his appointment as Secretary of State and head of the Department Bayern in the Ministry of Transportation.

Fraundorfer was a member of the Corps Makaria Munich 1874 and Teutonia Halle (1903). He became engaged to Alma Wild, the daughter of his corp brother Albert Wild. She died before the marriage. Introduced by Wild in the Numismatics, Fraundorfer was chairman of the Bavarian Numismatic Society. When he was accused of forgery of numerous ancient coins in 1921, he took his life.

== Literature ==
- Staatsminister v. Frauendorfer. In: Zeitung des Vereins Deutscher Eisenbahnverwaltungen, 52. Jahrgang, Nr. 15 (24. Februar 1912), S. 243–246.
- Exzellenz von Frauendorfer †. In: Zeitung des Vereins Deutscher Eisenbahnverwaltungen, 61. Jahrgang, Nr. 30 (28. Juli 1921), S. 575–576.
- Max Spindler (Hrsg.), Walter Schärl: Die Zusammensetzung der Bayerischen Beamtenschaft von 1806 bis 1918. Verlag Michael Lassleben. Kallmütz/Opf. 1955. S. 93.
