= Otto von Lossow =

German general (1868–1938)

- Born: 14 January 1869; Hof, Kingdom of Bavaria
- Died: 25 November 1938 (aged 70) Munich, Bavaria, Nazi Germany
- Allegiance: Kingdom of Bavaria; German Empire; Weimar Republic
- Branch: (Kingdom of Bavaria) Bavarian Army; Imperial German Army; Reichsheer
- Service years: 1886–1924
- Rank: Generalleutnant
- Commands: Wehrkreis VII (1923–1924)
- Conflicts: Boxer Rebellion; World War I Beer Hall Putsch
- Awards: Bavaria: Military Merit Order, 2nd Class with Swords; Prussia: Order of the Red Eagle, 2nd Class with Crown and Swords; Austria-Hungary: Military Merit Cross, 2nd Class with War Decoration; Ottoman Empire: Liakat Medal in Gold with Sabers; Ottoman Empire: Order of Osmanieh; Ottoman Empire: Order of Medjidie; Ottoman Empire: Turkish War Medal (so-called "Gallipoli Star")

Otto Hermann von Lossow (15 January 1868 – 25 November 1938) was a Bavarian Army and then German Army officer who played a prominent role in the events surrounding the attempted Beer Hall Putsch by Adolf Hitler and the Nazi Party in November 1923.

== Military career ==
Otto von Lossow was born in Hof in the Kingdom of Bavaria. After visiting the Bavarian Cadet Corps, von Lossow entered the Bavarian Army on 21 July 1886. He served in a variety of assignments, and was trained as a general staff officer. He served as adjutant of the 2. Ostasiatische Infanteriebrigade with the German contingent of the relief expedition during the Boxer Rebellion.

Immediately prior to World War I, Lossow was a lieutenant colonel and a general staff officer without a specific assignment. On mobilization in August 1914, he was assigned to be the chief of the general staff of the II. Bavarian Reserve Corps. Lossow served with the corps until July 1915, when he became the German military attaché in Istanbul (then still called Constantinople in German records) in the Ottoman Empire, where he assisted the Ottoman Army and the many German military advisors in planning the ongoing response to Allied landings at Gallipoli. He also provided valuable testimony concerning the Armenian genocide in its later stages, in which he wrote that "On the basis of all the reports and news coming to me here in Tiflis [now Tbilisi, Georgia] there hardly can be any doubt that the Turks systematically are aiming at the extermination of the few hundred thousand Armenians whom they left alive until now." He remained in the Ottoman Empire for the rest of the war, becoming in April 1916 the "German Military Plenipotentiary at the Imperial Embassy in Constantinople." Despite the title, he was junior to many of the German officers in the Ottoman Empire, who served as military advisors and as commanders of Ottoman military divisions.

In 1918, he was involved in the conflict between the short-lived Transcaucasian Democratic Federative Republic and the Ottomans.

In 1919, Lossow, now a major general (Generalmajor), was part of the transitional force which would become the Reichswehr, the 100,000-man army permitted for Germany under the Treaty of Versailles.

- From 1920 to 1923, he was the commander of the infantry school.
- On 1 January 1923, he became the commander (Befehlshaber) in Wehrkreis VII, the Reichswehr military region which covered Bavaria. He held this assignment through the attempted Beer Hall Putsch until his replacement in March 1924.
- 1935 Portrait bust Otto von Lossow by Arno Breker.
- 1938 death in Munich.

== Beer Hall Putsch ==
Generalmajor von Lossow became briefly prominent in German history as being part of the triumvirate who at that time exercised political control in Bavaria, alongside Gustav Ritter von Kahr, Minister President of Bavaria, and Colonel Hans Ritter von Seisser (Seißer), head of the Bavarian State Police (Landespolizei).

The political situation in Germany was one of turmoil and political violence. The Bavarian Government under Ritter von Kahr tended to take a line independent of that of the national government of the Weimar Republic in Berlin. When ordered to arrest three of the leaders of some armed groups then currently operating in Bavaria, the triumvirate refused. General von Lossow was ordered by the Commander-in-Chief of the army, General Hans von Seeckt, to arrest the three men and to suppress the daily newspaper of the Nazi Party, the Völkischer Beobachter. When he hesitated to do this, he was sacked from his command by General von Seeckt and replaced by General Friedrich Freiherr Kress von Kressenstein. However, Ritter von Kahr defied Seeckt and announced that von Lossow would retain the command.

In 1923, many right-wing groups wanted to emulate Mussolini's "March on Rome" with a "March on Berlin". Among these were the wartime General Erich Ludendorff and also the Nazi Party (NSDAP), led by Adolf Hitler. Hitler decided to try to seize power in what was later known as the "Hitler Putsch" or Beer Hall Putsch. Hitler and Ludendorff sought the support of the triumvirate. However, Kahr, Seisser, and Lossow had their own plan to install a nationalist dictatorship without Hitler.

On 8 November 1923, Hitler and the SA stormed a public meeting of 3,000 people which had been organized by Kahr in the Bürgerbräukeller, a large beer hall in Munich. Hitler interrupted Kahr's speech and announced that the national revolution had begun, declaring the formation of a new government with Ludendorff. While waving his gun around, Hitler demanded the support of Kahr, Seisser and Lossow. Lossow, Kahr and Seisser were detained.

After Hitler left the Beer Hall to supervise the activities of the putschists, Kahr, Seisser, and Lossow were released, ostensibly to fulfill Hitler's orders at their respective offices. Instead, the men fled to join the opposition to Hitler. They went to the barracks of the local infantry regiment, where General Jakob Ritter von Danner, Munich garrison commandant and technically Lossow's deputy, met them. Ritter von Danner, who had been directed independently by General von Seeckt to put down the coup, asked if their statements at the Beer Hall was merely a ruse to escape Nazi custody. The triumvirate agreed, fearing the consequences of their initial cooperation with the putschists, and acted to put down the putsch attempt. Lossow ultimately escaped any disciplinary action for his behavior during the putsch attempt, but never held another command.

== See also ==
- Witnesses and testimonies of the Armenian genocide
