= Erhard Auer =

German politician (1874–1945)

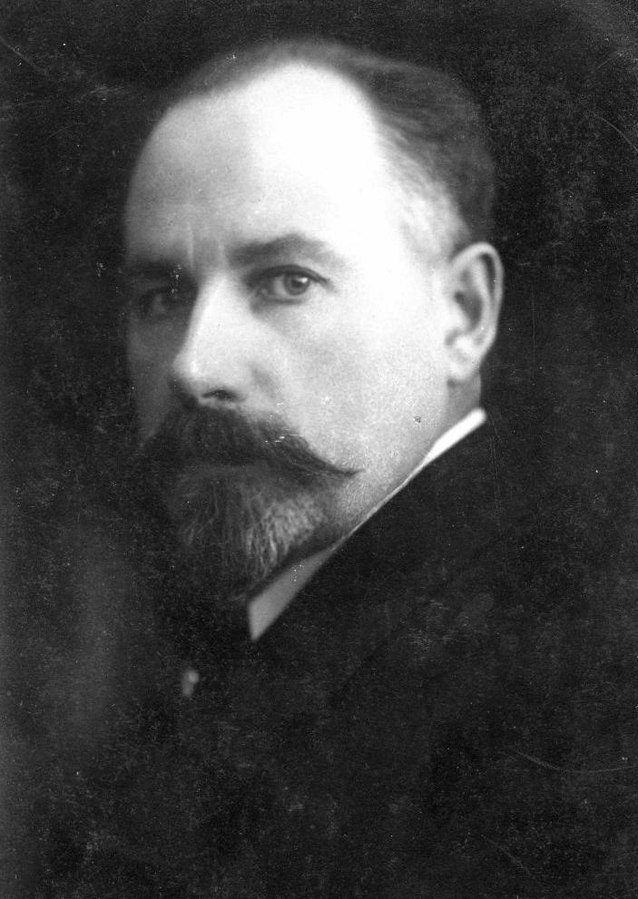
- Auer in 1919

Vice-President of the Bavarian State Parliament
- In office 1919–1919

Member of the Bavarian Chamber of Deputies
- In office 1907–1919

Member of the Munich City Council
- In office 1919–1933

Chairman of SPD Bavaria
- In office 1918–1933
- Preceded by: Georg von Vollmar
- Succeeded by: Lisa Albrecht

Personal details
- Born: 22 December 1874 Dommelstadl, Neuburg am Inn near Passau
- Died: 20 March 1945 (aged 70) Giengen, Württemberg
- Party: Social Democratic Party of Germany

Erhard Auer (22 December 1874 – 20 March 1945) was a Bavarian politician, member of the state parliament, first Minister of the Interior of the Free State of Bavaria, and leader of the Social Democratic Party (SPD) in Bavaria.

== Life and occupation ==
The illegitimate son of a seamstress from an already socially democratic family, Auer was born in Dommelstadl, Neuburg am Inn near Passau. He worked as a farm laborer at the age of twelve. At fifteen, Auer was one of the co-founders of an agricultural labor movement, which was immediately banned. After his military service, he experienced a remarkable social ascent. Starting as a messenger in a Munich trading house in 1896, he eventually attained a senior position through intensive training. In 1900, he began working for the Ortskrankenkasse München. He left this position in 1908 due to his numerous political obligations. During the First World War, Auer served as a soldier.

== Party and parliamentary mandates ==
From 1892 Auer was a member of the Social Democratic Party of Germany. From 1900 to 1921 he was head of the newly established State Secretariat of the Bavarian SPD and was, therefore, a close associate of the chairman Georg von Vollmar. From 1907 Auer was a member of the Bavarian Chamber of Deputies, and from 1919 until the end of the Republic Vice-President of the Bavarian State Parliament. In 1919/20 he was a member of the Constituent Weimar National Assembly.

== Auer during the revolution of 1918/19 ==
Auer was viewed as the great rival of socialist Kurt Eisner (Note: As a socialist journalist, he organised the Socialist Revolution that overthrew the Wittelsbach monarchy in Bavaria in November 1918, which led to his being described as "the symbol of the Bavarian revolution".) who was shot dead in Munich by a German nationalist on 21 February 1919. Auer was viewed as the best hope to fend off a Bolshevik Revolution. To Auer's role during the strike with Krupp in January 1918, Ernst Toller writes in, "A youth in Germany, the leader of the legal socialists. Auer had appeased the workers:" The strike lasted for days until the right-wing socialist parliamentarians took control of the leadership, promising the war minister to strangle the strike, shortly after which the strike collapsed. Before that, a delegation would be elected to "hand over the demands of the strikers to the minister with all seriousness and with all vigor". Auer—the leader of the legal socialists—appeased the dissatisfied workers by vouching for the fulfillment of their demands, promising that he would lead the delegation to the minister, and that no one who participated in the strike would be fired or punished. In the morning, the strikers gathered for a final rally on the Theresienwiese. They moved into the city and dissolved at Karlsplatz.

After the resignation of Georg von Vollmar, Auer was elected as his successor. On 8 November 1918, the provisional National Council of Bavaria elected a revolutionary government of MSPD and USPD with Kurt Eisner as Prime Minister and Erhard Auer as Minister of the Interior.

Auer, who also belonged to the Weimar National Assembly, like the majority of the Bavarian MSPD leadership, endeavored to close as soon as possible a coalition with the Bavarian People's Party and the Liberals, as was also done at the federal level with the Weimar coalition.

In the state elections of 12 January 1919, the USPD suffered a crushing defeat and Eisner wanted to declare his resignation as Prime Minister at the inaugural session of the Diet on 21 February 1919 but was shot on the way to the parliament building by Count Anton Graf von Arco auf Valley. It then came to riots in the state parliament, in which Erhard Auer was shot by the left-wing extremist Alois Lindner and the Major Paul Ritter von Jahreiß (Speaker in the Bavarian Ministry of War) was killed. The conservative MP Heinrich Osel also died of a gunshot wound, but the perpetrators remained unclear in this case.

== Weimar Republic and National Socialism ==
After his recovery, he was operated on by Ferdinand Sauerbruch, Auer took over the chairmanship of the SPD parliamentary group. From 1919 to 1933 he was city councillor in Munich, from October 1922 to 1933 editor at the Munich Post. In the mid-1920s, Auer campaigned for a reformist orientation of the new SPD policy program ("Heidelberg Program") (1925). He was one of the Social Democrats who tried to strongly oppose the rise of the fledging Nazis. On 17 March 1922, he spoke at one of Bavaria's Interior Minister Franz Xaver Schweyer convened the meeting as the sole party chairman in the state parliament against the expulsion of Adolf Hitler to Austria. In response to the Hitler coup in 1923, Auer prompted the formation of social democratic self-protection groups, the so-called Auer-Garden, which were later transferred to the "Reichsbanner Schwarz-Rot-Gold".

After the seizure of power by the NSDAP Auer initially went underground and fled to Innsbruck. A short time later, however, he returned to Munich. On 9 May 1933, he was severely abused by the National Socialists in the Munich City Council and imprisoned in the prison Stadelheim. After his release, Auer was banned from visiting Munich and subsequently forced to change his whereabouts and employment. In connection with the assassination attempt of Hitler on 20 July 1944, Auer, now seriously ill, was again arrested, imprisoned in the Dachau concentration camp and probably relocated to Giengen an der Brenz in Württemberg with an ambulance because of the advancing Allied troops, where he died 20 March 1945.

== Honors ==
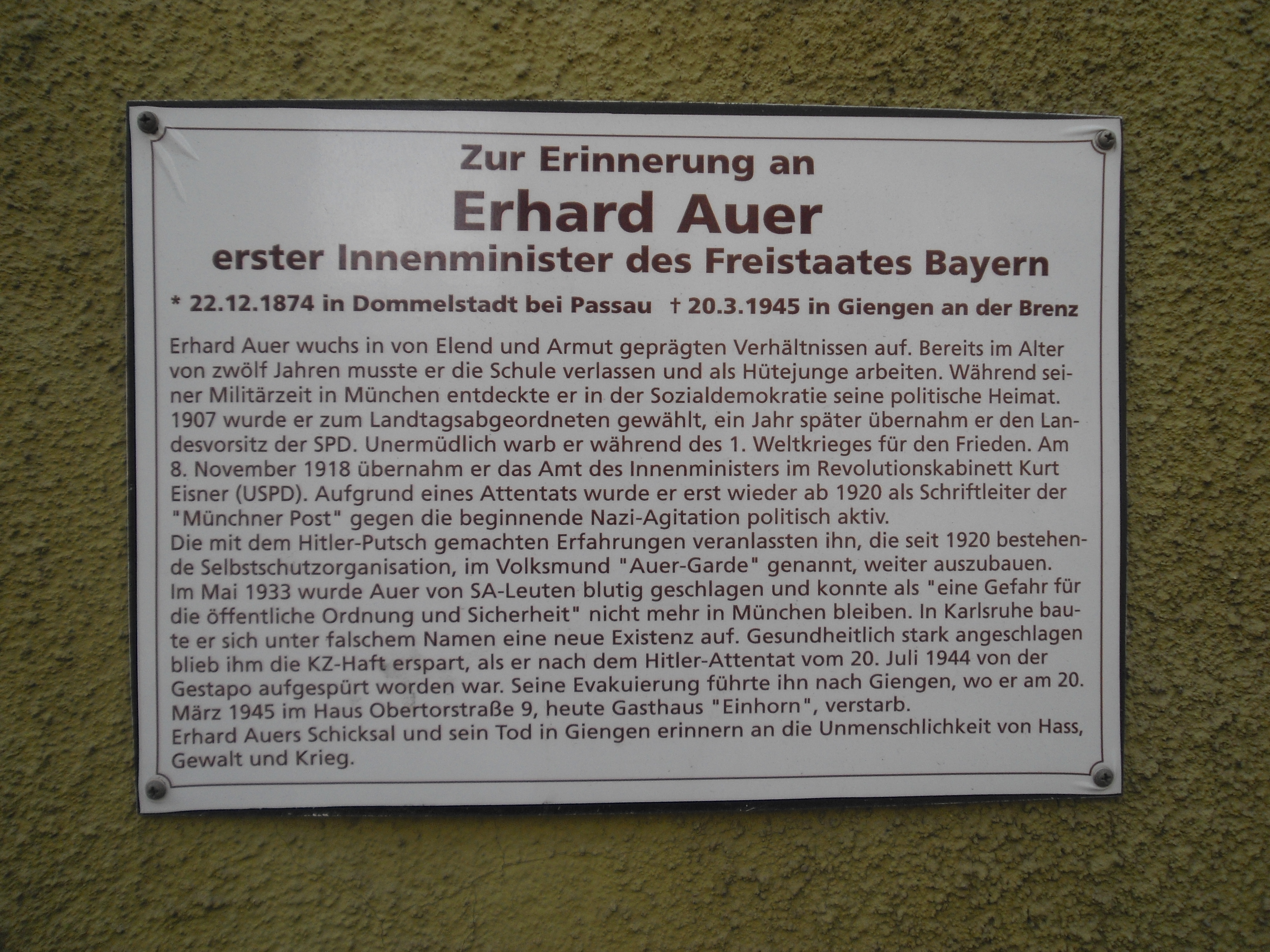
Plaque commemorating Auer in Giengen

In Munich-Neuhausen, the Erhard-Auer-Straße is named after him. 1929: Honorary citizen of the city of Penzberg for his services to the elevation of Penzberg to the city
