= Hans Ritter von Seisser =

German police chief (1874–1973)

Colonel Hans Ritter von Seisser (German Seißer; 9 December 1874 – 14 April 1973) was the head of the Bavarian State Police in 1923.

In September 1923, following a period of turmoil and political violence, Bavarian Prime Minister Eugen von Knilling declared martial law and appointed Gustav von Kahr, Staatskommissar (state commissioner), with dictatorial powers. Seisser, Kahr and Reichswehr General Otto von Lossow together formed a right-wing triumvirate in Bavaria.

That year, many nationalist groups wanted to emulate Mussolini's "March on Rome" by a "March on Berlin". Among these were the wartime General Erich Ludendorff and also the Nazi (NSDAP) group, led by Adolf Hitler. Hitler decided to try to seize power in what was later known as the "Munich Putsch" or Beer Hall Putsch. Hitler and Ludendorff sought the support of the "triumvirate". However, Kahr, Seisser and Lossow had their own plan to install a nationalist dictatorship without Hitler.

Hitler was determined to act before the appeal of his agitation waned. So on November 8, 1923, Hitler and the SA stormed a public meeting of 3,000 people which had been organized by Kahr in the Bürgerbräukeller, a large beer hall in Munich. Hitler interrupted Kahr's speech and announced that the national revolution had begun, declaring the formation of a new government with Ludendorff. While waving his gun around, Hitler demanded the support of Kahr, Seisser and Lossow. Hitler's forces initially succeeded at occupying the local Reichswehr and police headquarters; however, neither the army nor the state police joined forces with Hitler. Kahr, Seisser, and Lossow were briefly detained but then released. The men quickly withdrew their support and fled to join the opposition to Hitler.

The following day, Hitler and his followers marched from the beer hall to the Bavarian War Ministry to overthrow the Bavarian government on their "March on Berlin", but the police dispersed them. Sixteen NSDAP members and four police officers were killed in the failed coup.

Seisser went into retirement in 1930. In 1933, he was arrested by the Nazis and briefly sent to Dachau concentration camp. In 1945, the 72 year old Seisser came out of retirement to assist the American occupation forces in reforming the Munich police. He died in 1973 at the age of 98.
