= Felix Fechenbach =

German-Jewish journalist, poet and political activist

- Born: 28 January 1894; Mergentheim, Kingdom of Württemberg
- Died: 7 August 1933 (aged 39); Kleinenberg forest
- Cause of death: shot extrajudicially
- Occupation: Journalist

Felix Fechenbach (28 January 1894 – 7 August 1933) was a German journalist, author, and political activist. He served as state secretary in the government of Kurt Eisner, who overthrew the Bavarian Wittelsbach Monarchy. After its overthrow, he worked as a newspaper editor during the Weimar Republic. After the Nazi seizure of power, he was arrested and later shot extrajudicially while being transported to Dachau concentration camp.

== Early life ==
He was born in Mergentheim, the son of a lower-middle-class Jewish family. Fechenbach was the son of Noe and Rosalie Fechenbach. He grew up in poverty. He had five brothers: Max, Siegbert, Mortiz, Abraham, and Jackob Fechenbach. Fechenbach's first job was delivering bread with his older brother Abraham in the town of Würzburg. His first best friend was Stoffele, the girl next door; after she died at age 7, he would burst into tears anytime her name was mentioned. He started his very first apprenticeship at age 13 at a shoe store.

He took vocational education in Würzburg until 1910. Later, he worked in a shoe store. In 1911 he secured work in Frankfurt but was later fired for union activity and because of a strike he led.

== Political career ==
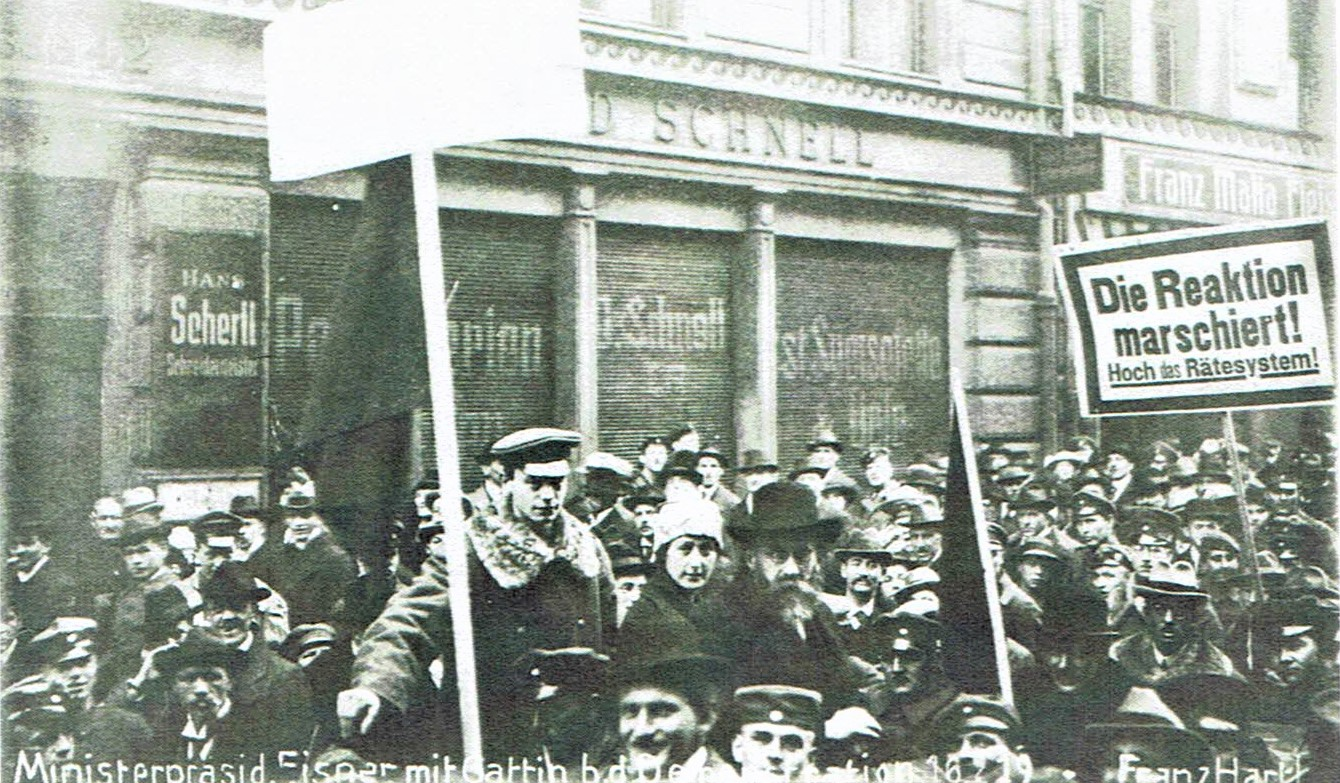
Felix_Fechenbach_(stehend)_mit_Eisner_beri_einer_Demonstration_am_16._Februar_1919

From 1912 until 1914, he was a party secretary of the Social Democratic Party of Germany (SPD) in Munich. During World War I, Fechenbach was wounded, causing him to become a pacifist. He later served as private secretary for Kurt Eisner, the prime minister of Bavaria, shortly after the war.

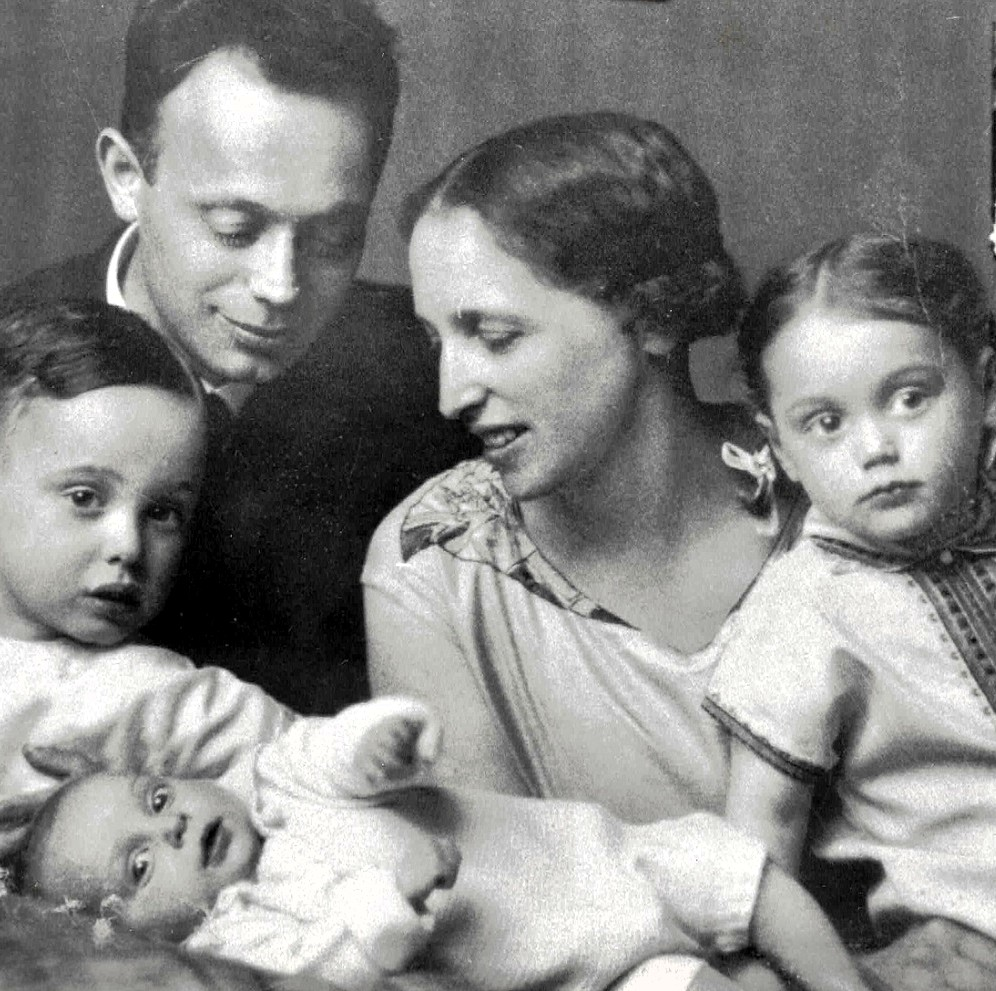
Felix and Irma Fechenbach with their children Kurt, Lotti and Hanni

Fechenbach married Martha Czernichowski on 12 August 1919; the marriage ended in divorce after only two and a half years. On 29 September 1926 he married Irma Epstein; they had three children: Kurt 1927 (named after Kurt Eisner), Lotti 1928 and Hanni 1931. After he was killed by a Sturmabteilung commando on his way to the Dachau concentration camp. His wife, Irma Fechenbach, was able to escape with their children to Switzerland. In 1946, they immigrated to the USA.

He was jailed in 1922 for publishing secret diplomatic telegrams while state secretary under Eisner, before the Bavarian Soviet Republic. He was charged with high treason on 22 October 1922. The decision was a scandal because the court at that time had no standing under the Weimar Constitution. He was pardoned in 1924. He thereafter travelled to Berlin and worked for Kinderfreunde (Friends of Children) and criticised the SPD in his children's stories while still a member of the party.

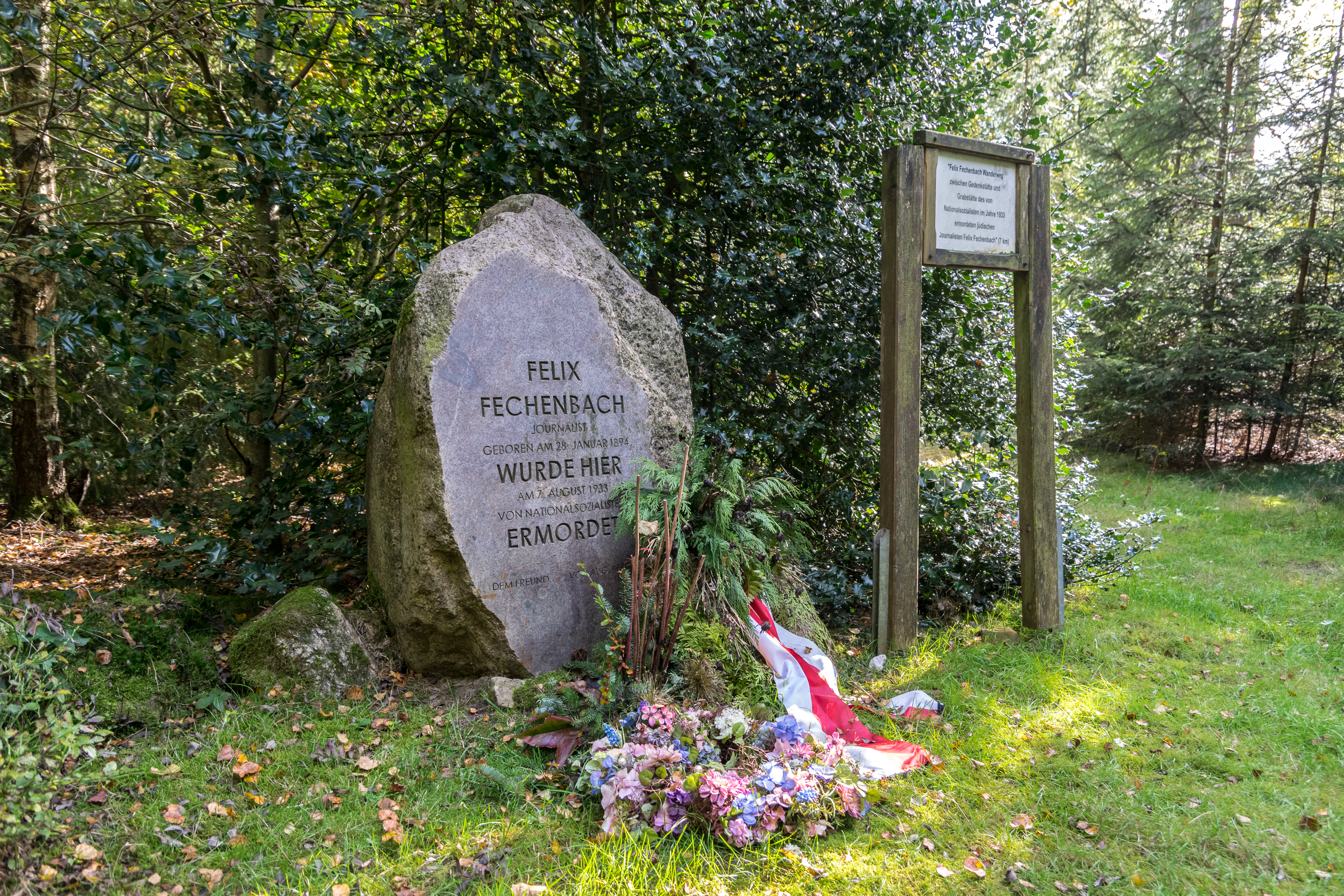
Fechenbach memorial in the Kleinenberger forest

In 1929, he became the editor in chief of the SPD newspaper Volksblatt in Detmold. On 11 March 1933, he was jailed by the new Nazi government for his anti-fascist activities. On 7 August 1933, members of the Schutzstaffel (SS) and SA who were transporting Fechenbach to Dachau concentration camp stopped and ordered him out of the vehicle in a forest between Detmold and Warburg. He was beaten and then shot by the Nazi officers present.

There are two schools named after Fechenbach: the Felix-Fechenbach Gesamtschule in Leopoldshoehe and the Felix-Fechenbach Berufskolleg in Detmold. A street in Detmold and in Oerlinghausen was also named after him.

== Works ==
- Fechenbach, Felix, Frank Meier, ed. (2009). Felix Fechenbach Lesebuch. Köln: Nyland-Stiftung
- Fechenbach, Felix (1925). Im Haus der Freudlosen, J. H. W. Nachfolger, Berlin. Revised edition edited by Roland Flade, Koenigshausen & Neumann, Wuerzburg
- Fechenbach, Felix (1929). Der Revolutionär Kurt Eisner. Aus persönlichen Erlebnissen, J.H.W. Diez, Berlin
- Fechenbach, Felix (1936). Mein Herz schlaegt weiter: Briefe aus der Schutzhaft, Kulturverlag, St.Gallen. Revised edition with a foreword by Heinrich Mann, a contribution by Robert M.W. Kempner and a postscript by Peter Steinbach, Andreas-Haller-Verlag, Passau 1987.
- Fechenbach, Felix (1937). Der Puppenspieler, Verlag E. & K. Scheuch, Zuerich. Revised edition edited by Roland Flade and Barbara Rott, Koenigshausen & Neuman, Wuerzburg 1988.
