= Johannes Hoffmann (SPD politician) =

German politician, SPD in Bavaria (1867–1930)

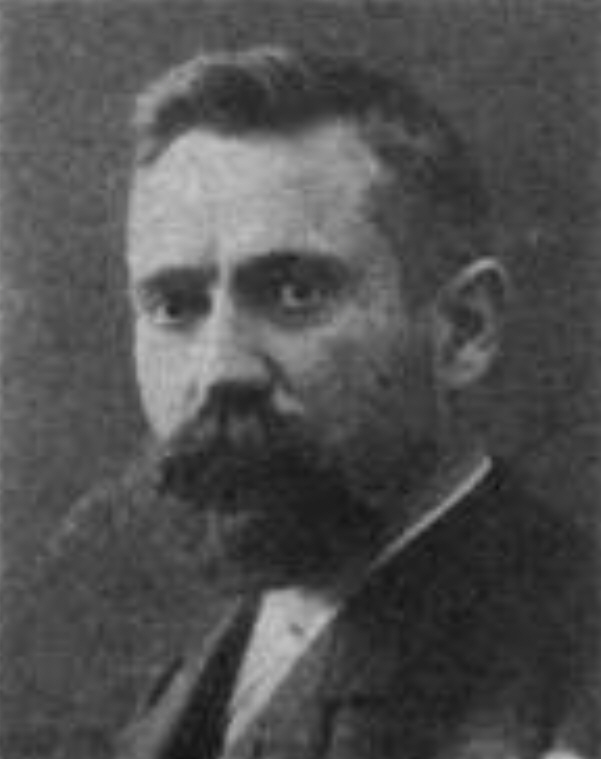

Minister President of Bavaria
- In office 17 March 1919 – 14 March 1920
- Preceded by: Kurt Eisner
- Succeeded by: Gustav Ritter von Kahr

Minister of Education of Bavaria
- In office 8 November 1918 – 14 March 1920
- Preceded by: Eugen von Knilling
- Succeeded by: Franz Matt

Personal details
- Born: 3 July 1867 Ilbesheim, Kingdom of Bavaria
- Died: 15 December 1930 (aged 63) Berlin
- Party: German People's Party; Social Democratic Party of Germany (from 1907)
- Cabinet: Hoffmann

Johannes Hoffmann (3 July 1867 – 15 December 1930) was a German politician and member of the Social Democratic Party from Bavaria. He served as a Minister in the revolutionary government of the People's State of Bavaria, 1919–1920.

== Biography ==
Born in Ilbesheim, near Landau, Palatinate, his parents were Peter Hoffmann and Maria Eva, née Keller. He attended the Gymnasium in Landau, and, having completed his studies at the teaching seminary, served as a school teacher in Kaiserslautern from 1887. He married Luise Ackermann in 1892.

Between 1899 and 1904, Hoffmann was a member of the Kaiserslautern city council, seconded by the liberal German People's Party (DVP). In 1907, he joined the Social Democrats and was elected deputy of the Bavarian Landtag the next year; his candidacy earned him disciplinary proceedings and he finally had to quit public service.

In 1910, he returned to the Kaiserslautern city council and from 1912, he held the position of second mayor. In the same year, he was elected to the German Reichstag parliament. After the German Revolution of 1918–1919 and the establishment of the People's State of Bavaria, he served as Bavarian Minister of Education under Minister-President Kurt Eisner. During his tenure as Minister of Education, he removed the Bavarian schooling system from the supervision of the Catholic Church. After Eisner's assassination (21 February 1919) he succeeded him as minister-president of the People's State of Bavaria on 17 March 1919 as the first freely elected Bavarian Minister President.

Ousted from Munich by the forces of the Bavarian Soviet Republic and the local worker's council led by Hoffmann's former party fellow Ernst Niekisch, the parliament and government fled to Bamberg in April 1919, where Hoffmann took part in the working out of the Bavarian Constitution ("Bamberg Constitution"). After his government had Munich occupied by Reichswehr troops and paramilitary Freikorps units, Hoffmann and his cabinet were able to return in May 1919. However, on 14 March 1920, Hoffmann resigned during the Kapp Putsch and was succeeded by Gustav von Kahr, after he was forced out of office by the Bavarian Civil Guards and Freikorps forces.

Hoffmann returned to Kaiserslautern. After standing unsuccessfully for Mayor of Ludwigshafen, he again tried to pursue his teaching career. Nevertheless, he was dismissed on charges of collaboration during the Allied occupation of the Rhineland. At least, Hoffmann retained his Reichstag mandate until his death in 1930. All pension claims raised by his widow were denied by the Bavarian government.

== Literature ==
- Universitätsbibliothek Regensburg - Bosls bayrische Biographie - Johannes Hoffmann (in German), author: Karl Bosl, publisher: Pustet, page 361.

Political offices
Preceded by Kurt Eisner	Prime Minister of Bavaria; 1919 – 1920	Succeeded by Gustav von Kahr
