= Gustav Ritter von Kahr =

German politician (1862–1934)

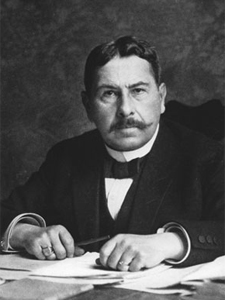
- Kahr in 1920

Minister-President of Bavaria
- In office 16 March 1920 – 21 September 1921
- Preceded by: Johannes Hoffmann
- Succeeded by: Graf von Lerchenfeld-Köfering

Minister of the Interior of Bavaria
- In office 16 March 1920 – 21 September 1921
- Preceded by: Fritz Endres
- Succeeded by: Franz Xaver Schweyer

State Commissioner of Bavaria
- In office 26 September 1923 – 16 February 1924

Personal details
- Born: 29 November 1862 Weißenburg, Kingdom of Bavaria
- Died: 30 June 1934 (aged 71) Dachau concentration camp, Bavaria, Nazi Germany
- Party: Bavarian People's Party
- Occupation: Jurist

Gustav Ritter von Kahr (German: [ˈɡʊstaf ˈʁɪtɐ fɔn ˈkaːɐ̯]; born Gustav Kahr; 29 November 1862 – 30 June 1934) was a German jurist and right-wing politician. During his career, he was district president of Upper Bavaria, Bavarian minister president and, from September 1923 to February 1924, Bavarian state commissioner general with dictatorial powers. In that role, he openly opposed the government of the Weimar Republic in several instances, including by ceasing to enforce the Law for the Protection of the Republic. He was also making plans with General Otto von Lossow and Bavarian police commander Hans von Seisser to topple the Reich government in Berlin. In November 1923, before they could act, Adolf Hitler instigated the Beer Hall Putsch. The three turned against Hitler and helped stop the attempted coup. After being forced to resign as state commissioner general in 1924, Kahr served as president of the Bavarian Administrative Court until 1930. Because of his actions during the Beer Hall Putsch, he was murdered during the Nazi purge known as the Night of the Long Knives in June 1934.

== Early years ==
=== Legal education and work as a cultural preservationist ===
Kahr was born in 1862 in Weissenburg in Bayern, the son of Gustav von Kahr, President of the Bavarian Administrative Court, and his wife Emilie, née Rüttel. After completing school in 1881, he became a member of the 2nd Bavarian Infantry Regiment Kronprinz as a one-year volunteer. From 1882 to 1885 he studied law in Munich. After passing the first state law examination, he received legal training at various courts in Munich until 1888. On 12 January 1889, he joined the government of Upper Bavaria as a trainee (Akzessist) in the Department of the Interior and became a government assessor in 1897. His main field of activity in the decade before the turn of the century was organizing the preservation of folk art and endangered architectural monuments. He was a co-founder of the Bavarian State Association for the Preservation of Local History. Beginning in 1902, Kahr quickly passed through the stages of ministerial service up to the level of state councilor (Staatsrat). In 1911, he was awarded the Order of Merit of the Bavarian Crown for his services to the cultivation of folk art and thus received personal nobility. On 1 February 1912, he was granted the title and rank of privy councilor (Geheimrat) and on 1 October was appointed ministerial director and councilor of state in the senior civil service. During his years in the Ministry of State, he continued to devote himself primarily to the preservation and protection of endangered cultural assets.

=== District president and minister president ===
Although he was a reserve officer, Kahr did not participate in World War I because the minister to whom he reported did not want to release him from his position working to ensure food security. In 1917, King Ludwig III of Bavaria appointed Kahr district president of Upper Bavaria, and while serving in this role, Kahr was one of the first officials to predict the coming upheaval. The fall of both the German Hohenzollern and Bavarian Wittelsbach monarchies during the early days of the German Revolution of 1918–1919 that broke out after Germany's defeat in the war led the intrinsically apolitical Kahr into politics. As district president Kahr proposed the creation of a civil defense force, but his suggestion did not meet with the approval of Bavaria's new Minister President Johannes Hoffmann of the Social Democratic Party (SPD). When the Bavarian Soviet Republic was proclaimed in April 1919, Kahr fled Munich with Hoffmann and the rest of the state government to Bamberg, where they called for volunteers to help crush the soviet republic. Those who responded were organized into Freikorps. After the suppression of the soviet republic at the beginning of May, during which about 335 civilians were killed by Freikorps fighters, Munich's leaders wanted to maintain the capabilities of the Freikorps but without their drawbacks. They saw them as too violent, too small, and too independent of the Bavarian state. The paramilitary Civil Guards, or Einwohnerwehr, was formed in an attempt to resolve the problems.

Following the failure of the 1920 Kapp Putsch in Berlin, General Arnold von Möhl, after consulting with Kahr, Georg Escherich and Munich Police Chief Ernst Pöhner, demanded that Minister President Hoffmann establish an emergency regime in Bavaria. Hoffmann refused to do so and resigned, followed by the rest of his cabinet. Kahr was then elected Minister President by the Bavarian Reichstag on 16 March 1920. A Protestant monarchist and member of the Catholic Bavarian People's Party (BVP), Kahr presided over a middle-class right-wing government and pursued an independent position for Bavaria within the German Reich. Backed by the Civil Guard, he had the leftist workers' and soldiers' councils dissolved and established Bavaria's reputation as the Reich's "cell of order" (Ordnungszelle), referring to the "order" in Bavaria after the turmoil and bloodshed of the Bavarian Soviet Republic and in contrast to the "Marxist" Weimar Republic headed by Social Democrats. As part of an anti-Semitic campaign throughout Germany in 1920 and following a suggestion from Crown Prince Rupprecht of Bavaria, Kahr ordered the mass expulsion from Bavaria of so-called Eastern Jews, many of whom had lived there for generations.

After the enactment in Berlin of the Law for the Protection of the Republic, which increased the punishments for politically motivated acts of violence and banned organizations that opposed the "constitutional republican form of government" as well as their printed matter and meetings, Kahr resigned in protest on 12 September 1921 since the act led to the disbanding of the Civil Guard, which was Kahr's main source of support. He returned to his former post as district president of Upper Bavaria.

== State commissioner ==
=== Conflicts with the Reich government ===
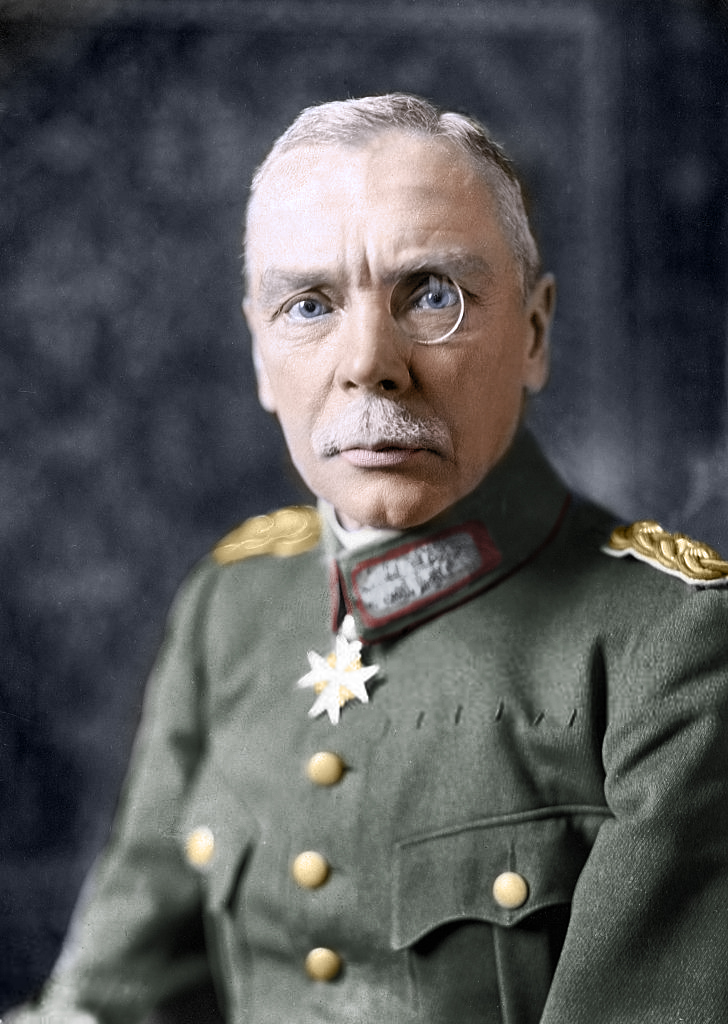
General Hans von Seeckt

On 26 September 1923, following a period of turmoil that included assassinations and political violence, the Bavarian state government of Minister President Eugen von Knilling (BVP) appointed Kahr state commissioner general (Generalstaatskommissar) with dictatorial powers under Article 64 of the Bamberg (Bavarian) Constitution. The step was taken in protest against the Reich government for ending passive resistance to the occupation of the Ruhr by French and Belgian troops. On the same day, Kahr declared a state of emergency in Bavaria. In response, Reich President Friedrich Ebert (SPD) instituted a state of emergency throughout Germany and transferred executive power to Minister of Defense Otto Gessler. Kahr refused to carry out his orders, such as banning the Nazi Party newspaper Völkischer Beobachter, and on 29 September he suspended the enforcement in Bavaria of the Law for the Protection of the Republic. Beginning in mid-October, Kahr again had several hundred Jewish families who had immigrated from Eastern Europe decades earlier expelled from Bavaria. By this means he sought to solidify his support among the supporters of Adolf Hitler and the Deutscher Kampfbund, a league of nationalist societies led by Hitler. At the time Kahr and Hitler were in rivalry with each other for leadership of the right-wing camp.

On 20 October 1923, Lieutenant General Otto von Lossow, regional commander of the Reichswehr (the German armed forces) and commander of the Munich military district, was relieved of his posts by Defense Minister Gessler for refusing to obey orders. Kahr then reinstated him as Bavarian state commander and entrusted him with the command of the Reichswehr in Bavaria. Two days later, he had the Munich Reichswehr Division take an oath to Bavaria and its government as "trustees of the German people". On 9 November 1923 Reich President Ebert imposed a military state of emergency across Germany and told General Hans von Seeckt to do "whatever was necessary to secure the Reich". In spite of Bavaria's openly rebellious acts, the Reich government did not impose a federal intervention (Reichsexekution) against it. Seeckt would not have been willing to implement the Reichsexekution because he insisted that "troops do not fire on troops". He was also pursuing dictatorial aspirations of his own at the national level.

Kahr, together with von Lossow and Hans von Seisser, commander of the Bavarian police, formed a "triumvirate" with the goal of using Bavaria as a base from which to overthrow the Republic and establish a national dictatorship. It was to be accomplished by a march on Berlin modeled on Benito Mussolini's successful March on Rome of a year earlier and was not to include Hitler. Kahr warned the "patriotic associations" – including the Kampfbund – against independent action. He remarked to an assembly of high-ranking officers on 19 October 1923 that the real matter at hand was "a great battle of two worldviews which will decide the destiny of the German people – the international Marxist-Jewish and the national Germanic." Weighing on Kahr's mind however, were the Weimar leadership's warnings against revolutionary activities, including the threat of a military intervention. Seeckt reiterated the warnings, prompting the triumvirate of Kahr, Lossow and Seisser to back down. They then informed the members of the Kampfbund that it was they who would determine when action would be taken. The statement greatly angered Hitler.

=== The Hitler-Ludendorff Putsch ===
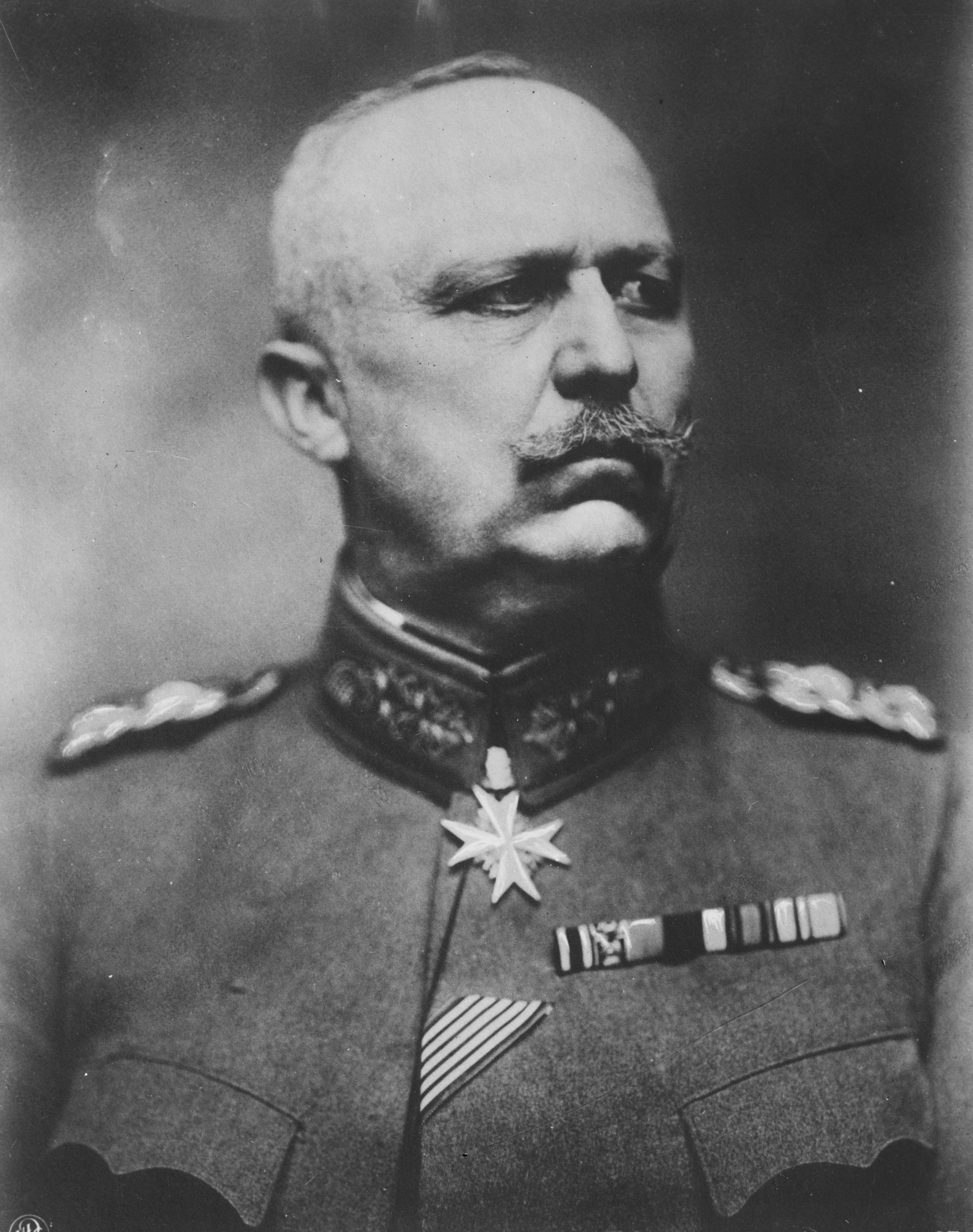
General Erich Ludendorff

On 8 November 1923, while Kahr was delivering a speech to an audience of some 3,000 in the packed hall of Munich's Bürgerbräukeller, the meeting was stormed by Adolf Hitler, Erich Ludendorff, Hermann Göring and other National Socialists. Hitler proclaimed a "national revolution" and called for Kahr, Lossow and Seisser to meet with him. In a back room, he compelled Kahr and the others at gunpoint to join the national uprising that he had proclaimed. Returning to the hall, the three called for those present to support Hitler's coup, which was planned for the next day. In view of their word of honor not to do anything against Hitler, Ludendorff did not have Kahr, Lossow and Seisser imprisoned. The latter two then immediately initiated countermeasures to put down the coup. After a few hours of internal wrangling, Kahr also turned against Hitler and at 2:55 a.m. broadcast a ban on the Nazi Party, Freikorps Oberland and Bund Reichskriegsflagge (Imperial War Flag Society).

During the night, and unknown to Hitler, the three men prepared resistance against the coup. The following day when Hitler and his followers marched from the beer hall to the Bavarian War Ministry to overthrow the Bavarian government as a prelude to their "March on Berlin", the police dispersed them. Fifteen Nazis and four police officers were killed. Kahr's involvement in the collapse of Hitler's coup attempt cost him the support of right-wing nationalist forces in Bavaria, and he was made a scapegoat for the failure.

Two months later, on 18 January 1924, Minister President von Knilling, under pressure from Berlin, forced Kahr to resign from his post as state commissioner general. On 26 February 1924 Kahr testified as a witness in the treason trial against Hitler and the other putschists. From 16 October 1924 to 31 December 1930 he served as president of the Bavarian Administrative Court. He retired in relative obscurity on 1 January 1931.

== Death ==
On the evening of 30 June 1934, in the course of the Nazi purge known as the Night of the Long Knives, the 71-year-old Kahr was arrested in his Munich apartment by an SS commando. On the way to the Dachau concentration camp, he was severely maltreated by two SS men. By order of the camp's commandant Theodor Eicke, Kahr was taken to the camp's detention building, known as the "bunker" where he was handed over to the detention supervisor. He was shot shortly thereafter, most probably by Johann Kantschuster, the head guard of the bunker. Soon after Kahr's murder, the legend arose – one that has even made its way into professional literature – that his body had been found mutilated with pickaxes outside in the Dachau Moor shortly after 30 June. In July 1934 the Chief Public Prosecutor's Office at the Munich II Regional Court began investigations into Kahr's death. On 14 July, the Reich Ministry of Justice informed the Bavarian Ministry of Justice that the Kahr case fell "under the Law on Measures of State Self-Defense of 3 July 1934" and was thus legal. The proceedings for the killing of Kahr were then discontinued on the grounds that "there was no punishable act".

== Family ==
In 1890, Kahr married Ella Schübeck (1864–1938), daughter of Gustav Schübeck, a senior government official, and Louise Vocke. The couple had four daughters, one of whom died young.

Political offices
Preceded by Johannes Hoffmann	Minister-President of Bavaria; 1920 – 1921	Succeeded by Hugo Graf von und zu Lerchenfeld
