= Anton Graf von Arco auf Valley =

Bavarian German far-right activist (1897–1945)

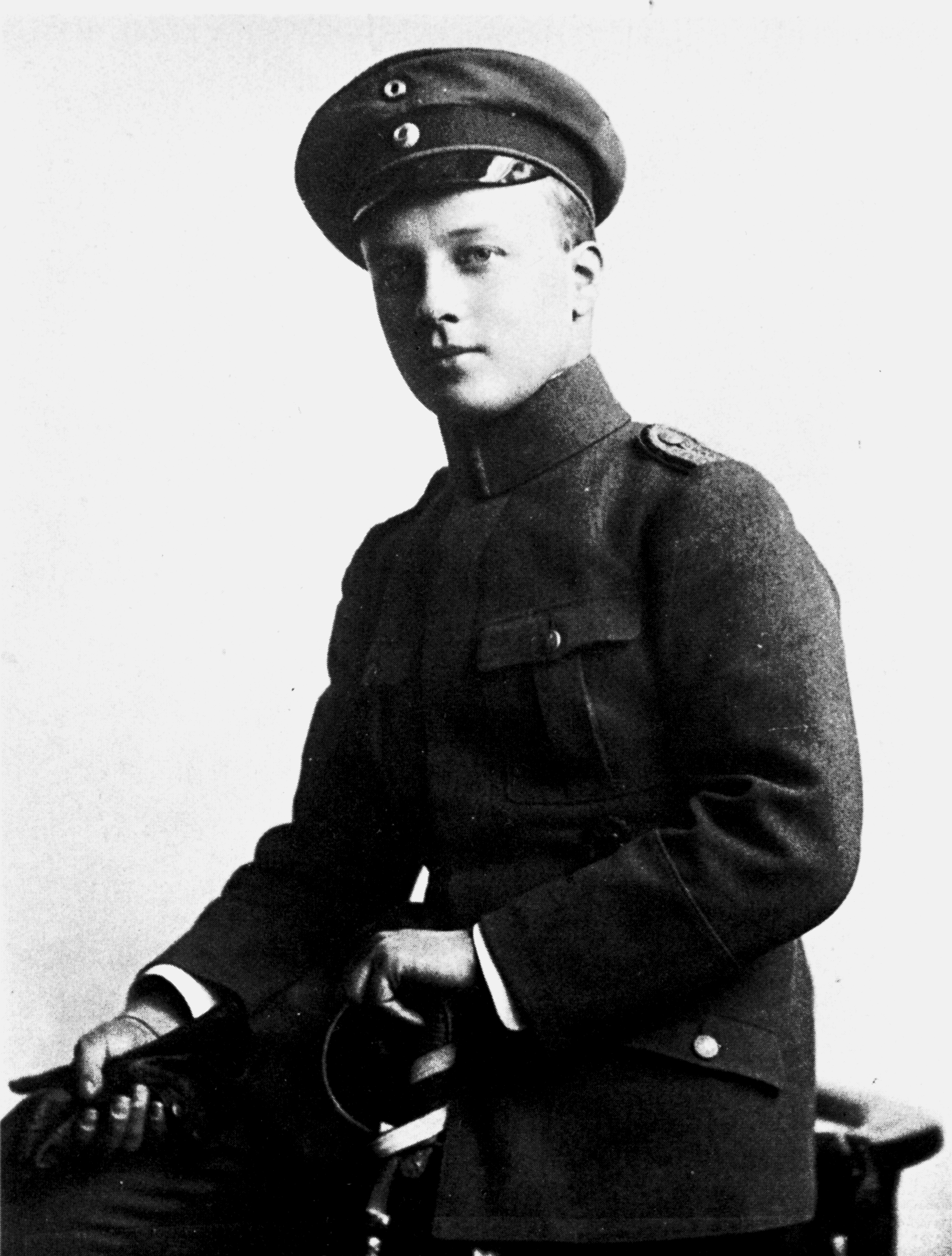
- Born: 5 February 1897; Sankt Martin im Innkreis, Upper Austria, Austria-Hungary
- Died: 29 June 1945 (aged 48); Salzburg, Allied-occupied Austria
- Military career
- Allegiance: German Empire
- Branch: Imperial German Army
- Known for: Assassinating Kurt Eisner
- Conflicts: World War I

Anton von Padua Alfred Emil Hubert Georg Graf von Arco auf Valley (5 February 1897 – 29 June 1945), commonly known as Anton Arco-Valley, was a German far-right activist, Bavarian nationalist and nobleman. He assassinated socialist Bavarian prime minister Kurt Eisner, the first premier of the People's State of Bavaria, on 21 February 1919.

== Early life ==
He was born in Sankt Martin im Innkreis in Upper Austria, into the ancient House of Arco, a noble family originally from Arco in northern Italy. His father, Count Maximilian von Arco-Valley (1849–1911) was a businessman and estate owner, whose elder sister had married John Dalberg-Acton, 1st Baron Acton. Anton's mother, Emily Freiin von Oppenheim (1869–1957), was from the wealthy Oppenheim banking family of German-Jewish descent. His family had lived in Germany for centuries. His noble title was no longer officially recognised by the post-1918 First Austrian Republic.

After serving with a Bavarian regiment, the Royal Bavarian Infantry Lifeguards Regiment, in the last year of World War I, Anton returned from the front as an angry and disillusioned combat veteran. He was an Austrian citizen by birth who had later adopted Germany as his home and he enrolled in the Ludwig-Maximilians-Universität München. As a national-conservative, an aristocrat, a monarchist, and a proclaimed anti-Semite (despite his mother's Jewish ancestry), Anton detested Kurt Eisner, the secular Jewish leader of the Independent Social Democratic Party and Premier of the People's State of Bavaria.

Eisner is a Bolshevist, a Jew; he isn't German, he doesn't feel German, he subverts all patriotic thoughts and feelings. He is a traitor to this land.

— Anton Graf von Arco auf Valley.

== Assassination of Eisner ==
Arco-Valley may have decided to assassinate Eisner to prove himself "worthy" after being rejected for membership in the Thule Society, an ultra-nationalist, völkisch, and neo-pagan occultist group, because he was of Jewish descent.

On 21 February 1919, on a Munich street, Arco-Valley, acting alone, gunned down Eisner. Eisner's bodyguards immediately shot Arco, critically injuring him. Arco was in danger of suffocating due to bleeding from a shot in the neck but his life was saved by the famous surgeon Professor Ferdinand Sauerbruch, who was in Munich at that time; Sauerbruch was himself arrested after refusing to release Arco-Valey into the custody of the authorities and narrowly escaped execution.

The killing of Eisner made Arco-Valley a hero to the far right. His fellow students at the University publicly proclaimed him such. However, his action triggered retaliation by socialists, communists, and anarchists throughout Munich, during which a number of people were killed, including Prince Gustav of Thurn and Taxis. After internal fighting broke out within the government, the Bavarian Soviet Republic was established. Arco-Valley inspired the young Joseph Goebbels, who was in Munich at the time.

Hitler later wrote in Mein Kampf that "Eisner's death only hastened developments and led finally to the Soviet dictatorship, or to put it more correctly, to a passing rule of Jews, as had been the original aim of the instigators of the whole revolution". Hitler apparently became an open adherent of the counterrevolution only after the defeat of the Soviet Republic by the Reich troops and the Freikorps, when he was included in a three-man commission investigating those of his fellow soldiers who had supported the revolution.

Arco-Valley was tried for murder in January 1920. He was found guilty and sentenced to death. The Public Prosecutor said of him, "If the whole German youth were imbued with such a glowing enthusiasm, we could face the future with confidence." The surgeon who had operated on Arco-Valley, Sauerbruch, also praised him:

For me there is no doubt that this man committed this deed out of a conviction that he was thereby doing his Fatherland a service. If only one single person in the Revolution had done this work with such clean hands.

Judge Georg Neithardt was also sympathetic:

Of course, there could be no question of a deprivation of civil rights, because the actions of the young politically immature man did not arise from base sentiments, but from ardent love for his people and fatherland, and were the result of the indignation against Eisner that prevailed in wide circles of the population."

After his sentencing, Arco-Valley made anti-communist and nationalistic statements to the court. In response, the entire courtroom broke into applause lasting for minutes. The following day, the Bavarian government, under Justice Minister and German Democratic Party politician, Ernst Müller-Meiningen, passed a unanimous resolution commuting Arco's sentence to life imprisonment, to be spent in fortress confinement. He served his sentence at Landsberg Prison in cell 70. In 1924 he was evicted from his cell to make way for Adolf Hitler. He was released in 1925, and was on probation until 1927, when he was pardoned.

== Later life ==
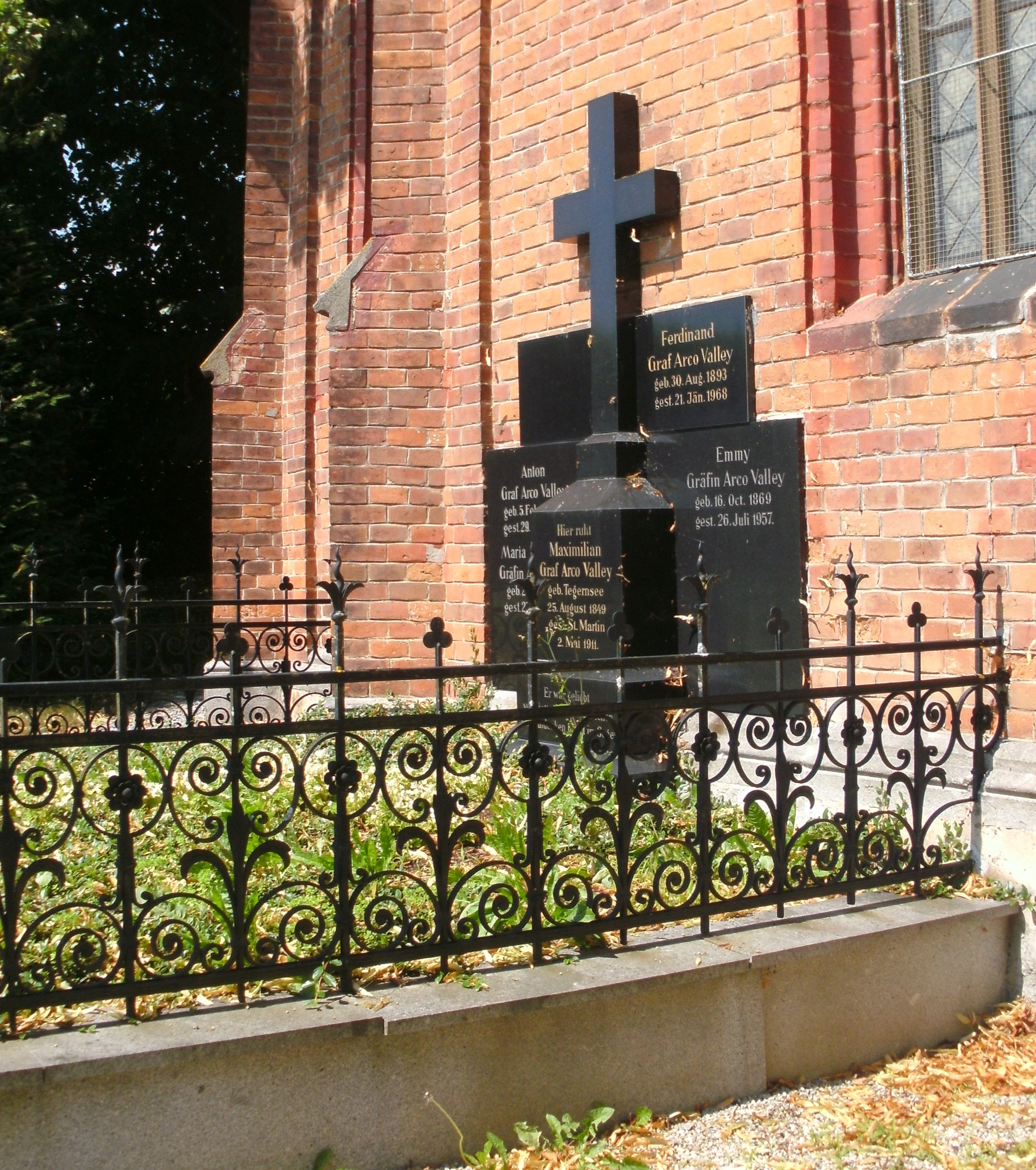
Arco family grave at Sankt Martin im Innkreis, where Arco-Valley is buried

Arco-Valley played only a minor part in politics thereafter. He supported a federalist government for Germany, contrary to the Nazi Party's centralist policies. He worked initially as the editor of the newspaper Bayerisches Vaterland (Bavarian Fatherland) and later as the director of state-funded operations at Süddeutsche Lufthansa from which he resigned in early 1930. Arco-Valley was one of the most radical members of the monarchist-federalist wing of the Bavarian People's Party.

He was briefly held in "protective custody" by the Gestapo when the Nazis took power because of his Bavarian monarchist and federalist views. A remark attributed to him that he would gladly assassinate again was interpreted as a threat to Hitler, but he was released when he promised not to do to Hitler what he had done to Eisner.

In June 1945, Arco-Valley, 48, was killed in a traffic accident in Salzburg. He was passing a horse-drawn cart when his car collided with a U.S. Army vehicle. Two other passengers were injured, but Arco-Valley suffered a chest contusion and died at the scene.

== Family ==
On 10 July 1934, he married his distant cousin, Maria Gabrielle Countess (Gräfin) von Arco-Zinneberg, daughter of Count Joseph von und zu Arco-Zinneberg (great-grandson of Maria Leopoldine of Austria-Este) and his wife, Princess Wilhelmine von Auersperg.

Arco-Valley was survived by his wife, who died in 1987, his mother and four daughters. He was a contemporary of another distant cousin of rather different political views, the physicist/inventor Count Georg von Arco (1869–1940). Anton Graf von Arco's elder brother, Count Ferdinand (1893–1968), married Gertrud Wallenberg (1895–1983), a member of the Swedish banking dynasty and cousin of the anti-Nazi hero Raoul Wallenberg.
