= Ilbesheim bei Landau in der Pfalz =

- Municipality
- Coat of arms

- Location of Ilbesheim bei Landau in der Pfalz within Südliche Weinstraße district
- Interactive map of Ilbesheim bei Landau in der Pfalz
- Location within Germany Location within Rhineland-Palatinate
- Coordinates: 49°11′00″N 8°03′17″E
- Country: Germany
- State: Rhineland-Palatinate
- District: Südliche Weinstraße
- Municipal assoc.: Landau-Land

Government
  - Mayor (2019–24): Peter Jean

Area
  - Total: 6.07 km^{2} (2.34 sq mi)
- Elevation: 202 m (663 ft)

Population (2025-12-31)
  - Total: 1,172
  - Density: 193/km^{2} (500/sq mi)
- Time zone: UTC+01:00 (CET)
  - Summer (DST): UTC+02:00 (CEST)
- Postal codes: 76831
- Dialling codes: 06341
- Vehicle registration: SÜW
- Website: www.ilbesheim.de

Ilbesheim bei Landau in der Pfalz (German pronunciation: [ˈɪlbəshaɪm baɪ ˈlandaʊ ʔɪn deːɐ̯ ˈpfalts], lit. 'Ilbesheim near Landau in der Pfalz') is a municipality in Südliche Weinstraße district, in Rhineland-Palatinate, western Germany.

== Geography ==
Ilbesheim lies on the slopes of the Kleine Kalmit, a hill just outside the Haardt range, southwest of the town of Landau in der Pfalz.
