= Kurt Eisner =

German politician, revolutionary and journalist

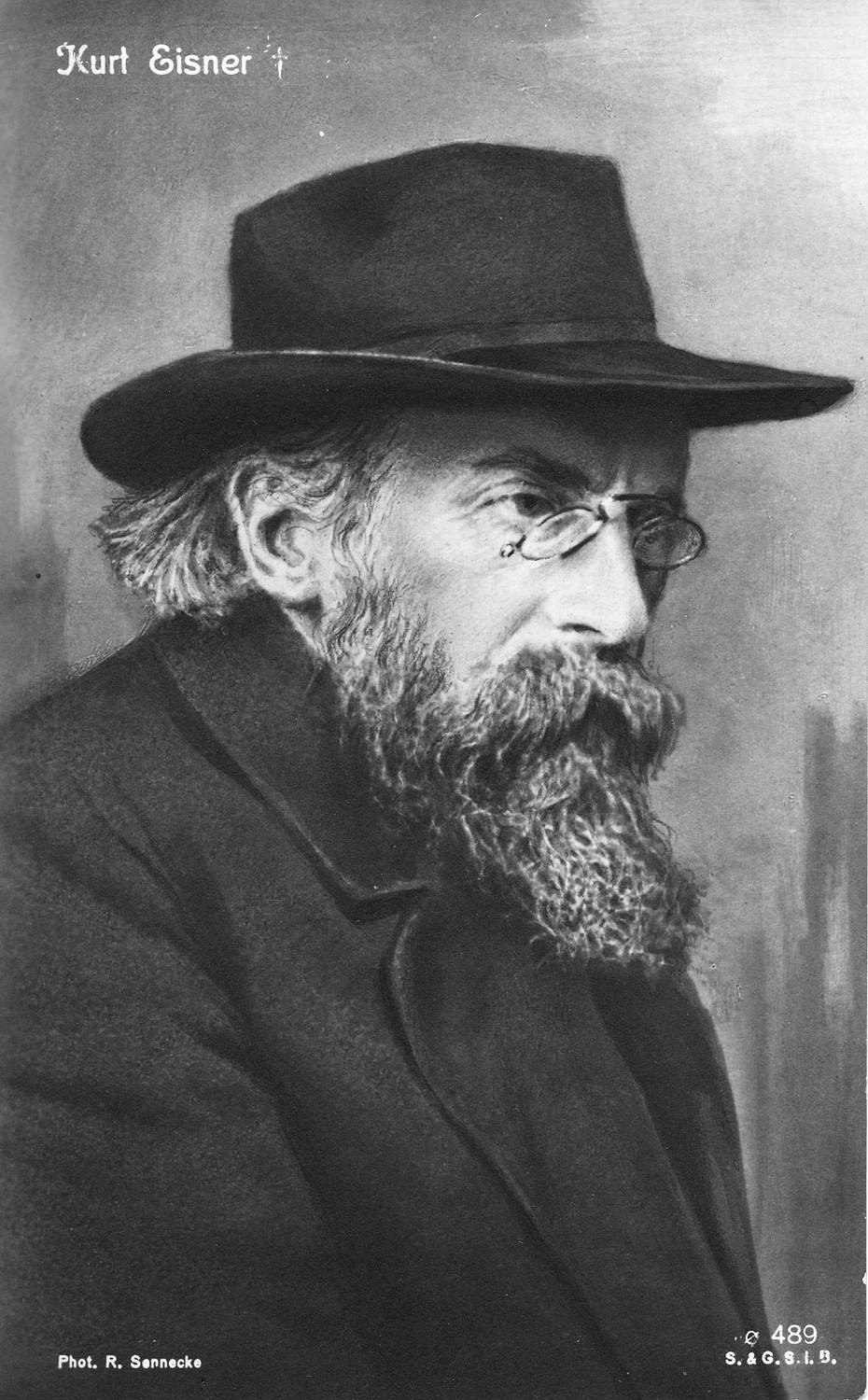

Minister President of the People's State of Bavaria
- In office 8 November 1918 – 21 February 1919
- Preceded by: Otto Ritter von Dandl (as Chairman of the Council of Ministers)
- Succeeded by: Martin Segitz (acting); Johannes Hoffmann

Minister of Foreign Affairs of the People's State of Bavaria
- In office 8 November 1918 – 21 February 1919
- Preceded by: Otto Ritter von Dandl
- Succeeded by: Johannes Hoffmann

Personal details
- Born: 14 May 1867 Berlin, Brandenburg, Prussia
- Died: 21 February 1919 (aged 51) Munich, Bavaria
- Party: Independent Social Democratic Party of Germany (1917–1919); Social Democratic Party of Germany (1898–1917)
- Cabinet: Eisner

Kurt Eisner (German pronunciation: [kʊʁt ˈʔaɪsnɐ]; 14 May 1867 – 21 February 1919) was a German politician, revolutionary, journalist, and theatre critic. As a socialist journalist, he organized the socialist revolution that overthrew the Wittelsbach monarchy in Bavaria in November 1918, which led to him being described as "the symbol of the Bavarian revolution". Eisner subsequently proclaimed the People's State of Bavaria but was assassinated by far-right Bavarian nationalist Anton Graf von Arco auf Valley in Munich on 21 February 1919.

He is used as an example of charismatic authority by Max Weber.

== Life and career ==
Kurt Eisner was born in Berlin on 14 May 1867, to Emanuel Eisner and Hedwig Levenstein, both Jewish. Newspaper reports of his death identify him as being born in the Kingdom of Galicia. From 1892 to 1917 he was married to painter Elisabeth Hendrich, with whom he had five children. After they divorced Eisner married Elise Belli, an editor. With her, he had two daughters.

Eisner studied philosophy, but then became a journalist in Marburg. From 1890 to 1895, he was contributing editor of the Frankfurter Zeitung, during which time he wrote an article attacking Kaiser Wilhelm II, and for which he spent nine months in prison. Eisner was always an open republican as well as a Social-Democrat, joining the SPD in 1898, although for tactical reasons, German Social-Democracy, particularly in its later stages, rather cold-shouldered anything in the shape of republican propaganda as unnecessary and included in general Social-Democratic aims. Consequently, he fought actively for political democracy as well as Social-Democracy. He became editor of Vorwärts after the death of Wilhelm Liebknecht in 1900, but in 1905 was called upon to resign by a majority of the editorial board, which favored more orthodox Marxists. After that, his activities were confined in the main to Bavaria, though he toured other parts of Germany. He was chief editor of the Fränkische Tagespost in Nuremberg from 1907 to 1910, and afterward became a freelance journalist in Munich.

Eisner joined the Independent Social Democratic Party of Germany in 1917, at the height of World War I, and was convicted of treason in 1918 for his role in inciting a strike of munitions workers. He spent nine months in Cell 70 of Stadelheim Prison, but was released during the General Amnesty in October of that year.

After his release from prison, Eisner organized the revolution that overthrew the monarchy in Bavaria (see German Revolution). He declared Bavaria to be a free state and republic, the People's State of Bavaria, on 8 November 1918, becoming the first republican premier of Bavaria. On 23 November 1918, he leaked documents from the Bavarian plenipotentiary in Berlin during July and August 1914 that he thought proved that the war was caused by "a small horde of mad Prussian military" men as well as "allied" industrialists, capitalists, politicians, and princes. At the Berne Conference of Socialists held in Bern, Switzerland, he attacked moderate German socialists for their refusal to acknowledge Germany's part in bringing about World War I. For that speech, and for his uncompromising hostility to Prussia, he became bitterly hated by large sections of the German people.

Funeral ceremony of Kurt Eisner, Munich, 26 February 1919

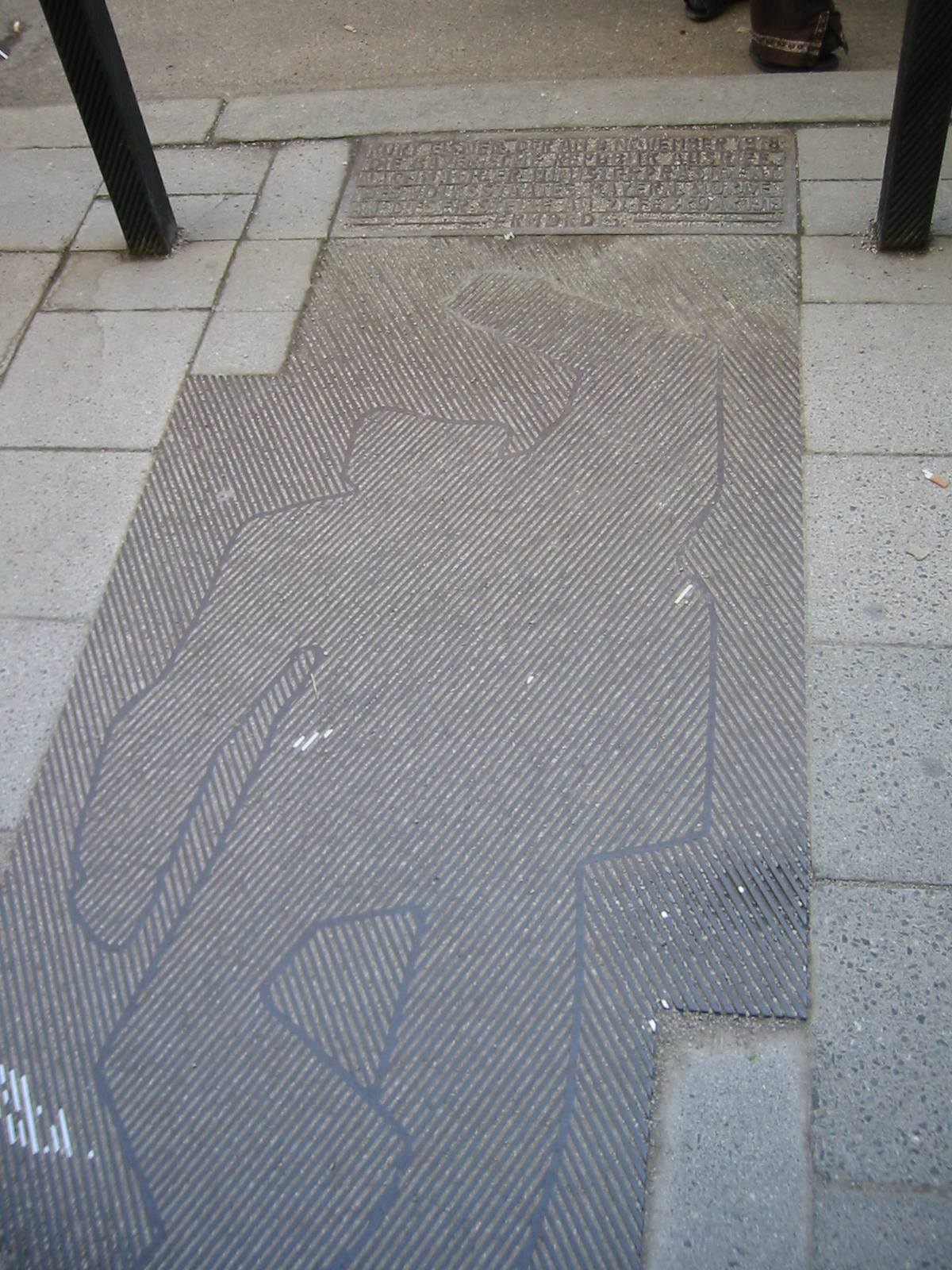
Monument to Kurt Eisner on the sidewalk where he fell when he was assassinated in Munich

== Death and legacy ==
Eisner was assassinated in Munich when German nationalist Anton Graf von Arco auf Valley shot him in the back on 21 February 1919. At the time, Eisner had been on his way to present his resignation to the Bavarian parliament. His assassination resulted in the elected government of the People's State of Bavaria fleeing Munich and the establishment of the short-lived Bavarian Soviet Republic and parliament.

Arco-Valley was tried for murder in January 1920. He was found guilty and sentenced to death, but his sentence was reduced to life imprisonment. The State Prosecutor said of him, "If the whole German youth were imbued with such a glowing enthusiasm we could face the future with confidence." He served his sentence of fortress confinement at Landsberg Prison in cell 70, and in 1924 he was evicted from his cell to make way for Adolf Hitler. He was released in 1925, and was on probation until 1927, when he was pardoned. In June 1945, Arco-Valley was killed in a traffic accident in Salzburg, after the horse-drawn carriage which he was riding in collided with a U.S. Army vehicle.

Eisner had a very large funeral with thousands of attendants coming to mourn his death. Certain authors have argued that Adolf Hitler was in attendance. A separate photo and video have been used as evidence that he was: in a photograph a man purported to be Hitler (based on physical appearance) is observing a memorial procession from the side (not participating) while Russian prisoners of war carry a portrait of Eisner. In the footage of Eisner's funeral, another man (actually participating) claimed to be Hitler can be seen wearing a black armband to symbolize the mourning of Eisner, as well as a red armband which represented support for the socialist revolution in Munich. Historians debate about the authenticity of the claim, especially with regard to the grainy footage, and Thomas Weber concluded that it was impossible to know for sure, while other historians outright dismiss it. Representatives of Hitler's unit (List Regiment) were ordered to encourage soldiers to attend a memorial procession of Eisner, but this was in April 1919 and separate from the earlier funeral in February. Author Peter den Hartog has concluded Hitler's attendance can safely be considered a "myth". As of May 1919 Hitler was an informant for the Reichswehr. The idea that Hitler attended Eisner's funeral and supported the Soviet Bavarian Republic originate with German journalist and documentarian Guido Knopp. In 2004, a group of international historians warned that documentaries like the ones produced by Knopp could reduce important historic facts to mere infotainment.

When the Passau labor union tried to stage a play about Eisner at the bishopric theater in 1920, Reichswehr soldiers and high school students sabotaged it, using weapons from the military arsenal. Among other things, 11 machine guns were used. The incident, dubbed the Passau Theater Scandal, triggered media headlines and a variety of judicial procedures.

Eisner was buried in the Munich Ostfriedhof. On 1 May 1922 the Free Trades Unions of Munich (Münchner Freien Gewerkschaften) commissioned a monument dedicated to "the Dead of the Revolution". The urn containing Eisner's ashes was walled into its pedestal. Shortly after the National Socialists took power the Monument to the Revolution was destroyed: it was demolished on 22 June 1933, and the urn with Eisner's ashes was moved to the New Jewish Cemetery, where it is still buried. The monument in the Ostfriedhof was re-created after World War II by the artist Konstantin Frick as a faithful copy of the original.

In 1989, a monument was installed in the pavement at the site of Eisner's assassination. It reads, Kurt Eisner, der am 8. November 1918 die Bayerische Republik ausrief, nachmaliger Ministerpräsident des Volksstaates Bayern, wurde an dieser Stelle am 21. Februar 1919 ermordet ("Kurt Eisner, who proclaimed the Bavarian republic on 8 November 1918 – later Prime Minister of the Republic of Bavaria – was murdered here on 21 February 1919").

== Works ==
Eisner was the author of various books and pamphlets, including:

- Psychopathia Spiritualis (1892, "Spiritual Psychopathy")
- Eine Junkerrevolte (1899, "A Junker revolt")
- Wilhelm Liebknecht (1900)
- Feste der Festlosen (1903, "Fortress of those without feasts")
- Die Neue Zeit (1919, "The New Age")

Political offices
Preceded by Otto Ritter von Dandl	Prime Minister of Bavaria; 1918–1919	Succeeded by Johannes Hoffmann
