= Law for the Protection of the Republic =

Weimar Germany law against political extremism

First Law for the Protection of the Republic Erstes Gesetz zum Schutze der Republik
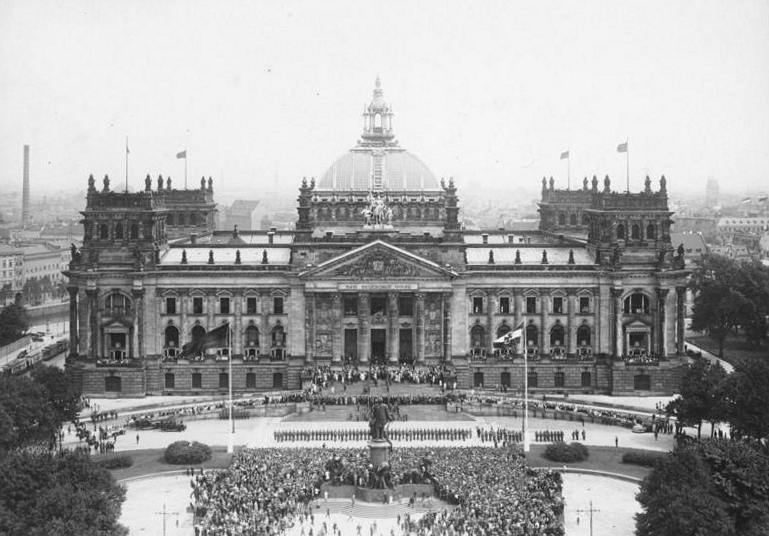

Reichstag of the Weimar Republic
- Citation: RGBl. I S. 585
- Passed: 21 July 1922
- Enacted: 23 July 1922
- Signed by: President Ebert Interior Minister Köster Justice Minister Radbruch
- Signed: 21 July 1922
- Date of expiry: 23 July 1929
- Introduced by: Reichsrat
- Voting summary: 303 voted for; 102 voted against
- Status: Expired

The Law for the Protection of the Republic (German: Gesetz zum Schutze der Republik) was the name of two laws of the Weimar Republic that banned organisations opposed to the "constitutional republican form of government" along with their printed matter and meetings. Politically motivated acts of violence such as the assassination of members of the government were made subject to more severe punishments, and a special state court was established to enforce the law's provisions.

The immediate cause for enacting the first law was the assassination of Foreign Minister Walther Rathenau on 24 June 1922 by members of the right-wing extremist group Organisation Consul. The First Law for the Protection of the Republic, passed in July 1922, was extended for two years in 1927 and expired in 1929. The slightly modified Second Law for the Protection of the Republic was in effect from 1930 to 1932.

The first law violated the Weimar Constitution in several regards, most notably because the new state court was technically an illegal special court set up alongside the German High Court. The law could be enacted only because it passed in the Reichstag by a two-thirds majority, the margin that was required to change the constitution. The second law did not contain any unconstitutional elements and passed by a simple majority.

== First law ==
=== Origin ===
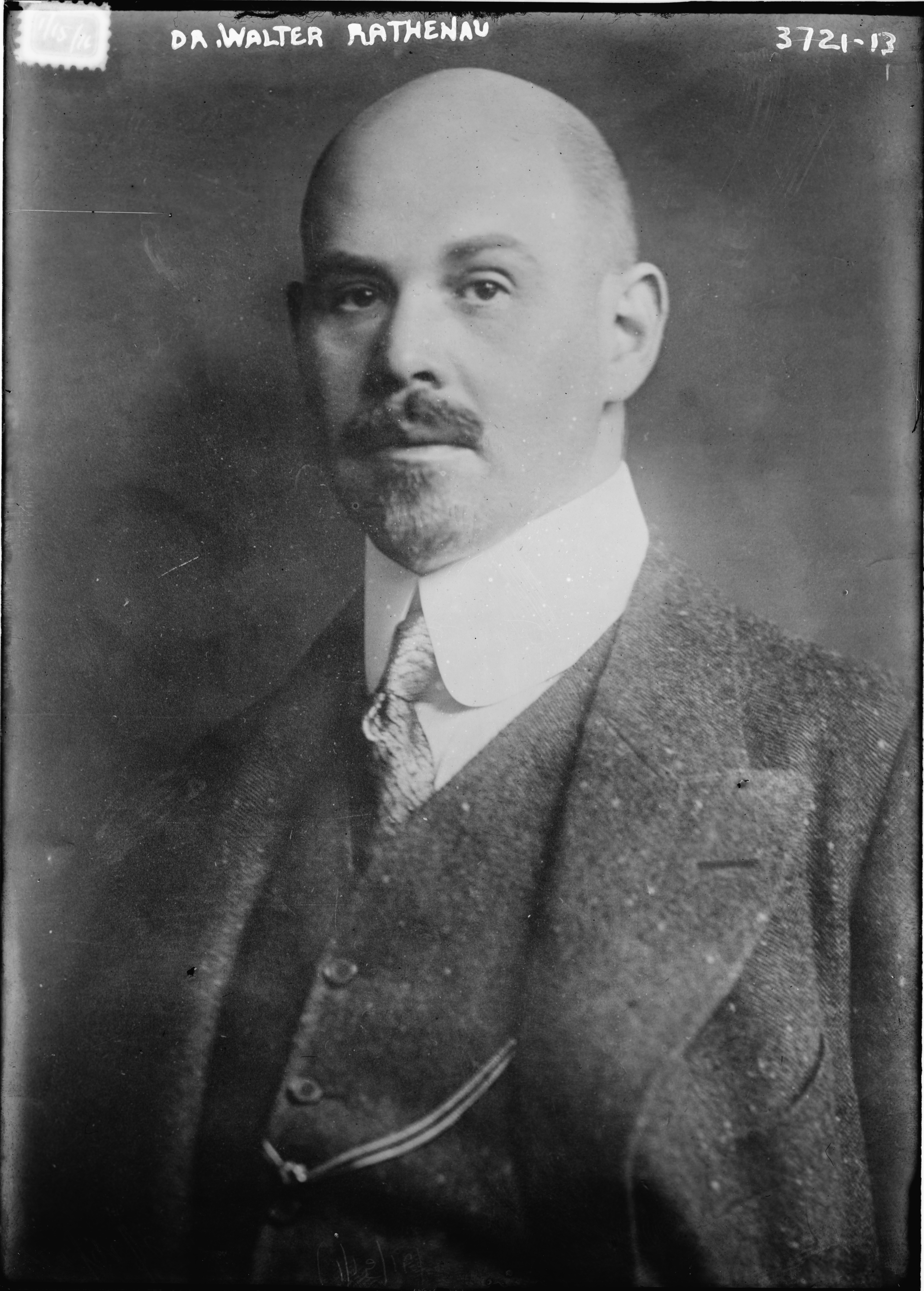
Foreign Minister Walther Rathenau, whose assassination by right-wing extremists in 1922 led to passage of the First Law for the Protection of the Republic

The news of the assassination of Foreign Minister Walther Rathenau on 24 June 1922 led to tumult in the German Reichstag. The anger was directed in particular against Karl Helfferich of the German National People's Party (DNVP) who had delivered a tirade against Rathenau the day before his assassination. He and the representatives of the anti-republican right were received into the chamber with shouts of "murderers!" from members of the parties of the centre and left. On 25 June, Chancellor Joseph Wirth of the Centre Party made a speech during which he turned toward the right-wing members of the Reichstag, specifically Helfferich, and declared,

There stands the enemy who drips his poison into the wounds of a people. There stands the enemy, and there is no doubt about it: The enemy stands on the right!

A number of decrees for the protection of the Republic preceded the first law. They were issued by President Friedrich Ebert in 1921 and again in 1922 immediately after Rathenau's assassination. Disputes about them arose within the Wirth government and in the Reichstag because Minister of Justice Gustav Radbruch and Chancellor Wirth interpreted them as directed against right-wing radicalism only.

The government nevertheless wanted to turn the content of the ordinances immediately into a law. The draft worked out in the ministries of Justice and the Interior was met with some initial scepticism. Wilhelm Marx of the Centre Party expressed concern that the Reichstag was reacting to an exceptional case with an exceptional law rather than an emergency decree. The state of Bavaria had the most extensive reservations. Minister President Hugo von Lerchenfeld argued that the law was improperly directed only against extremism from the right, that it encompassed earlier offences retroactively, that former members of the federal government should not be implicated, and that the bill curtailed the rights of the states by making a federal authority responsible for certain offences rather than state authorities.

Bavaria's criticisms were supported only by Württemberg. In a meeting with the minister presidents of the states on 29 June, the government was dissuaded from the idea of having the Reichstag introduce the bill. It was initiated instead in the Reichsrat, the representative body of the states. After some amendments, the Reichsrat adopted the bill on 3 July by 48 votes to 10. The text had been reworded to remove the one-sided orientation towards the right, so that radical left-wing activities were also included. Instead of the "republican form of government" or, as Bavaria wanted, the "constitutional form of government", the law protected the "constitutional republican form of government". During the third reading in the Reichstag, the wording was finalized as "the constitutionally established republican form of government". The right-wing parties in the Reichstag criticized the law's emergency provisions, the Court of Special Exceptions and the provisions directed against the former territorial princes. The latter provided that members of the former ruling families who were living abroad could be prohibited from entering Germany or have their place of residence restricted – a provision that clearly included the former German emperor, Wilhelm II.

On 18 July, 303 deputies voted in favour of the law, 102 against, and four abstained. The yes votes came unanimously from the Social Democrats (SPD), the Independent Social Democrats (USPD), German Democratic Party (DDP) and Centre Party, plus a majority from the German People's Party (DVP). The German National People's Party (DNVP), Communist Party (KPD), Bavarian People's Party (BVP) and Bavarian Peasants' League voted against. There was less support for the associated Law on the Duties of Civil Servants for the Protection of the Republic. Both laws received a two-thirds majority, which was necessary for passing a law that violated the constitution (the Reichstag could amend the constitution with a two-thirds majority). The retroactive assignment of jurisdiction to the State Court was unconstitutional because it deprived the accused of the (normally responsible) "lawful judge", and the civil servants act affected their "vested rights".

=== Contents ===
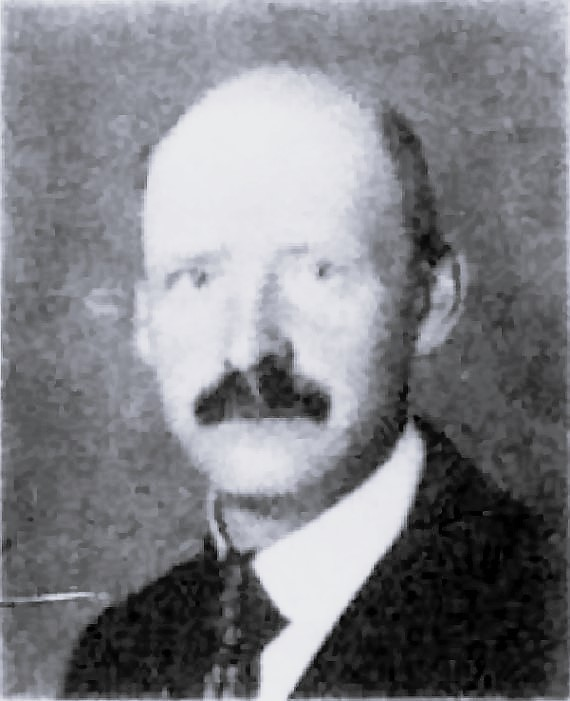
Legal scholar Dr. Gustav Radbruch (SPD), Germany's minister of justice when the First Law for the Protection of the Republic was drawn up and implemented

The law was divided into six sections:

==== I. Penal Provisions for the Protection of the Republic ====
Prison terms and/or fines were set for "whoever participates in a secret or anti-state association which attempts to undermine the constitutionally established republican form of government of the Reich or of a state, or supports it or … a member with advice and action, in particular with money". Similar penalties applied to those who publicly insulted the government, its members or its colours, or who joined a secret or anti-state association which possessed weapons without authorization or plotted to assassinate a government member. Anyone who belonged to an association that carried out an attempt to assassinate a member of the government, or who knew of such an organization and did not report it, was to receive life imprisonment or the death penalty.

==== II. State Court for the Protection of the Republic ====
The State Court prosecuted cases whose penalties were outlined in Section I. The court consisted of 3 members of the German High Court and 6 persons named by the president of Germany. Normal rules of criminal procedure applied. If the alleged offense was against a state, the state had to request that the case be tried by the State Court.

==== III. Prohibited Associations ====
"Meetings, processions and demonstrations may be prohibited if certain facts exist which justify the concern that discussions are taking place in them which constitute the offence of one of the punishable acts." The associations that sponsored such activities – or that "pursue the elevation of a particular person to the throne" – could be prohibited. If requested, the government had to give the reasons for the prohibition, and the prohibition could be appealed.

==== IV. Confiscation and Prohibition of Printed Matter ====
Printed matter that fell under the penalties of Section I could be confiscated and the periodical behind it banned for a maximum of six months. The person responsible could be imprisoned for up to five years and fined up to 500,000 marks.

==== V. Members of Former Sovereign Families ====
Members of Germany's former ruling families who were living abroad could be prohibited from entering Germany or have their place of residence restricted "if the concern is justified that otherwise the welfare of the Republic will be endangered". Reasons for the government's action had to be provided and could be appealed.

==== VI. Final Provisions ====
The law took force upon enactment and expired after five years.

=== Additional laws ===
Other laws and ordinances came into force along with the Law for the Protection of the Republic on 21 July 1922. The Act on the Duties of Civil Servants for the Protection of the Republic required that civil servants be loyal to the Weimar Constitution. The Reich Criminal Police Act established a Reich Criminal Police Office and state police offices. They were charged with the detection and prevention of criminal offences, including matters involving the protection of the state. The Reich Criminal Police Office dealt with cross-state cases.

A law on immunity from prosecution regulated an amnesty for high treason (commonly called the "Rathenau Amnesty"). It affected cases from 1920, when the previous immunity law was enacted following the Kapp Putsch, through the end of 1921. The treasonable undertakings given amnesty were not allowed to be connected with serious crimes involving death or bodily harm. The law benefited only left-wing radicals and was a concession to the Independent Social Democrats and the Communist Party, whose votes were needed to pass the Law for the Protection of the Republic and the Civil Servants Law.

=== Conflict with Bavaria ===
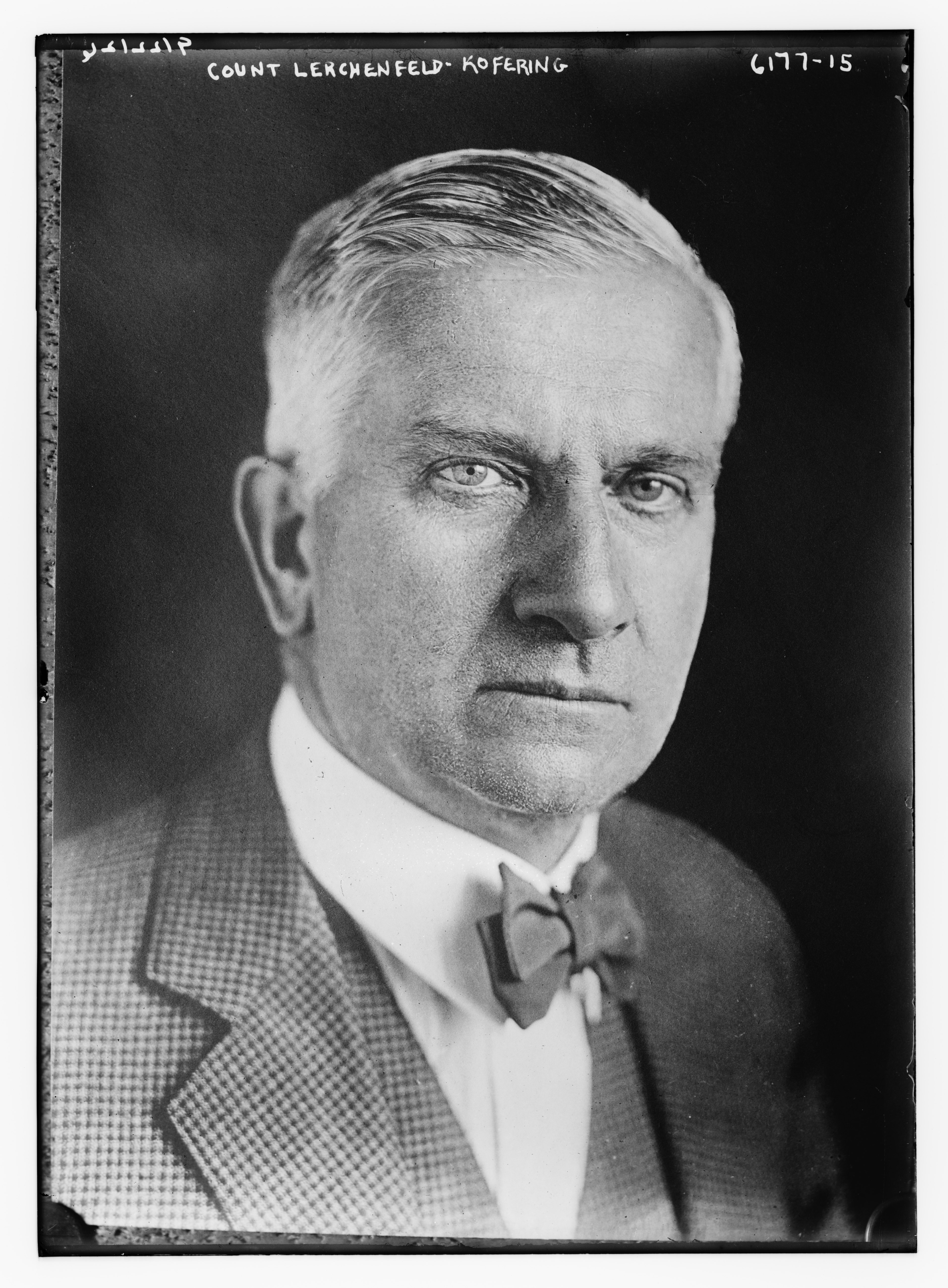
Minister President Lerchenfeld of Bavaria, who negotiated altered terms for the Law for the Protection of the Republic as it applied in Bavaria

The Bavarian state government came into serious conflict with the federal government over the law. Minister President Lerchenfeld announced on 9 July that the measures would not be applied in Bavaria. He repeated his earlier criticisms and complained of a "politicisation of the administration of criminal justice". After the law came into effect on 23 July, the state government issued its own Bavarian decree. It gave jurisdiction for criminal cases to the Bavarian People's Court and granted the Bavarian minister of the Interior the power to ban associations and assemblies as necessary.

Berlin could have responded with a Reichsexekution – a federal intervention against a member state, using military force if necessary – or an appeal to the German High Court. The federal government and Bavaria instead agreed on a protocol on 11 August with concessions from both sides. Bavaria abandoned its decree, while Berlin made promises on how to proceed with the Law for the Protection of the Republic:

- Cases of minor importance were referred to the Bavarian authorities.
- The Bavarian People's Court dealt with cases that were already pending.
- The chief federal prosecutor cooperated with the state authorities and called in officials from outside the state only if the state authorities agreed.
- The State Court was to be staffed with judges who came from the various regions of Germany.
- The State Court was to be divided into senates. This amounted de facto to setting up a southern German senate to deal with southern German cases.
- The Berlin government confirmed its commitment to the federal principle and pledged that it would not transfer the states' sovereign rights to the Reich.

=== Modifications ===
The Civil Servants Act and the Reich Criminal Police Act had no expiration dates. The Law for the Protection of the Republic was valid for five years, until 23 July 1927. In March and April 1926, the Reichstag passed two amending acts. The State Court no longer had jurisdiction over criminal cases, and some penalties were reduced. Expulsion, for example, was changed from a mandatory to an optional provision.

In the summer of 1927, leading up to the end of the law's 5-year legal life, the subject of an extension came up for debate in the Reichstag. Due to the increased number of seats held by the German National People's Party, which had voted against the law in 1922, it needed to support the extension in order for it to pass. Since the DNVP was part of the government coalition and Chancellor Wilhelm Marx and the Centre Party insisted on the extension, the DNVP agreed after securing a number of concessions: the extension would last only two years and the State Court would be abolished, with the High Court taking over jurisdiction. Two years later, when the DNVP was again in opposition, it rejected a second extension, as did the Nazi Party, the Reich Party of the German Middle Class and the Communist Party. In the vote on 28 June 1929, the motion to extend the law until 31 December 1930 failed 263 to 166, short of the 287 votes required for a two-thirds majority. The law expired on 23 July 1929.

Second Law for the Protection of the Republic Zweites Gesetz zum Schutze der Republik
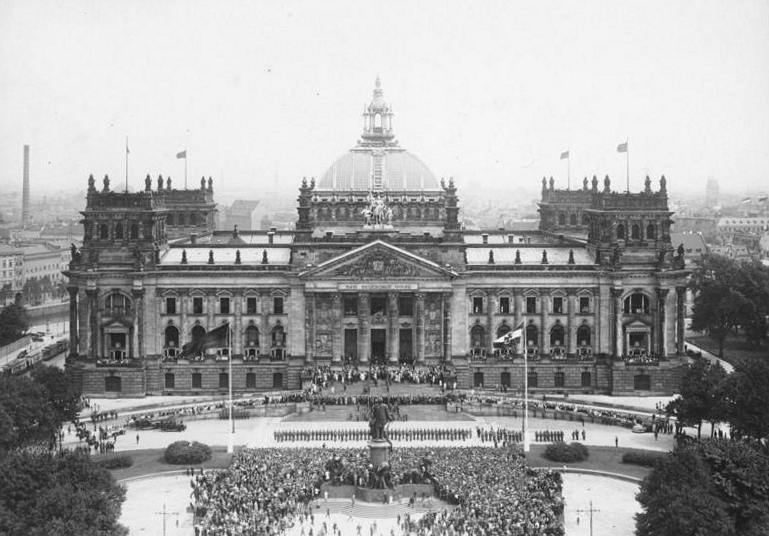

Reichstag of the Weimar Republic
- Passed: 18 March 1930
- Enacted: 26 March 1930
- Signed by: President Hindenburg Interior Minister Severing Justice Minister Guérard
- Signed: 25 March 1930
- Date of expiry: 19 December 1932
- Introduced by: Second Müller cabinet
- Voting summary: 265 voted for; 150 voted against
- Status: Expired

== Second Law for the Protection of the Republic ==
As a result of an increase in politically motivated violence, the government of Hermann Müller (SPD) presented the Reichstag with a draft of a new version of the Law for the Protection of the Republic in December 1929. Since there was no chance of the bill receiving a two-thirds majority in the Reichstag, the clauses from the First Law that violated the Constitution were taken out, including Section V, the provision regarding the former sovereigns (the "Emperor Paragraph"). On 18 March 1930, the Second Law for the Protection of the Republic passed in the Reichstag with 265 votes in favour (SPD, German Democratic Party (DDP), German People's Party (DVP), Bavarian People's Party (BVP), Centre and German Peasants' Party), and 150 votes against (the German National People's Party (DNVP), Reich Party of the German Middle Class, German-Hanoverian Party, Nazi Party and Communist Party (KPD)).

The government did not include an expiration date in the draft, but the final version of the law stipulated that it expire on 31 December 1932. On 19 December 1932, President Paul von Hindenburg issued an emergency decree stating that the law would expire ten days earlier, in favour of a new, permanent state protection decree (Decree of the Reich President for the Preservation of Internal Peace of 19 December 1932).

The second law differed from the first in some respects, such as dropping the special protection under criminal law for members of the government. In essence, however, the provisions remained the same. The Second Law for the Protection of the Republic had less effect than the first due mainly to the political situation. Heightened threats of punishment had little effect given the increased radicalisation of the public, and the conflicts between the federal government and the states prevented the cooperation on constitutional protection on which the law was based. Of even greater importance were the emergency decrees issued by the president under the presidential cabinets of Heinrich Brüning, Franz von Papen and Kurt von Schleicher.

== Use of the laws ==
The imperial German war ensign, used by the Organisation Consul as its flag

The Organisation Consul, the group behind Rathenau's assassination, was promptly banned under the First Law, and a quick series of successful searches brought to an end to the series of political murders for which it was responsible. Thirteen individuals were sentenced to prison in October 1922 for aiding and abetting the murder of Walther Rathenau, but the court ruled that a conspiracy was unproven. In a 1924 trial of a number of other members of the Organisation Consul, none was convicted.

By early 1923, the states of Prussia, Saxony, Baden, Thuringia, Schaumburg-Lippe, Mecklenburg-Schwerin, Hamburg, Bremen and Hesse had banned the Nazi Party under the provisions of the law. In March, the Supreme Court upheld all prohibitions of the party in locations where it had been active in 1922. The Nazi newspaper the Völkischer Beobachter was also banned. In the trial of Adolf Hitler for his part in the failed 1923 Beer Hall Putsch, the court refused to apply the provisions of the Law for the Protection of the Republic to "a man who thinks and feels as German as Hitler". The law would have required that he be deported to Austria as a foreigner convicted of high treason.

Other right-wing extremist organizations that were banned under the law included the Deutschvölkischer Schutz- und Trutzbund (German Nationalist Protection and Defiance Federation) and the Young German Order. Among the German states, Prussia was particularly forceful in imposing bans, Bavaria the least so.

Overall, the law did not have the impact that its framers had hoped. The banned groups, including the Nazi Party, often simply camouflaged themselves as different organizations, or the members joined other still active groups. Many judges, especially after the State Court was abolished in 1926, showed a clear bias in favour of right-wing anti-republican ideas and refused to convict those accused of right-wing activities.
