= Free State of Bavaria (Weimar Republic) =

German state (1919–1933)

Free State of Bavaria (Weimar Republic) Freistaat Bayern
- State of Germany
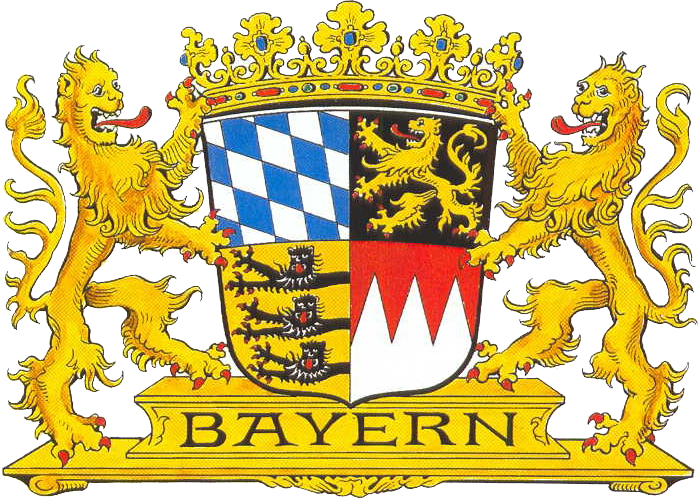
- Flag Coat of arms

- The Free State of Bavaria (red) within the Weimar Republic. The exclave is the Rhenish Palatinate.

Anthem
- Bayernhymne
- Capital: Munich
- Demonym: Bavarian
- Area
  - Coordinates: 49°N 11.5°E
  - 1925: 75,996 km^{2} (29,342 sq mi)
- Population
  - 1925: 7,379,594
- Government
  - Type: Republic
- Minister-President
  - 1918–1919 (first): Kurt Eisner
  - 1924–1933 (last): Heinrich Held
- Legislature: Landtag
- Historical era: Interwar
  - Established: 7 November 1918
  - Constitution enacted: 15 September 1919
  - Gleichschaltung: 7 April 1933
Preceded by	Succeeded by
Kingdom of Bavaria; German Empire	Nazi Germany
- Today part of: Germany

The Free State of Bavaria (German: Freistaat Bayern) (1919–1933) was one of the constituent states of the federally organized Weimar Republic. The Free State was established in November 1918 and lasted until the Nazi regime absorbed all of Germany's federal states in April 1933. Following the end of World War II, the name "Free State of Bavaria" was taken up again in the Bavarian constitution of 1946. It remains Bavaria's official name today.

The Free State of Bavaria (Note: After the fall of the monarchy, the state was alternatively called German: Volksstaat (People's State), Freistaat (Free State), Freier Volksstaat (Free People's State of Bavaria), or Republik (Republic). The Eisner government preferred the term German: Volksstaat, while the Hoffmann government preferred Freistaat, emphatically rejecting not just monarchy but any kind of dictatorial rule. For further discussion of the terms see Free state: Germany.) grew out of the German Empire's defeat in World War I and the German revolution of 1918–1919. King Ludwig III of Bavaria fled in the face of mass protests in November 1918, and workers' and soldiers' councils under the leadership of Kurt Eisner took over in Munich and Bavaria's other large cities. The Eisner government promised a non-revolutionary transition to socialism. Shortly after Eisner's party placed last among the major parties in the election for a state constitutional assembly, he was assassinated by a right-wing extremist. In March 1919, a new government was formed under the moderate socialist Johannes Hoffmann, but on 6 April the declaration of the Bavarian Soviet Republic forced it to flee Munich. After government and Freikorps troops violently suppressed the soviets, the Hoffmann government returned to Munich and enacted a republican constitution which officially made the Free State of Bavaria part of the Weimar Republic.

During the March 1920 Kapp Putsch in Berlin, Hoffmann was replaced by Gustav Ritter von Kahr. Intent on creating a Bavarian "cell of order", Kahr sparked a crisis with the federal government when he refused to obey certain of its directives. In November 1923, Adolf Hitler initiated his Beer Hall Putsch in Munich, in part to forestall similar plans by Kahr. Although the putsch failed, Hitler won considerable sympathy in Bavaria. The Free State became a focal point for right-wing extremists from across Germany.

In the mid to late 1920s, Bavaria enjoyed a short-lived period of political and economic stability (the "Golden Twenties"). It ended in 1929 with the onset of the Great Depression. High unemployment and economic privation led to a resurgence of radical parties, most notably the Nazis. After Adolf Hitler became German chancellor in January 1933, Bavaria's anti-Nazi political leadership was replaced by Franz von Epp as Reich commissioner for Bavaria. The two Gleichschaltung (synchronization) laws of March and April 1933 brought Bavaria and all the other German states fully under Nazi control and effectively ended both the Weimar Republic and the Free State of Bavaria.

== World War I ==
In the weeks leading up to the outbreak of World War I, the Kingdom of Bavaria was, for the most part, patriotic and pro-war in the spirit of 1914. When King Ludwig III mobilized the Bavarian Army on 1 August 1914, the crowd that had gathered to listen was jubilant. The popular mood soured rapidly as the expected quick victory failed to materialize and the war economy increasingly affected daily life. Coal and food shortages developed, and farmers struggled with the loss of their young men and horses and with shortages of fertilizer and farm equipment. Tensions mounted when city dwellers began going to the countryside to forage for food, and there were accusations of hoarding. To the farmers especially, the rationing of food amid local crop surpluses felt like harassment, and hatred of Prussia, the Empire's dominant state, grew.

Bavarians in its cities and towns suffered under not just the food and coal shortages but also the lack of workers and materials in industry and trade. Many women went to work to fill the open positions and to earn money to feed their families. The politics of the lower middle classes shifted to the left, generally to the moderate Social Democratic Party (SPD). The more leftist and anti-war Independent Social Democratic Party (USPD) had relatively few followers in Bavaria, although its chairman, Kurt Eisner, was quite popular. He was arrested during the suppression of the January 1918 strike, which involved more than one million workers across Germany, including 10,000 from Munich's munitions plants. Eisner was released from prison in mid-October.

As the war neared its end, criticism of Bavaria's leaders for neglecting its interests and not standing up to Prussia increased. At the beginning of the war, King Ludwig had looked forward to Bavaria gaining territory, specifically hoping to acquire Alsace–Lorraine, part of which was adjacent to the Bavarian exclave of the Rhenish Palatinate. Crown Prince Rupprecht, who had originally favored German plans for annexations, began to call for a negotiated peace in 1916, but even in the summer of 1918, after the failure of the German spring offensive, King Ludwig was urging Bavarians to hold out: "It is important to continue to fight, to continue to take all hardships and deprivations upon ourselves in the certain confidence that God will lead our just cause to victory" (July 28).

Approximately 200,000 Bavarian soldiers lost their lives in the war.

== German revolution ==
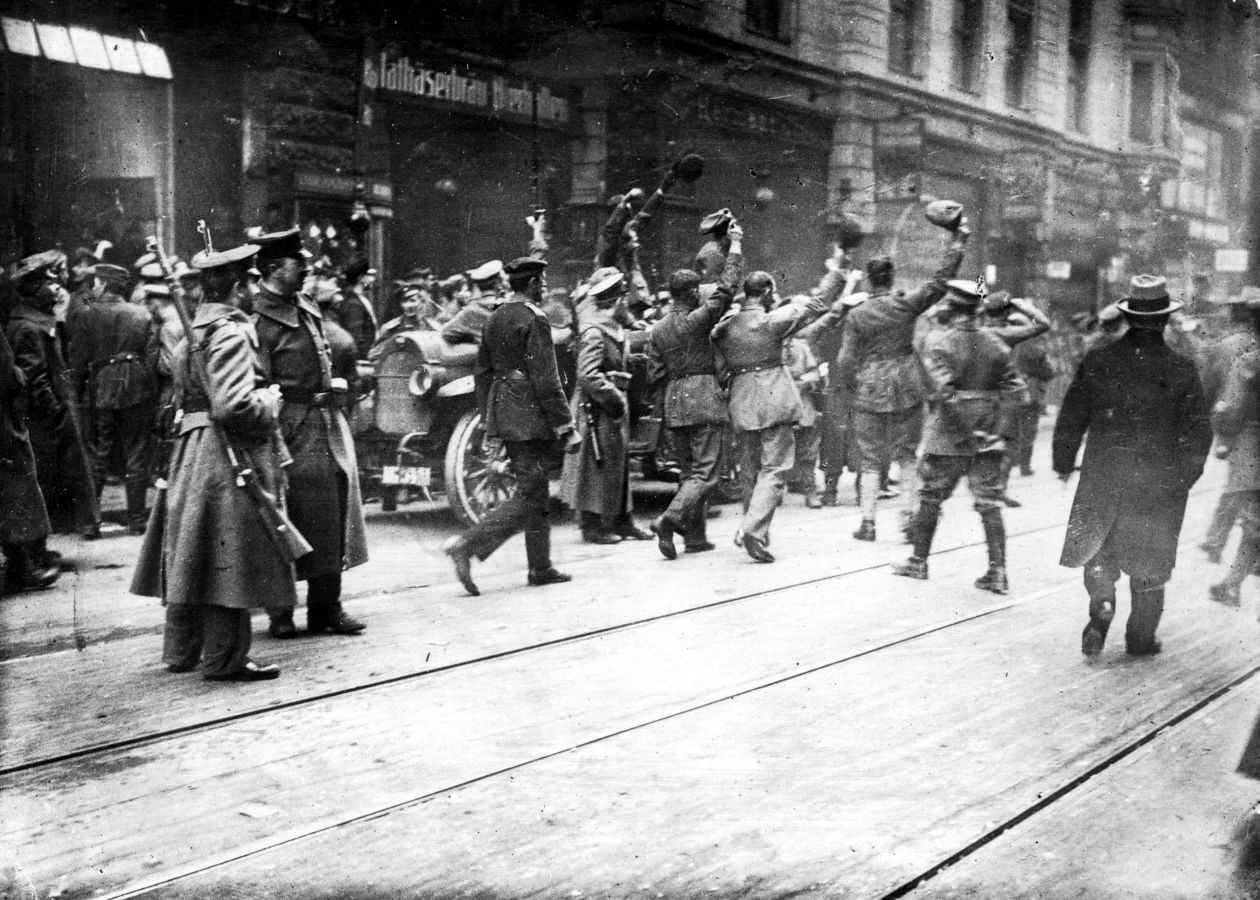
Soldiers in Munich after the proclamation of the republic

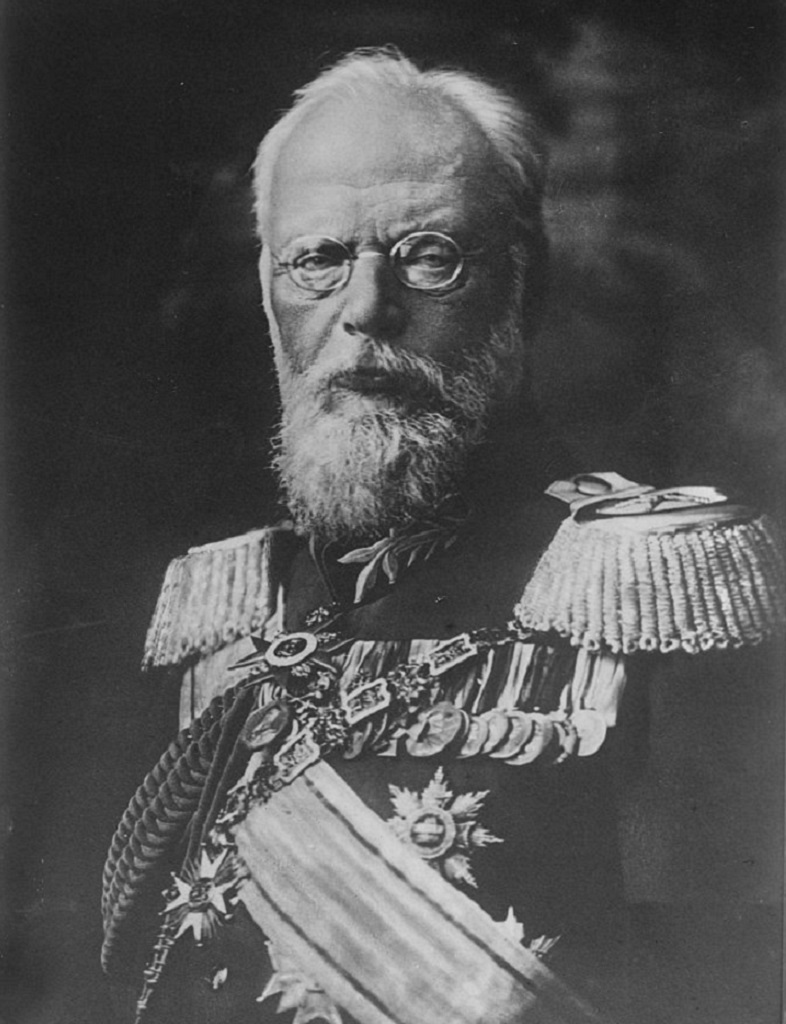
King Ludwig III. He was the first of Germany's monarchs to lose his throne during the German revolution.

The German revolution of 1918–1919 began at the end of October 1918 with the Kiel mutiny. Rebellious sailors set up a revolutionary workers' and soldiers' council at Kiel and in early November spread the revolt across Germany. Councils took power from the existing military, royal and civil authorities with little resistance or bloodshed. The revolution reached Berlin on 9 November, and Emperor Wilhelm II fled to Holland the next day.

In Bavaria, protests initiated by the radical left Independent Social Democratic Party of Germany (USPD) began in Munich on 3 November 1918, the first anniversary of the Russian Revolution. The demonstrators called for an immediate peace and demanded the release of detained leaders. On the afternoon of 7 November 1918, the moderate left Social Democratic Party (SPD), USPD and Free Trade Unions sponsored a mass rally on Munich's Theresienwiese estimated to have been attended by from 40,000 to 60,000 people. One of the speakers, Kurt Eisner of the USPD, demanded the abdications of King Ludwig III of Bavaria and German emperor Wilhelm II, the democratisation of Germany, comprehensive social welfare and an eight-hour workday. After the speeches, the SPD led a march through the city, then had its supporters disperse. Eisner, along with Felix Fechenbach (USPD) and Ludwig Gandorfer of the Bavarian Peasants' League, used the opportunity to lead a band of about 1,000 to the army barracks in the north of Munich. There, they were able to convince the majority of the soldiers to join them. The strengthened group returned to the center of the city, where they occupied key locations such as the railway station, telegraph office and the Bavarian Landtag (parliament) building.

That evening, the revolutionary soldiers and workers formed a workers' and soldiers' council and elected Eisner its chairman. They then went to the Landtag building, where shortly before midnight Eisner proclaimed the formation of the Free State of Bavaria and the end of the Wittelsbach monarchy. He promised that the government would maintain order, call an election for a Bavarian constituent assembly, guarantee property and retain its civil servants. King Ludwig had already fled Munich in the evening. On 12 November, at the Anif Palace in Salzburg, Austria, he signed the Anif declaration in which he released all Bavarian civil servants and military personnel from their oath of loyalty to him. Although he did not use the word "abdication", his declaration ended the 738-year dynasty of the House of Wittelsbach.

The revolution spread within a few days to Bavaria's other large cities. Following the pattern set in Munich, workers' and soldiers' councils were set up in Nuremberg, Fürth, Erlangen, Augsburg, Würzburg and Ludwigshafen. Most of the cities' government officials cooperated with the councils and stayed in office. In Bavaria's rural areas, the revolution made few inroads. They remained almost fully under the old governmental structures.

The revolution in Bavaria took place so swiftly and peacefully in large part because the people were either indifferent to it or willing to let it happen. The great majority of Bavarians were still suffering under the war's hardships – the Allied blockade of Germany, which included foodstuffs, did not end until July 1919 – and were focused on seeing themselves and their families through the difficult times. King Ludwig had lost the people's trust because he was seen as weak and indecisive and had not been able to remedy the problem of food shortages. Many also thought that he had not done enough to protect the Kingdom's special sovereignty within the Empire. Hatred of Prussia, with its long history in Bavaria, had grown stronger during the war.

There were also structural issues pre-dating the war, which eased the course of the revolution across all of Germany. They included the social effects of industrialisation and the growth of the workers' and women's movements. The sudden and – for the German public – unexpected loss of the war was a shock to their confidence in the imperial and monarchical forms of government. That, combined with the hope that parliamentarization would help Germany secure better peace terms, played a significant role in the public's readiness to let the revolution happen.

=== Eisner government ===
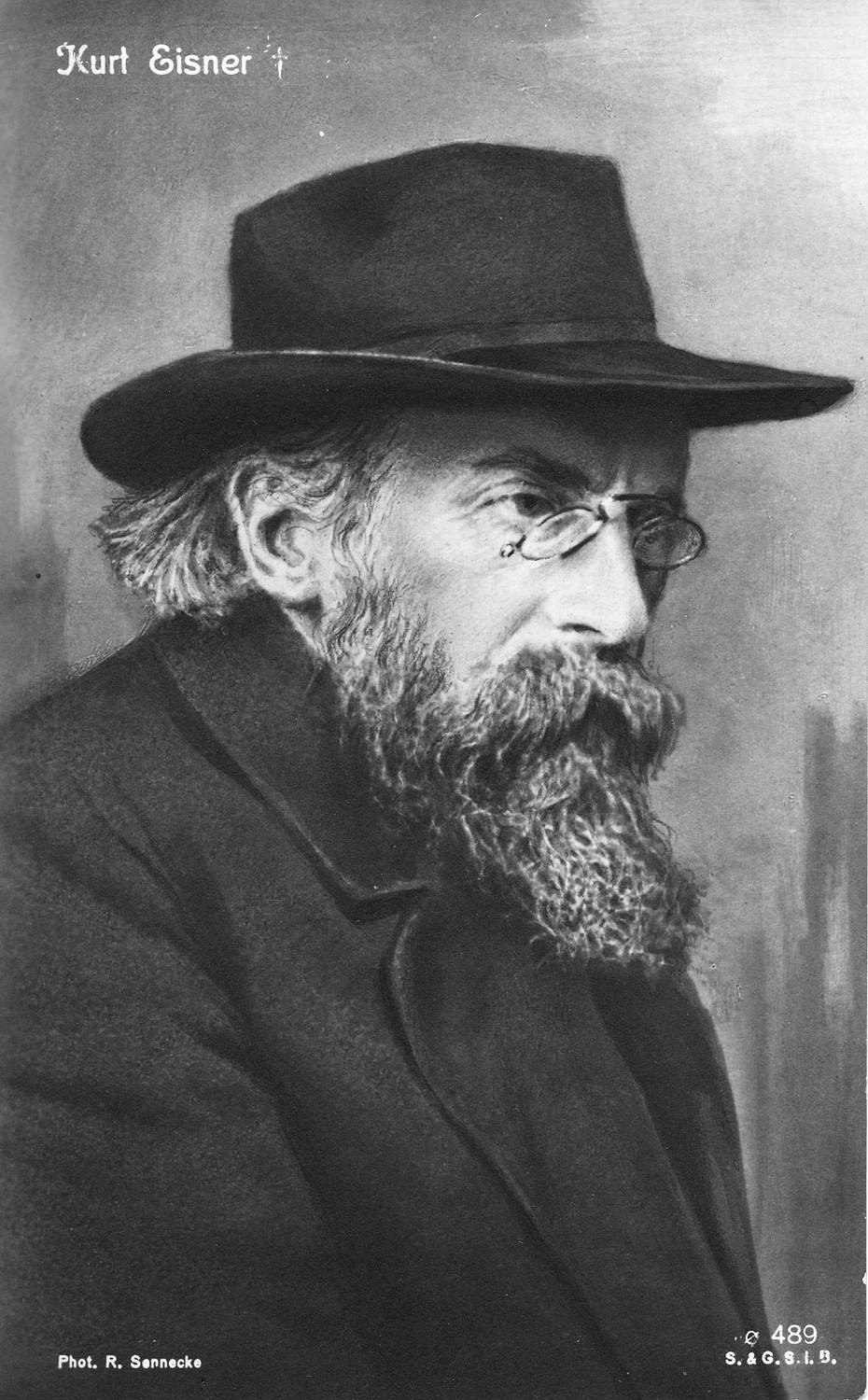
Kurt Eisner, the driving force behind the first phase of the German revolution in Bavaria

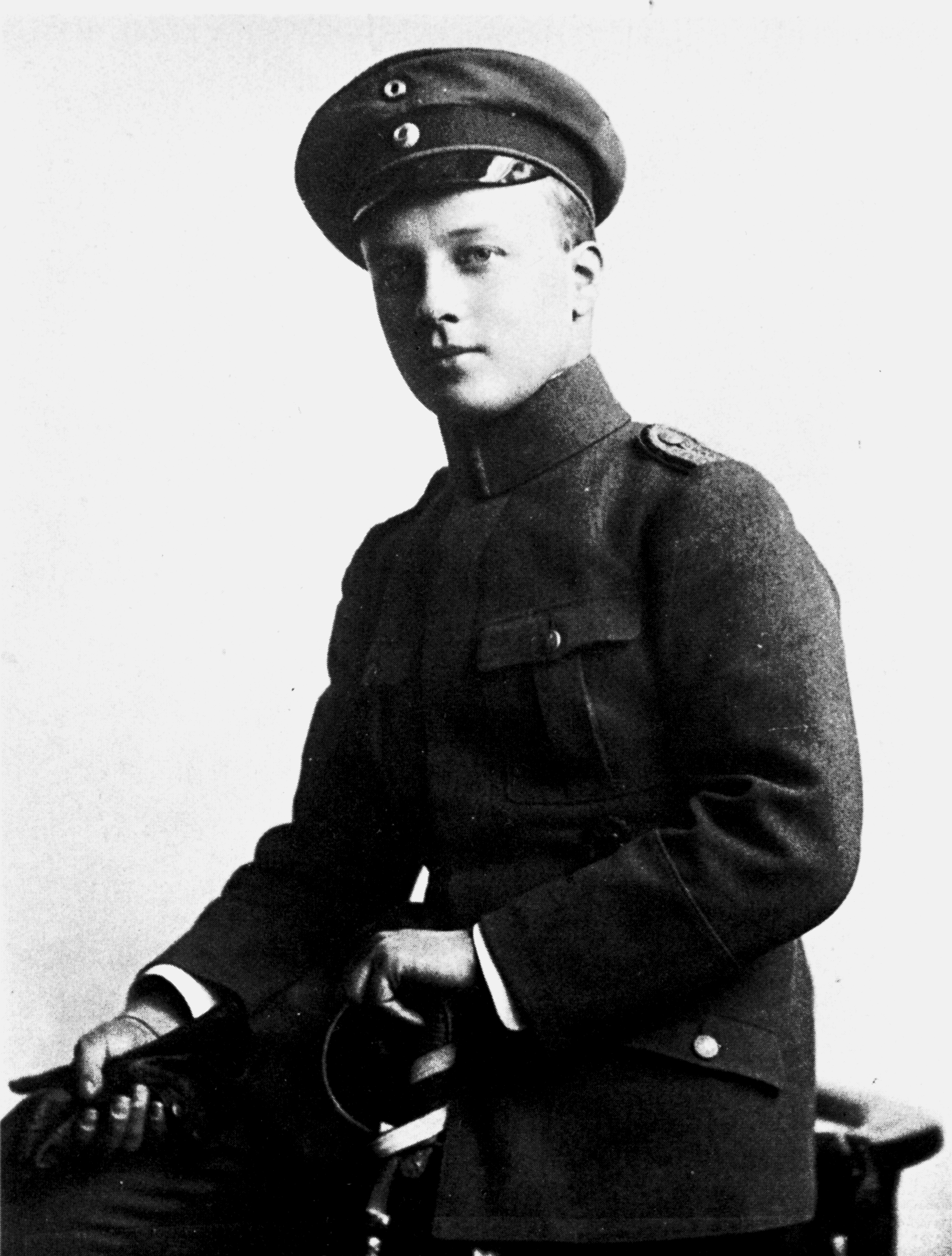
Anton Graf von Arco auf Valley, the assassin of Kurt Eisner. He served less than five years in prison for the killing.

In Munich, Erhard Auer at the head of the SPD leadership met with representatives of the unions on the morning of 8 November and decided that the best way to moderate the revolutionary forces under Eisner was to take part in his new government. Eisner agreed to work with the SPD and the middle-class parties as long as they accepted the new form of government and that the workers', soldiers' and peasants' councils were the holders of state power. After they reached an agreement, they filled out a list of ministers. It was completed the same afternoon and presented to the provisional National Council (Nationalrat), which was made up of members of the pre-revolutionary Landtag and of the workers', soldiers' and peasants' councils. The National Council had little function other than to give the new government a veneer of legitimacy. The new government consisted of three USPD members, with Eisner as minister-president, three SPD members and one independent.

The Eisner government quickly stated its goals. It renounced any significant state takeover of industry and emphasized urgent needs such as increasing the food supply, handling demobilization and creating jobs. It also advocated the separation of church and state and a strongly federal Germany which would include German-Austria. Even though Eisner was against a Soviet-style council republic, he saw a role for the workers', soldiers' and peasants' councils in his government. He pushed to have them oversee public administration, work towards a transformation to socialism and help to democratise the masses of the people. In an attempt to show the outside world the extent of the change in the new Germany, he published imperial files which showed the old regime's responsibility for the start of World War I. The political right saw his action as treasonous, and it roused considerable hatred against him.

1919 Constituent Assembly election results
Party	Seats	Pct. of Votes
Bavarian People's Party (BVP)	66	35.0
Social Democratic Party (SPD)	61	33.0
German Democratic Party (DDP)	25	14.0
Bavarian Peasants' League (BB)	16	9.1
National Liberal Party in Bavaria and Bavarian Middle Party	9	5.8
Independent Social Democratic Party (USPD)	3	2.5
Others	0	0.6

One of the central provisions of the goal statement, the promise of an early election for a Bavarian constituent assembly, proved to be the most problematic within the Eisner government. While the SPD wanted an election to take place as soon as possible in order to establish a democratically legitimized government, Eisner tried to delay the date for the election to have time to prepare for a more complete change in the political system. Despite his protests, it was set for 12 January 1919 (2 February in the Palatinate). The election took place amid deteriorating conditions in Munich. The Eisner government had almost no security forces, the demands of the workers', soldiers' and peasants' councils were growing louder, and the political right had regrouped following the fall of the monarchy. Numerous death threats were made against both SPD leader Erhard Auer and Eisner. The first deaths of the revolution in Bavaria occurred during a demonstration against unemployment on 7 January. On 19 February, 600 armed sailors, most of them Bavarians, attempted to overthrow the Eisner government (the Lotter putsch, named after its leader), but they were quickly defeated.

The election was a disaster for Eisner and the USPD. Its last place finish among the major parties, with just 2.5% of the vote, showed that it was little more than a splinter party. The clear winners were the Catholic Bavarian People's Party, a more conservative breakaway in November 1918 from the Centre Party, with 35% of the vote, and the SPD at 33%. The liberal German Democratic Party (DDP) was third with 14%.

The USPD's poor showing left the government badly weakened. The SPD began working towards forming a new government, and the cabinet, after some effort, convinced Eisner to resign. He planned to make the announcement at the opening session of the constituent assembly on 21 February, but while on his way to the Landtag building he was assassinated by the extreme right-wing ex-officer Anton Graf von Arco auf Valley. Shortly afterwards, in the Landtag building, Alois Lindner, a member of the revolutionary workers' council, shot and wounded Erhard Auer in the belief that he shared responsibility for Eisner's death. A BVP member of the assembly and an officer who tried to restrain Linder were killed at the same time. The meeting of the constituent assembly broke up in panic.

=== First Hoffmann government ===
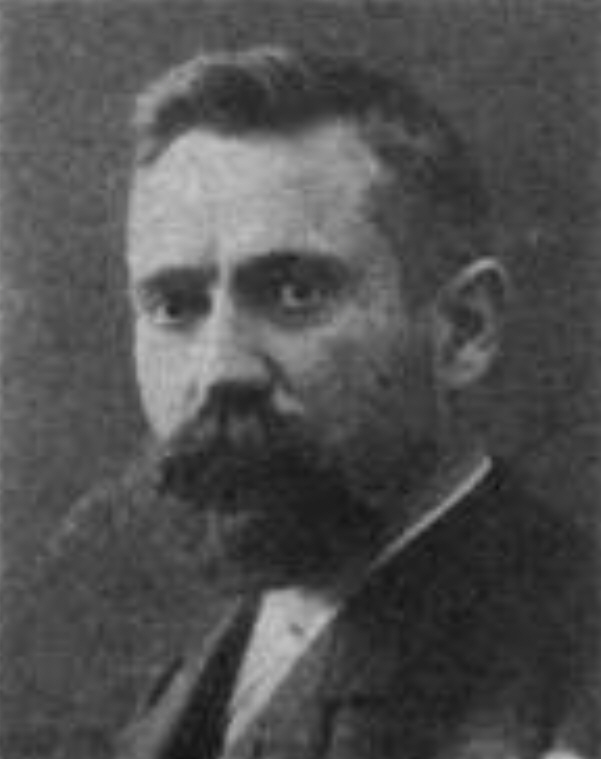
Johannes Hoffmann, Bavaria's minister-president after Eisner's assassination

A general meeting of Munich councils on 22 February 1919 elected a Bavarian Central Council with representatives from the SPD, USPD, Communist Party of Germany (KPD) and peasants' councils under the leadership of Ernst Niekisch (SPD). On 28 February, the Central Council called a congress of Bavarian councils at which the SPD refused to take part in a proposed provisional government. It insisted that a government could be legitimate only if backed by elected representatives of the people. The members of the constituent assembly (Landtag) were called back into session and met for just the second time on 17 March. They chose Johannes Hoffmann of the SPD as minister-president. He then formed a minority cabinet consisting of four members from the SPD, two from the USPD, two independents and one from the Peasants' League. The DDP and BVP accepted it as a government they could tolerate.

Also on 17 March, the Landtag unanimously passed a provisional state constitution based on a previous document developed under Eisner. It guaranteed the sovereignty of the people, the independence of the courts and basic civic rights such as freedom of speech and religion. The following day the Landtag granted the government extensive powers to rule by decree. After allowing representatives of the Central Council to sit in at its meetings, the new government focused its efforts on the critical issues of food, housing and energy.

Hoffmann made compromises with those calling for socialization of the Bavarian economy, but was adamantly against demands for a council republic. On 3 April, he called for a new meeting of the Landtag. April third was also the day on which a soviet republic was declared in Hungary; communists in Munich took the coincidental event as a signal for action. Since Bavaria had no reliable military forces to protect the Hoffmann government and Landtag, the cabinet bowed to the pressure and postponed the Landtag meeting. On 4 April, workers in Augsburg declared a general strike. Two days later, an SPD party congress in Munich called for a Soviet republic (Räterepublik). Munich's USPD followed suit, and on the night of 6–7 April, the Bavarian Soviet Republic was proclaimed by the Central Council in the absence of its SPD members. Ernst Niekisch declared the Landtag dissolved.

=== Bavarian Soviet Republic ===
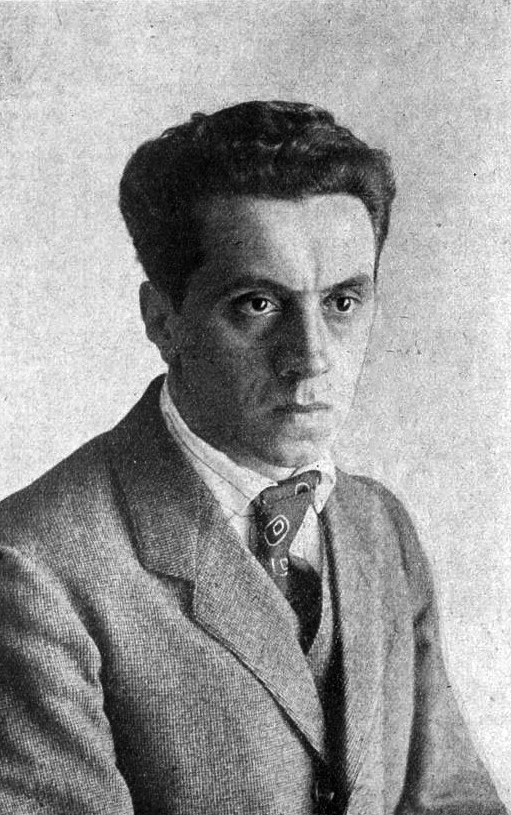
Ernst Toller, the first head of the Bavarian Soviet Republic

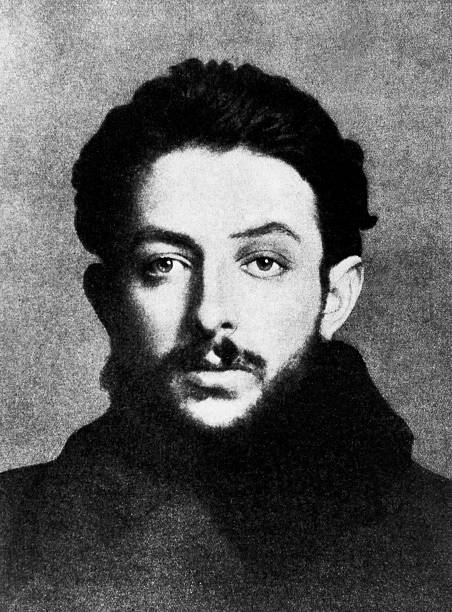
Eugen Leviné. The second leader of the Bavarian Soviet Republic was tried and executed in 1919 for his role in the insurrection.

Most of the members of the new republic's cabinet came from the USPD, which was the only party fully behind the coup. The SPD's Niekisch, saying that the revolution was premature, stepped down as head of the Central Council and was replaced by Ernst Toller (USPD), a 25-year-old playwright. The SPD's leaders continued to back a parliamentary system, and the KPD dismissed the regime as a "soviet republic in appearance only" (Scheinräterepublik). Toller's government was overall representative of bourgeois revolutionary idealism, with its radicalism more intellectual than proletarian. It was able to accomplish very little in its short life, and its own actions quickly made it an object of general scorn. The Foreign Affairs minister, for example, declared war on Württemberg and Switzerland after they refused to lend Bavaria the sixty locomotives it had requested. Across the rest of Bavaria, only the larger cities with significant workers' movements backed the change in government. In most rural areas, the events in Munich had little or no effect.

Hoffmann and his government in the meantime had fled to Bamberg in northern Bavaria where they asked the Berlin government for military help to supplement the Freikorps unit of Franz von Epp. They imposed a partial transportation and economic embargo on southern Bavaria, including Munich, and made efforts to bring other cities back to their side. Augsburg's council gave them a promise of neutrality in return for assurances that no action would be taken against it. The self-declared Würzburg Soviet Republic, which had little local support, was suppressed by units of the Bavarian Army on 9 April, and by the tenth, most of northern Bavaria was under the control of the Hoffmann government. Its attempt to retake Munich using a local republican protection force (Schutztruppe) failed in the Palm Sunday Putsch of 13 April. It left 21 dead and about 80 wounded.

At a meeting of councils that evening, Eugen Leviné of the KPD pushed through a resolution to form a new government headed by an executive committee under Leviné, Max Levien and the KPD. Without instructions from communist leaders in either Berlin or Moscow, it set about establishing a "true" Soviet-style system. It called for a ten-day general strike on the 14th and formed a Red Army under Rudolf Egelhofer. The strike and the military blockade that had all but cut Munich off from the outside world quickly led to severe food shortages in the city. On 27 April, Ernst Toller pushed for negotiations with Hoffmann and convinced an assembly of Munich workers' and soldiers' councils to issue a vote of no confidence against Leviné and his government. They resigned, and Toller took Leviné's place. His attempt to reach an understanding with Hoffmann failed since Gustav Noske, the national minister of defense, insisted on complete surrender.

On 30 April 1919, when government and Freikorps troops already had Munich encircled, members of the Red Army killed ten hostages (seven members of the Thule Society, two soldiers and a Jewish art professor). Reacting to exaggerated reports of a massacre, Freikorps units ignored orders for a coordinated entry into Munich and unleashed a "white terror" on the city. By the time the Red Army was defeated on 3 May, 606 dead were counted, 335 of them civilians. In the trials that followed, the crimes of the "red terror" were pursued more forcefully than those of the Freikorps. Leviné was given the death sentence and executed on 5 June; Toller received five years in prison. Egelhofer had been killed without trial by the Freikorps; of the main leaders, only Max Levien had managed to escape.

For many Bavarians, the period of the Bavarian Soviet Republic was a powerful motivation to be on guard against the threat of Russian Bolshevism and to support even drastic measures to ensure peace and order. The violence of its suppression cost the SPD considerable support among workers and left the Hoffmann government more dependent on the national government.

=== Second Hoffmann government and the Bavarian constitution ===
Hoffmann's SPD-USPD-BB minority government was no longer viable after the bloody events of early May. Hoffmann called on the leaders of the BVP and DDP to form a coalition with the SPD. They drew up an agreement, the Bamberger Abkommen, which pledged to revoke the government's right to rule by decree; nationalise mines, hydroelectric works and pharmacies; put strong state controls on businesses responsible for food, clothing and shelter; and make the provisional constitution formal. On 31 May 1919, Hoffmann was re-elected minister-president and introduced his cabinet made up of five members of the SPD and two each from the DDP and BVP.

On 28 May, the Landtag constitutional committee, with one representative each from the three coalition parties, used the 17 March draft constitution along with the government's recommended changes to draw up a constitution for a parliamentary democracy with a strong one-chamber Landtag and a relatively weak minister-president. It included a short list of basic rights and ended church oversight of schools. The final draft was approved on 12 August, one day after the ratification of the Weimar Constitution. The cabinet returned to Munich five days later. The Constitution of Bavaria (often referred to as the Bamberg Constitution because of where it was approved) went into effect on 15 September.

The conservative wing of the BVP wanted a loose federation at the national level that would preserve the special rights that Bavaria had had under the German Empire, but the Hoffmann cabinet, without consulting the Landtag, gave up its rights. Bavaria became a co-equal state within the federal Weimar Republic. Tensions within Bavaria over the issue of federalism remained strong.

The Treaty of Versailles, which was signed on 28 June 1919, had a significant effect on Bavaria. It lost a small part (the Saarpfalz-Kreis) of the Palatinate and gained the Free State of Coburg through a local referendum that was overwhelmingly in Bavaria's favor. A more significant impact came as a result of the treaty's requirement that paramilitary organizations disarm. Bavaria had numerous armed patriotic associations and citizens' defense leagues (Einwohnerwehren) which were conservative, often still monarchist and led by influential men such as Gustav von Kahr, the district president of Upper Bavaria. Even some SPD ministers tolerated the groups as a way to help preserve order.

The difficult issue of how to handle Bavaria's paramilitary groups came to a head during the Kapp Putsch in Berlin (13–18 March 1920). In Bavaria, workers' and soldiers' defense groups formed to oppose the citizens' defense leagues and the pro-putsch elements of the Reichswehr. During the night of 13–14 March, the cabinet – including all of its SPD members – voted under the pressure of General Arnold von Möhl, the head of Bavarian Reichswehr, to give him executive power for the Munich region. Hoffmann and his cabinet resigned, and on 16 March the Landtag chose Kahr of the BVP as minister-president. The SPD refused to participate in his cabinet. It was then that the idea of Bavaria as a "cell of order" (Ordnungszelle) – in Kahr's mind a bastion against a country that was completely "Jew-ridden" and sinking into "Marxist chaos" – began to take shape. Bavaria became a refuge for the extreme right, including prominent leaders such as Erich Ludendorff and Hermann Ehrhardt of the ultra-nationalist and antisemitic terrorist group Organisation Consul, and it provided fertile ground for the growth of Adolf Hitler's National Socialist German Workers' Party (NSDAP).

== Bavarian "cell of order" ==
=== Kahr government ===
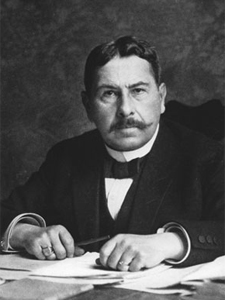
Gustav Ritter von Kahr, Minister-President of Bavaria 1920–1921 and General State Commissioner 1923–1924

Kahr's primary strength came from groups such as the Citizens' Defense that were outside the parliamentary system. He formed a cabinet with members from the BVP, DDP and BB. The SPD, the second-largest contingent in the Landtag, was notably absent. In the 6 June 1920 Landtag election, the BVP remained the largest party with 65 seats, but the SPD's second place finish was with only 25 seats, down from 61 the year before. The biggest gainer was the USPD, which rose from three seats to 20.

The Kahr government abolished the workers' and soldiers' councils in October and, following a suggestion from Crown Prince Rupprecht, ordered the mass expulsion of so-called Eastern Jews, many of whom had lived in Bavaria for generations. Kahr did nothing against the Citizens' Defense Leagues and other right-wing paramilitary organizations that the World War I Allies were pressing to have abolished. Only when the London Ultimatum of 5 May 1921 threatened an Allied occupation of the Ruhr if Germany did not comply with the Treaty of Versailles' demands for disarmament, did Kahr order the Citizens' Defense Leagues to turn in their weapons. They were officially disbanded by a Reich order two weeks later. Many of the former members joined other right-wing nationalist groups such as the Bund Bayern und Reich and – the organization that grew the fastest after the banning of the Citizens' Defense Leagues – the Nazi Sturmabteilung (SA).

Kahr's support collapsed after members of the Organisation Consul assassinated Matthias Erzberger, Germany's former finance minister and one of the signatories of the Armistice of 11 November 1918, in August 1921. The Berlin government issued an emergency order banning anti-republican publications and associations, but Kahr refused to enforce it against a number of publications in Bavaria, including the Nazi Party's Völkischer Beobachter. The crisis between the central government and Bavaria peaked when the Reichstag tried to end the state of emergency that had been in effect in Bavaria since September 1919. Kahr resisted, and the BVP withdrew its support on 11 September 1921. Kahr and his cabinet then resigned.

=== Lerchenfeld government ===
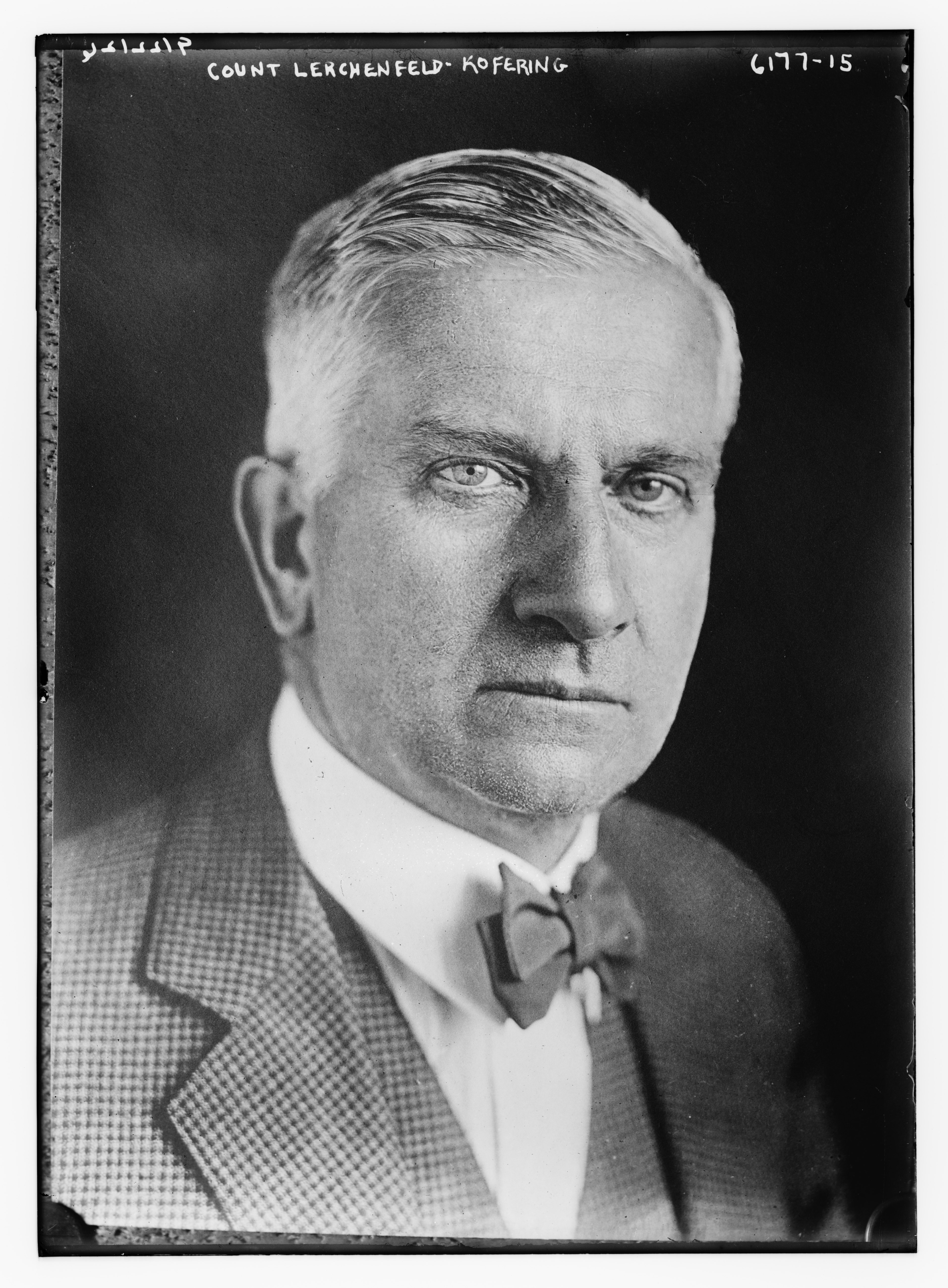
Hugo Graf von Lerchenfeld-Köfering

Hugo Graf von Lerchenfeld-Köfering of the BVP was chosen as Kahr's successor. As a conservative but also a republican, Lerchenfeld took a stand against radicalism from both the Left and the Right. He was able to reach a compromise that reduced tensions with the federal government, and the state of emergency in Bavaria was lifted effective 31 October 1921. Problems with Berlin arose again following the assassination of Foreign Minister Walther Rathenau in June 1922, again by the Organisation Consul. The majority of the ministers in Lerchenfeld's cabinet saw the Law for the Protection of the Republic that was passed by the Reichstag in response to Rathenau's assassination as an infringement on the judicial sovereignty of the states. The cabinet voted over Lerchenfeld's objections to reject the law. The DDP then left the governing coalition and was replaced by the Bavarian Middle Party (essentially the Bavarian branch of the right-wing German National People's Party(DNVP)). Bavaria and the federal government were able to reach a satisfactory compromise on the disputed law, but the criticism of Lerchenfeld's conciliatory approach continued. He resigned on 2 November 1922 and was replaced by Eugen von Knilling of the BVP.

=== Knilling government and the Beer Hall Putsch ===
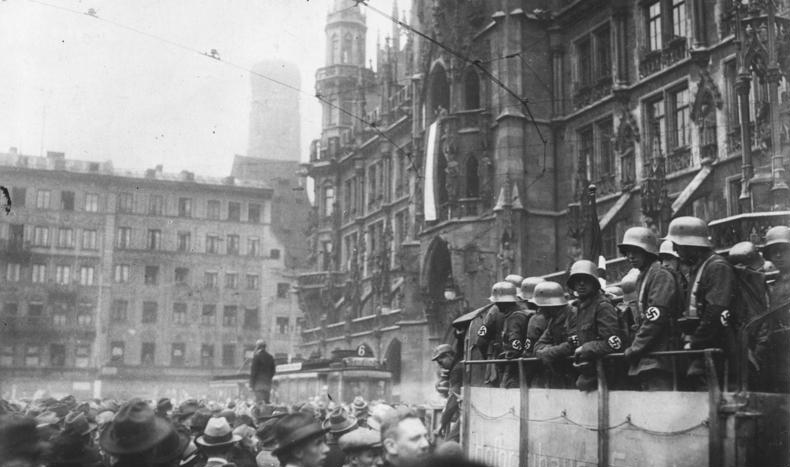
Munich's Marienplatz during the Beer Hall Putsch

Knilling was in office during the Weimar Republic's crisis year of 1923. In January, French and Belgian troops occupied the industrial Ruhr district after Germany was declared to be in default on its reparations payments. Two days later the German government responded with a call for passive resistance, which spurred the German currency into a period of hyperinflation. The Treaty of Versailles had placed Bavaria's Saarpfalz region under a League of Nations mandate, and its coal mines were given to France. In addition, Bavaria was responsible for 11% of the required deliveries of meat and live animals to the Allies. The loss of draft horses was felt acutely by Bavarian farmers.

In addition to its economic problems, Bavaria remained under pressure to control the numerous patriotic associations that were active in the Free State. On 26 January, the government banned a planned Nazi Party conference and declared a brief state of emergency in Munich. Gustav von Kahr, again district president of Upper Bavaria, and Major General Otto von Lossow, the Reichswehr district commander of Bavaria, were able to convince the cabinet to rescind the ban. When Germany's chancellor, Gustav Stresemann, called off the passive resistance to the Ruhr occupation on 26 September 1923, the Knilling cabinet saw it as a threat to German unity from radical left-wing forces that the patriotic associations would be vital in resisting. It immediately called a state of emergency and gave full executive power to Gustav von Kahr as general state commissioner (Generalstaatskommissar).

At the same time, the government in Berlin announced a nationwide state of emergency and transferred executive power to the Minister of Defense Otto Gessler. The SPD members of Stresemann's cabinet saw Bavaria's action as a signal to "ethnic corrupters of the people" in other parts of Germany to follow their lead, but they were unable to find a majority to force Bavaria to rescind its state of emergency. The other parties in the coalition were convinced that Munich would not obey. On 1 October, General Lossow, in a clear case of disobeying a direct order from Gessler, refused to shut down the Nazi Völkischer Beobachter without Kahr's approval. Gessler ruled out military action (a Reichsexekution) because the Reichswehr leadership was not willing to move against Bavaria and the Reichswehr troops stationed there. That left the federal government without any means to force Bavarian obedience.

The already critical situation in Bavaria intensified with the coup-like plans that both Kahr and Hitler were forming. Kahr lost the competition with Hitler to lead Bavaria's patriotic associations when, at the beginning of September, Hitler founded the Kampfbund as an umbrella organization for them. After Gessler dismissed Lossow in October, Kahr made him commander of the Reichswehr division in Bavaria, and it took a pledge to discharge its duty to Bavaria rather than the government in Berlin. Kahr and Lossow, together with the head of the Bavarian Police, Hans Ritter von Seisser, then began to move forward with plans that envisioned a march on Berlin that would set up a national dictatorship with Kahr, at least initially, at its head. Hitler and the Kampfbund were to be merely their foot soldiers.

Kahr's preparations made Hitler realise that he was in danger of losing the initiative. He moved his own plans for a march on Berlin forward and sought to win over Kahr, Lossow and Seisser. Using the opportunity created by a mass meeting that Kahr had called in Munich's Bürgerbräukeller on the evening of 8 November 1923, Hitler burst in during a speech by Kahr and forced him along with Lossow and Seisser into an adjoining room. There, they were coerced into saying that they would join forces with Hitler. Kahr was to be the Statthalter (similar to a governor) of Bavaria, Lossow the Reichswehr minister and Seisser the Reich minister of police. Erich Ludendorff, who was working closely with Hitler, then let the three men go, trusting in what he interpreted as their words of honor. Knilling and two of the other ministers who were at the Bürgerbräukeller that evening were taken into custody. Once free, Kahr, Lossow and Seisser quickly renounced their agreements with Hitler and joined the Bavarian officials who had already been working against him. On the morning of the ninth, the Nazi's march through Munich was stopped by the Bavarian State Police with the loss of 20 lives. Ludendorff was arrested on the spot; Hitler fled Munich but was found and taken into custody eleven days later. Both the federal and Bavarian governments banned the Nazi Party.

At his trial in February and March 1924, Hitler was sentenced to five years in prison, the minimum for high treason, but was released after eight months when the rest of his sentence was suspended. Kahr remained state commissioner with his powers limited until February 1924.

At the same time as the Hitler putsch, a separatist group under the leadership of Franz-Josef Heinz, with the open support of French troops that had occupied the region under the terms of the Treaty of Versailles, set up the "Palatine Republic" in Bavaria's Rhenish exclave. The separatists had little support from the public, and their regime collapsed when the Bavarian Palatinate Commissariat instigated Heinz's assassination on 9 January 1924.

An election for a new Bavarian Landtag took place on 6 April 1924. The BVP and SPD remained in first and second place, although the BVP dropped from 65 to 46 seats, and the SPD, in spite of having reunited with the rival USPD in 1922, lost two of its previous 25 seats. By far the biggest gainer was the newly formed Völkisch Bloc in Bavaria (VBI), also with 23 seats, which made it the largest völkisch contingent of any state in the Weimar Republic. The VBI was close to the Nazis but opposed their previous revolutionary approach. In its campaign, the VBI made it clear that its goal was to destroy the parliamentary system from within. Its primary tactic in the Landtag was to introduce a flood of proposals in order to bring its völkisch ideology to the attention of the people and the press. The party broke apart after the Nazi Party (NSDAP) was re-founded in February 1925.

== Golden Twenties ==
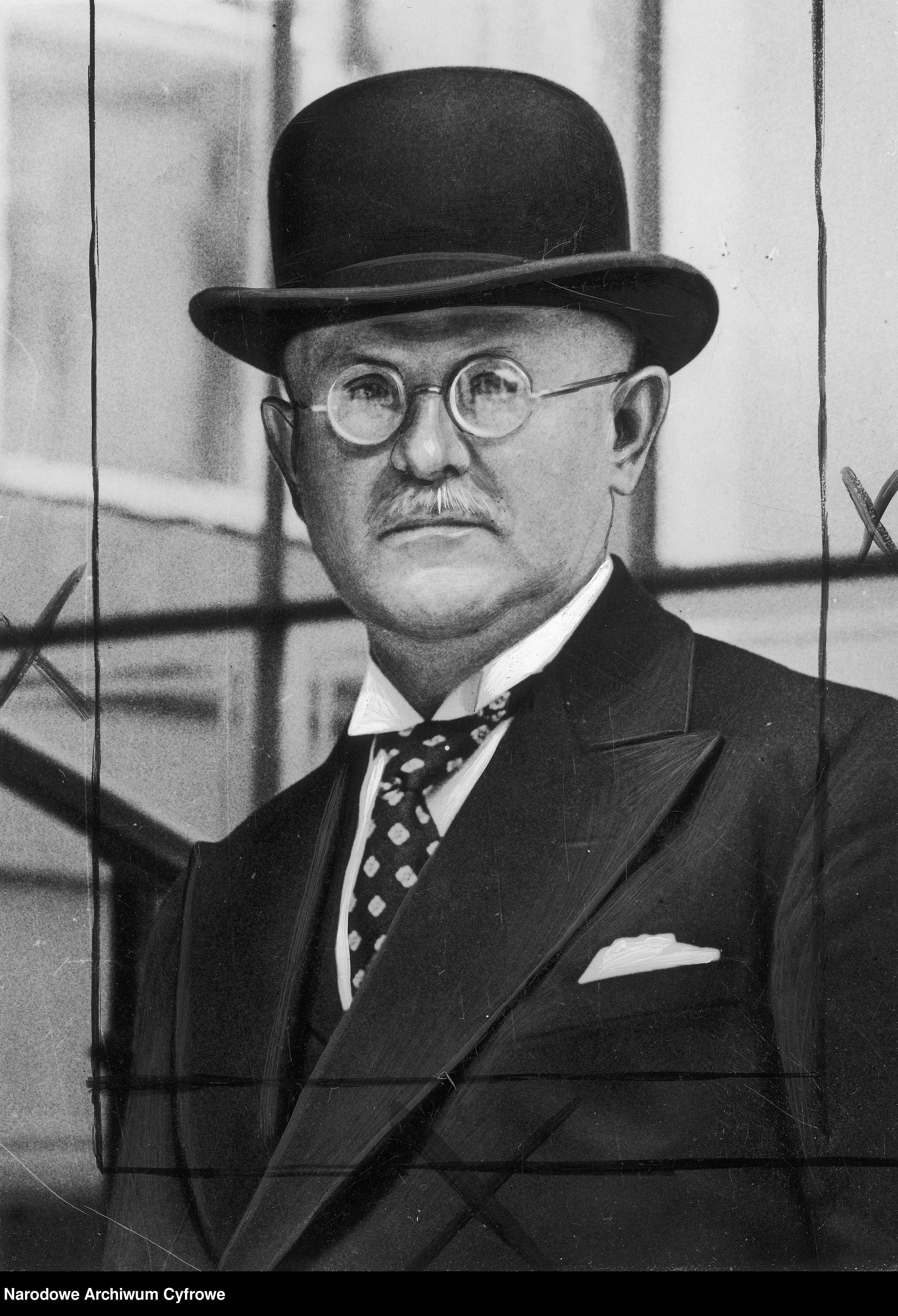
Heinrich Held, Bavaria's longest serving minister-president (1924–1933)

The situation in both Germany as a whole and in Bavaria calmed considerably in 1924. On 2 July Heinrich Held, the parliamentary leader of the BVP, was elected minister-president with the support of the BVP, DNVP, DVP and Peasants' League. He remained in office for almost nine years and was Bavaria's last minister-president during the Weimar Republic. With him at the head of the government, Bavaria's political leaders began to distance themselves from Hitler. They became among the most vociferous opponents of the Nazis as their conservative ideology diverged more and more sharply from that of National Socialism. Held's policies were, in general, conciliatory, with the goal of stabilising the political situation in Bavaria. In the final years of his term, he worked unsuccessfully to have the Weimar Constitution revised to make it more strongly federalist. He thought that in its existing form, it limited Bavaria's political independence too extensively.

Bavaria, which was 70% Catholic, concluded a new concordat with the Holy See in 1925. It committed Bavaria to support the Catholic Church financially, ended state appointment of church officials, granted the church co-determination rights in the appointment of professors, and guaranteed the continued existence of theological faculties, confessional teacher training, confessional schools and religious education. The Bavarian Concordat became a model for the agreements that the Holy See made with other German states.

Bavaria's economy grew during the second half of the 1920s, although – as in the rest of Germany – much of the growth was driven by an influx of foreign money attracted by Germany's relatively high interest rates. Mid-sized Bavarian businesses competed both nationally and internationally in fields ranging from the brewing of beer to the manufacture of radios, ceramics, optical products and toys. Willy Messerschmitt's aircraft manufacturing business was founded in the Bavarian city of Augsburg. Munich in 1930 was the seat of half of Germany's reinsurance market. Bavarian agriculture was in the process of modernizing technically when overproduction in the world market largely halted the progress beginning in 1927. The problem led to agricultural workers migrating to the cities for jobs in industry.

The improved political and economic situation was reflected in the results of the 1928 election to the Bavarian Landtag. The radical parties on both sides of the political spectrum lost ground to the moderate parties. The far-right Völkisch Bloc in Bavaria, which won 23 seats in 1924, had dissolved, and the Nazi Party, no longer banned, picked up only nine seats. The Communist Party dropped from nine seats to five. The top vote-getters were the BVP (46 seats) and the SPD (34).

== Great Depression and end of the Bavarian republic ==
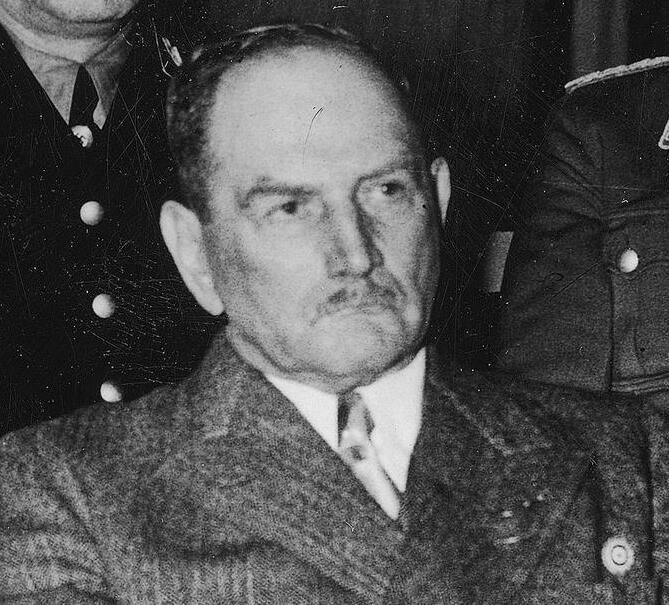
Franz von Epp, who became the Nazi Reich commissioner for Bavaria in 1933

Germany's fragile post-war economy had been sustained in large part by foreign loans under the Dawes Plan (1924) and the Young Plan (1929). After the New York stock market crash of October 1929, American banks began withdrawing their lines of credit to German companies. Unemployment grew dramatically as a result, rising to four million in 1930. Although Bavaria was hard hit, it suffered relatively less than Germany as a whole. Between 1925 and 1933, for example, employment in industry and handcrafts sank by 30.3% nationwide but only 21.2% in Bavaria. During the same period, the figures for trade and transportation were -1.25% for Germany and +6.2% in Bavaria. Agriculture in the Free State continued to struggle, with meat prices falling by half between 1929 and 1933 due to decreased consumer demand. From 1925 to 1933, employment in building and its ancillary trades fell by two-thirds and by half in machine and automobile manufacturing. Banks that were owed money by BMW took control of the company. As was the case in the rest of Germany, many of those who suffered under the effects of the Great Depression turned to extremist parties on both the Left and the Right, although in Bavaria political Catholicism was something of a stabilizing factor.

Bavaria's political situation also worsened under the effects of the Depression. In July 1930 the Bavarian Peasants' League left the Held government after it introduced a butcher's tax as a part of its attempts to reduce the shortfall in the state budget. Left without a majority in the Landtag, Held and his cabinet resigned but remained in place in a caretaker role. Under the Bavarian constitution, a government could leave office only if a majority could be found to form a new one, and that proved impossible with the existing party configuration. The Landtag too needed a majority vote to dissolve itself, and since that was equally out of reach, the Held cabinet stayed on until the next scheduled election in May 1932. But even it did not break the stalemate. The BVP won 45 seats and the Nazis 43, with the remaining 40 seats split among four other parties. Held's cabinet remained in place and was able to govern effectively since there was no possibility of it being voted out of office, and it could largely ignore party politics.

1932 Landtag election results
Party	Seats	Pct. of Votes
Bavarian People's Party (BVP)	45	32.6
Nazi Party (NSDAP)	43	32.5
Social Democratic Party (SPD)	20	15.5
Communist Party of Germany (KPD)	8	6.6
Bavarian Peasants' and Middle-Class Party	9	6.5
National Liberal Party, Bavarian Middle Party and German People's Party (DVP) in the Palatinate	3	3.3
Others	0	3.0

In March 1931 Bavaria helped pressure the government of German Chancellor Heinrich Brüning to institute a nationwide ban on the Nazi SA and SS, but when Franz von Papen became chancellor in June 1932, the prohibition was lifted. Bavaria then banned the two groups within the Free State, only to have the government in Berlin revoke the measure through an emergency decree. Bavaria was nevertheless able to keep a tight security rein on the SA and SS, in part because of strict rules against both left- and right-wing extremism in schools and universities. After the July 1932 Prussian coup d'état, when Papen ousted the elected government of Prussia and made himself its Reich commissioner, Bavaria joined Prussia and Baden in the ultimately ineffective court case against the coup. Bavarian officials feared that Papen might attempt to do the same thing with the Free State.

After Hitler came to power in January 1933, the Held cabinet did what it could to resist Berlin, such as when Hitler's minister of the Interior Wilhelm Frick proposed banning some newspapers in Bavaria. Held stressed the state's loyalty and its anti-communist position in an attempt to show that no intervention would be necessary. In spite of that, a few days after the 5 March 1933 Reichstag election in which 43% of the Bavarian vote went to the Nazis and only 27% to the BVP, Frick named Franz von Epp as Reichskommissar (Reich commissioner) for Bavaria. The SA occupied the ministries in Munich and rough-handled two of the ministers before Epp appointed Nazis to head all of the Bavarian ministries. On 16 March Epp announced Held's resignation; Held fled to Switzerland after resisting the Nazis longer than the head of any other German state.

The first "synchronisation" (Gleichschaltung) law of 31 March 1933 dissolved the Landtag and reconstituted it based on the results of the Reichstag election of 5 March and thus gave the Nazis the largest share of seats. Following the second synchronization law (7 April), Epp was named to the newly created post of Reichsstatthalter (Reich governor) and he, in turn, appointed Ludwig Siebert as Minister-President on 12 April. The two measures effectively ended the political independence of the Free State of Bavaria.

== Aftermath: Nazi era ==
During the Nazi regime (1933–1945), Bavaria's official status was further reduced by the growing importance of the administrative subdivisions called Gaue and their leaders, the Gauleiter. Bavaria was made up of six such Gaue, including one for the Rhenish Palatinate. The Nazi Party's annual rallies (1923–1938) were held at Nuremberg, and the first German concentration camp was built at Dachau, near Munich. Bavaria had approximately 41,000 Jewish residents in 1933; by 1939, the number had shrunk to 16,000. Few of them survived Nazi rule. During World War II, Munich, Nuremberg, Augsburg, Würzburg and other Bavarian cities suffered extensive damage from Allied bombings. Bavaria was occupied by the United States Armed Forces and was part of the American Zone of Allied-occupied Germany. In 1949, as the Free State of Bavaria, it became one of the constituent states of the Federal Republic of Germany.

== See also ==
- Bavarian Landtag elections in the Weimar Republic
