= Ludwig Siebert =

Nazi politician and Bavarian Minister-President (1874–1942)

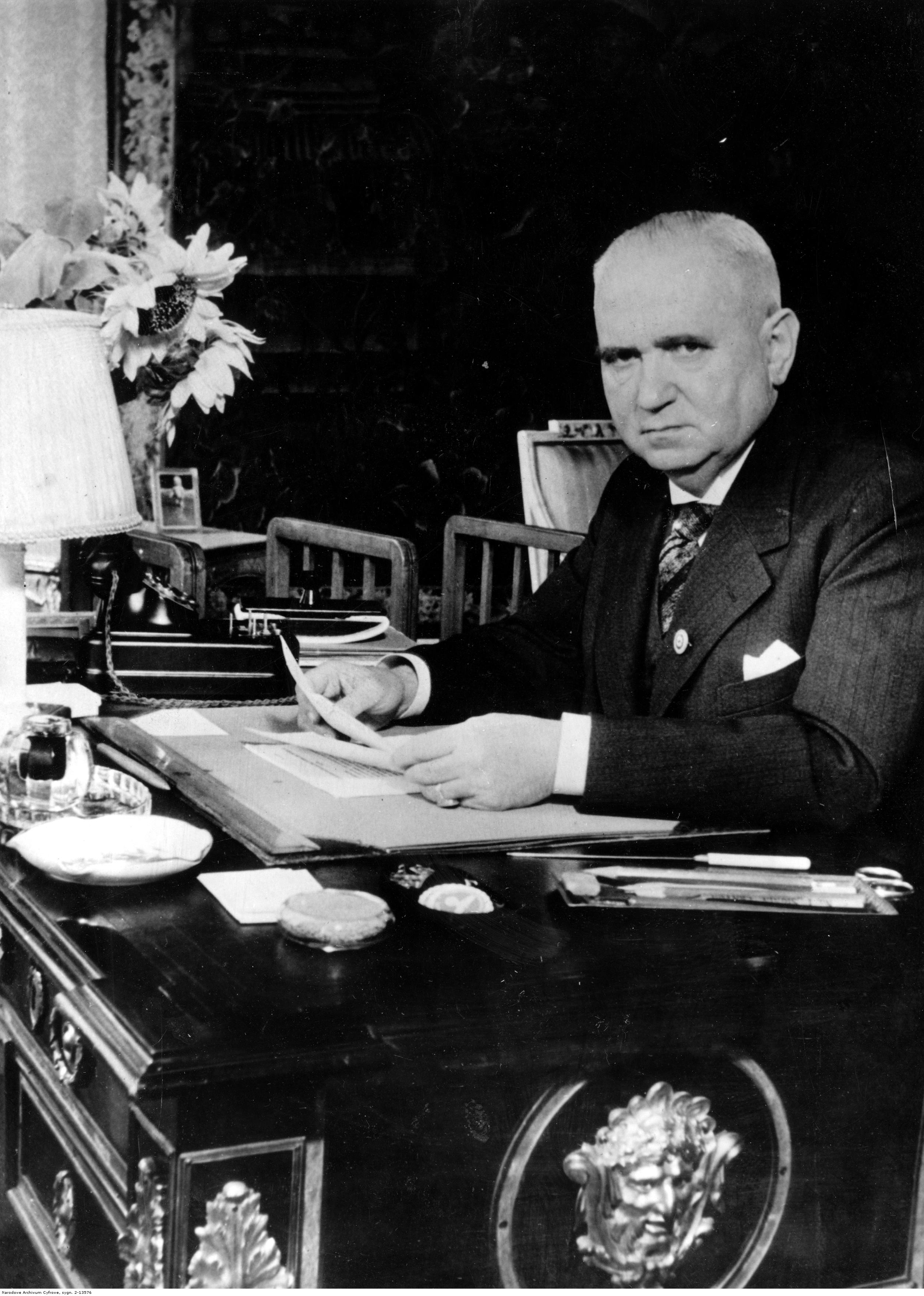

Minister-President of Bavaria
- In office 12 April 1933 – 1 November 1942
- Preceded by: Heinrich Held
- Succeeded by: Paul Giesler

Finance Minister
- In office 16 March 1933 – 1 November 1942
- Preceded by: Fritz Schäffer
- Succeeded by: Paul Giesler

Minister of Economics
- In office 28 November 1936 – 1 November 1942
- Preceded by: Hans Dauser
- Succeeded by: Paul Giesler

Minister of Economics
- In office 27 June 1933 – 28 February 1934
- Preceded by: Eugen Graf von Quadt zu Wykradt und Isny
- Succeeded by: Hermann Esser

Personal details
- Born: 17 October 1874 Ludwigshafen, Kingdom of Bavaria, German Empire
- Died: 1 November 1942 (aged 68) Prien am Chiemsee, Bavaria, Nazi Germany
- Party: Nazi Party
- Other political affiliations: Bavarian People's Party
- Education: Ludwig-Maximilians-Universität München
- Occupation: Lawyer

Ludwig Siebert (17 October 1874 – 1 November 1942) was a German lawyer and Nazi Party politician who served as the Minister President of Bavaria in Nazi Germany from 1933 to 1942.

== Early life ==
Siebert was born in Ludwigshafen in the Palatinate, the son of a locomotive engineer. He attended the gymnasium in Mannheim and studied law at the Ludwig-Maximilians-Universität München from 1893 to 1897. After passing his legal examination in 1900, he worked in the civil service as a lawyer in Frankenthal (Pfalz) and became the public prosecutor in Bad Dürkheim and Neustadt an der Haardt (today, Neustadt an der Weinstraße). From 1905 to 1906, he worked as the public prosecutor of Fürth in Middle Franconia. In 1907, he became a magistrate in Lindau on Lake Constance. A member of the Bavarian People's Party (BVP), he joined the City Council of the city of Rothenburg ob der Tauber and was the Bürgermeister (Mayor) there from 1908 to 1919. Siebert was elected Bürgermeister of Lindau in 1919 and Oberbürgermeister (Lord Mayor) in 1924.

== Nazi Party career ==
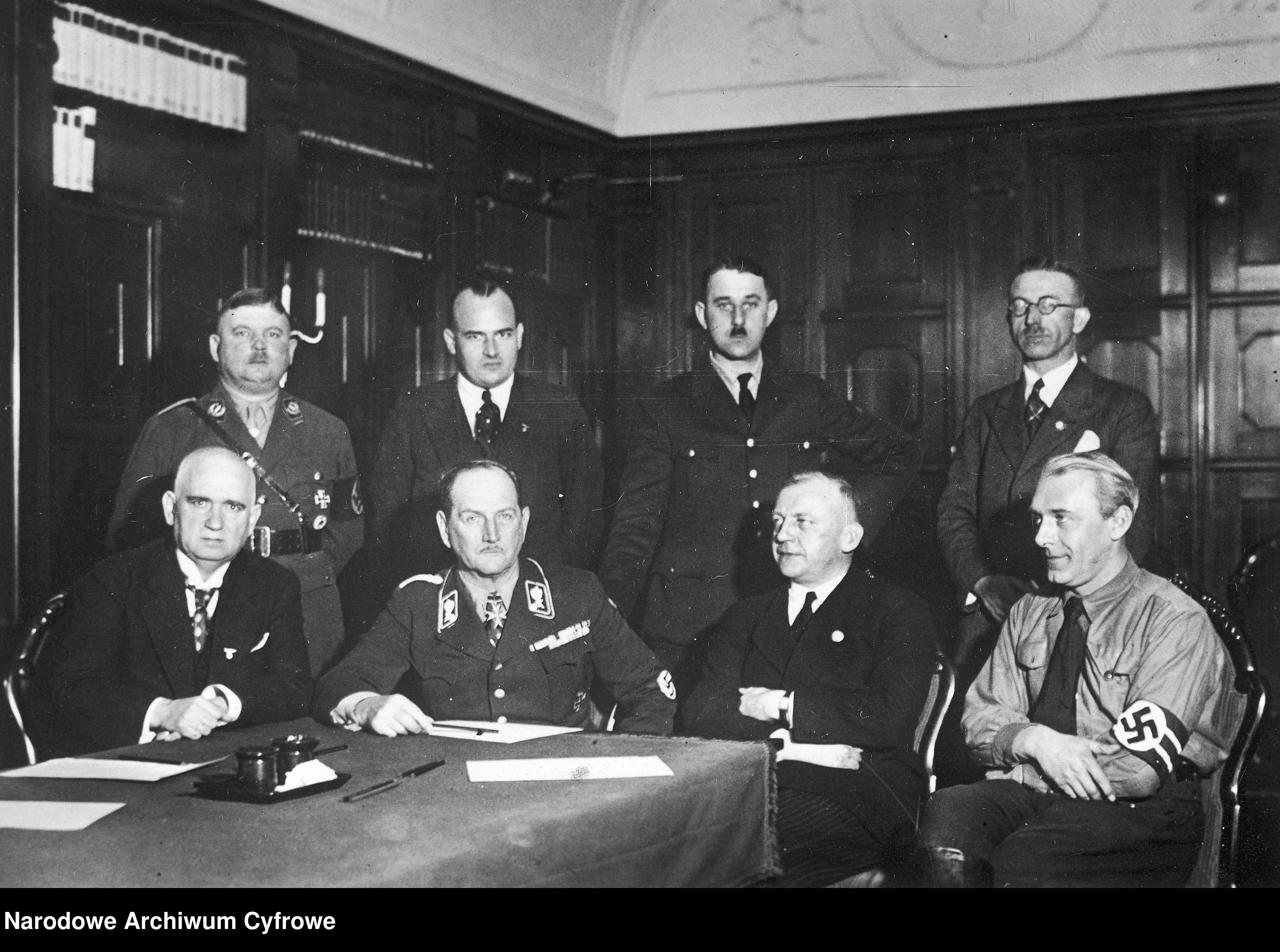
The Nazi controlled Bavarian Commissarial Government of March 1933 (German: Bayerische Kommission, Reichskommissariat für Bayern, Kabinett von Epp). Seated from left Minister of Finance Ludwig Siebert, Prime Minister/Reich Governor of Bavaria Franz von Epp, Minister of the Interior Adolf Wagner, and Minister of Culture Hans Schemm. Standing from left State Commissioner Ernst Röhm, Minister of Justice Hans Frank, Minister of State Hermann Esser, and Minister of Agriculture Georg Luber. Press Photo: National Digital Archives of Poland

In the Reichstag election on 14 September 1930, Lindau was the only large town in southern Bavaria in which the Nazis became the largest party, with 22.1% of the vote. In January 1931, Siebert left the BVP and joined the Nazi Party (membership number 356,673), becoming the first Nazi Lord Mayor in Bavaria. The Nazis, conscious of the prestige this brought them, exploited Siebert's propaganda value by employing him as a public speaker on their behalf at numerous public meetings throughout Bavaria. On 27 January 1931, he addressed a crowd of 1,750 in Lindau, which was the largest political meeting ever recorded in the town at that time.

On 24 April 1932, Siebert was elected as a Nazi Party member of the Bavarian Landtag, where he sat until its dissolution in October 1933. On 10 March 1933, during the Nazi takeover of the state administration, he was named a representative of Bavaria to the Reichsrat until it was abolished on 14 February 1934. Also on 10 March, he was named Staatskommissar (State Commissioner) for the Bavarian Ministry of Finance in the administration of Franz Ritter von Epp, the Reichskommissar appointed by the central government. On 16 March, Siebert was formally named Finance Minister in the provisional Council of Ministers, formed by Epp after the forced resignation of Minister President Heinrich Held of the BVP. On 12 April 1933, after Epp was installed as the Reichsstatthalter (Reich Governor) for Bavaria, Siebert was appointed to succeed him as Minister-President. He retained the office of Finance Minister and, on 28 June 1933, he also assumed the portfolio of Minister of Economic Affairs until March 1934 when he was succeeded in this post by Hermann Esser.

In May 1933, Siebert officiated at the grand opening in Passau of the Ostmarkmuseum (today, the Oberhausmuseum in the Veste Oberhaus fortress). He was a member of Hans Frank's Academy for German Law from its inaugural meeting on 2 October 1933. On 12 November 1933, he was elected as a member of the Reichstag from electoral constituency 24 (Upper Bavaria-Swabia) and retained this seat until his death.

In March 1935, Siebert became head of the Bayerische Staatskanzlei and, from 28 November 1936, he again acted as Economics Minister. He initiated the so-called "Siebert Program" to fight unemployment in Bavaria. The program turned out to be insufficient to create new employment due to a lack of funds within the Bavarian government and support from the German central government. Siebert also had personal orders from Reich Chancellor Adolf Hitler to oversee the restoration of all castles in Germany and was especially involved in the restoration of the historical town of Rothenburg ob der Tauber between 1937 and 1941.

As Minister-President, Siebert did not have the power and authority his predecessors had under the Weimar Republic, as he had to share power with Epp. Also, he often found himself at odds with Adolf Wagner, the Gauleiter in Munich and the Bavarian Interior Minister. Wagner considered himself the "strongman" of the government and was resentful that he was not given the leading role as Minister-President. As one of the Alter Kämpfer (Old Fighters), he was often able to secure Hitler's support in his disputes with Siebert. Siebert, along with Epp, was disadvantaged by his lack of a powerful position in the Party hierarchy. As such, he had difficulty asserting his authority over other Party officials in Bavaria, in particular, powerful Gauleiter Julius Streicher and Josef Bürckel who ran their Gaue with a high degree of autonomy and were contemptuous of the government authorities. Furthermore, Siebert was hampered by his lack of command authority over the Party's paramilitary units in Bavaria, the SA and the SS, which were tightly controlled by Ernst Röhm (and his successors) and Heinrich Himmler, respectively.

From 1933 until his death, Siebert was chairman of the Supervisory Board (Aufsichtsrat) of the Bayerische Berg-, Hütten- und Salzwerke AG (Bavarian Mining, Metallurgical and Salt Works). After the Anschluss of 1938, Siebert also served as a member of the Supervisory Board of Alpine Montanbetrieb AG Hermann Göring in Linz, part of the massive Reichswerke Hermann Göring. He was also chairman of the Supervisory Board of Bayerischer Lloyd Schiffahrts (Lloyd Bavarian Shipping) in Regensburg. In March 1939, Siebert was made president of the Deutsche Akademie, a German cultural institute and the precursor of the Goethe-Institut. Siebert's tenure saw an increasing politicization of the organization when it was officially placed under the auspices of the Reich Ministry of Public Enlightenment and Propaganda and its operations abroad were overseen by Reichsminister Joseph Goebbels.

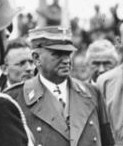
Siebert in SA uniform, 1938

After the outbreak of the Second World War in September 1939, Siebert was made a member of the Reich Defense Committees for Wehrkreise (Military Districts) VII and XIII, which encompassed Bavaria. A member of the SA, Siebert was promoted to SA-Gruppenführer on 9 November 1933 and SA-Obergruppenführer on 9 November 1938. On 12 April 1938, on the fifth anniversary of his assuming the leadership of the government of Bavaria, Siebert was awarded the Golden Party Badge. He died of a heart attack on 1 November 1942 and was given a lavish state funeral in Munich.

== Honorary citizenships ==
- Honorary citizen of Rothenburg ob der Tauber, alongside Hitler and Streicher (revoked after the war).
- Honorary citizen of Speyer and Augsburg, both also revoked after the war.

== Prominent relatives ==
Siebert's younger brother, Friedrich Siebert (1888–1950), was a professional soldier who rose to the rank of General der Infanterie in the Wehrmacht and served as a division and corps commander during the Second World War. Siebert's son, Friedrich "Fritz" Siebert (1903–1966), was also a lawyer and Nazi politician who, like his father, served as Bürgermeister of Lindau (1933–1939). He was an SS-Oberführer and served as an administrative official in the General Government. After the end of the war, in 1948, he was sentenced to 12 years imprisonment in Poland but was released in 1956.

== See also ==
- List of minister-presidents of Bavaria

== Bibliography ==
- Broszat, Martin (1981). The Hitler State: The Foundation and Development of the Internal Structure of the Third Reich. New York: Longman. ISBN 978-0-582-48997-4.
- Klee, Ernst (2007). Das Personenlexikon zum Dritten Reich. Wer war was vor und nach 1945. Frankfurt-am-Main: Fischer-Taschenbuch-Verlag. ISBN 978-3-596-16048-8.
- Lilla, Joachim; Döring, Martin; Schulz, Andreas, eds. (2004). Statisten in Uniform: die Mitglieder des Reichstags 1933–1945. Ein biographisches Handbuch. Unter Einbeziehung der völkischen und nationalsozialistischen Reichstagsabgeordneten ab Mai 1924. Düsseldorf: Droste. ISBN 978-3-770-05254-7.
- Miller, Michael D.; Schulz, Andreas (2012). Gauleiter: The Regional Leaders of the Nazi Party and Their Deputies, 1925–1945. Vol. 1 (Herbert Albrecht - H. Wilhelm Hüttmann). R. James Bender Publishing. ISBN 978-1-932-97021-0.
- Pridham, Geoffrey (1973). Hitler's Rise to Power: The Nazi Movement in Bavaria, 1923-1933. New York: Harper & Row. ISBN 978-0-061-36116-6.

Political offices
Preceded by Heinrich Held	Minister-President of Bavaria; 1933 – 1942	Succeeded by Paul Giesler
