= Fritz Schäffer =

German politician (1888–1967)

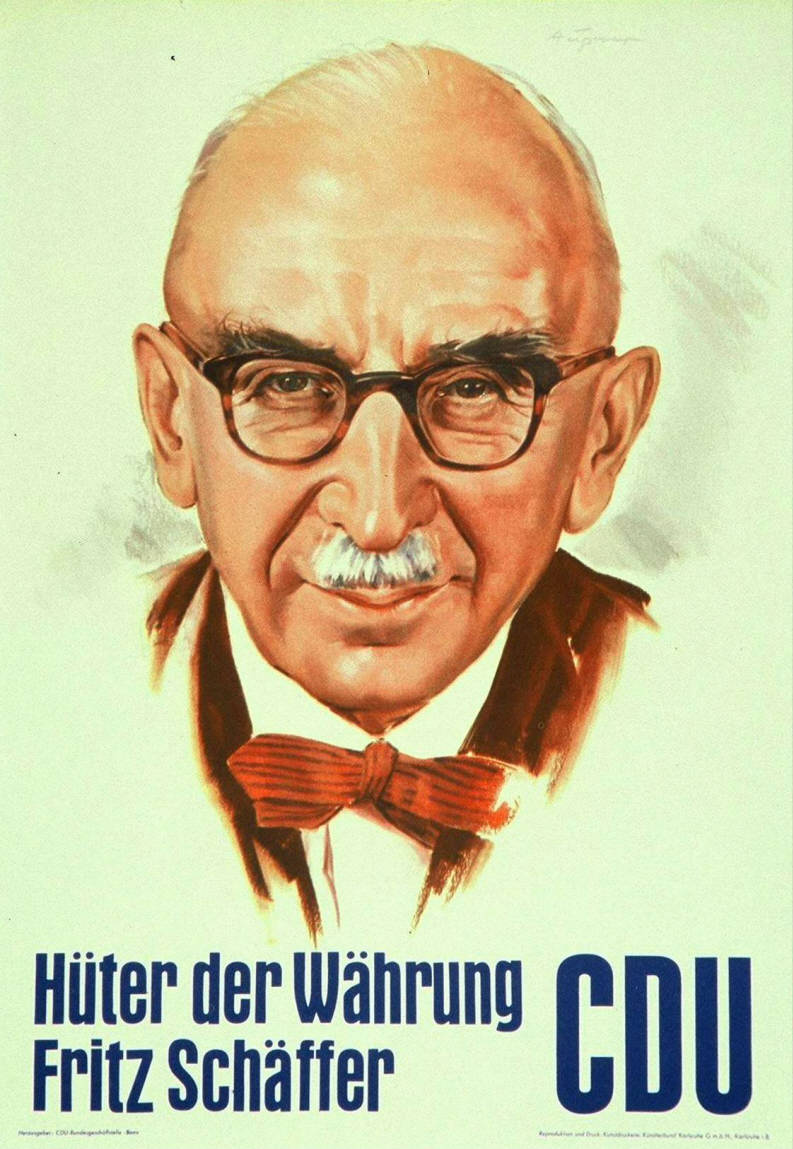
- Schäffer on a CDU election poster

Minister of Justice
- In office 29 October 1957 – 14 November 1961
- Chancellor: Konrad Adenauer
- Preceded by: Hans-Joachim von Merkatz
- Succeeded by: Wolfgang Stammberger

Minister of Finance
- In office 20 September 1949 – 29 October 1957
- Chancellor: Konrad Adenauer
- Preceded by: Office established
- Succeeded by: Franz Etzel

Member of the Bundestag; for Passau
- In office 7 September 1949 – 17 October 1961
- Preceded by: Constituency established
- Succeeded by: August Ramminger

Minister-President of Bavaria
- In office 28 May 1945 – 28 September 1945
- Preceded by: Paul Giesler
- Succeeded by: Wilhelm Hoegner

Minister for Finance of Bavaria
- In office 28 May 1945 – 28 September 1945
- Minister-President: Himself
- Preceded by: Paul Giesler
- Succeeded by: Fritz Terhalle
- In office 12 September 1931 – 10 March 1933
- Minister-President: Heinrich Held
- Preceded by: Karl von Deybeck
- Succeeded by: Ludwig Siebert

Member of the Landtag of Bavaria
- In office 1920–1933

Personal details
- Born: 12 May 1888 Munich, Germany
- Died: 29 March 1967 (aged 78) Berchtesgaden, West Germany
- Party: Christian Social Union (from 1945)
- Other political affiliations: Bavarian People's Party (1918–1933)

Military service
- Allegiance: German Empire
- Branch/service: German Army
- Years of service: 1915–1916
- Battles/wars: World War I

Fritz Schäffer (12 May 1888 – 29 March 1967) was a German politician of the Bavarian People's Party (BVP) and the Christian Social Union (CSU). He was the Bavarian Minister of Finance from 1931 to 1933, when the Nazis came to power in Berlin. In 1945 he became the first Minister President of Bavaria to hold office after the end of the Second World War. From 1949 to 1957, he was the West German federal Minister of Finance and, from 1957 to 1961, federal Minister of Justice.

== Biography ==
Fritz Schäffer was born in 1888 as the son of Gottfried Schäffer and Amalia Mayr. He went to school in Ingolstadt, Munich and Neuburg an der Donau, afterwards studying law in Munich. He joined as a volunteer the Bavarian Infanterie-Leib-Regiment in 1915. After service in Serbia and Tyrol, he was wounded at Verdun in May 1916 and released from army service.

Schäffer started working for the Bavarian state government in 1917. He married Else Dyroff in September 1917.

== Political career ==
From 1918 to 1933, Schäffer was a member of the BVP. In 1929, he became chairman of this Bavarian regionalist party. From 1920 to 1933, he was a member of the Landtag of Bavaria. In his early political career, he made some anti-Semitic speeches, a fact that would haunt him in his later political life. Nevertheless, he opposed the Nazis' rise to power in Bavaria and took part in the formation of the Bayernwacht in 1931, an organisation aimed at protecting conservative politicians from the SA. He aimed at forming a coalition, which would include the Nazi Party and the Centre Party, arguing that such a step would neutralise the Nazi party to some extent. After this failed, he attempted to elevate the last Bavarian crown prince, Rupprecht, to the dictatorial position of Staatskommissar. The move ultimately failed due to the resistance of Bavarian prime minister, Heinrich Held, who feared that Schäffer would be made prime minister in his stead.

In 1933, Schäffer found himself imprisoned for his actions against the Nazis. He was imprisoned from 1933 until 1934, after which he worked as a lawyer. He was imprisoned again in Dachau concentration camp after the 20 July Plot until the end of World War II, from August to October 1944.

In 1945 he was among the founders of the CSU. He was engaged in continuous strife with the party leader, Josef Müller over party politics. Müller wished to make the party multi-confessional, while Schäffer tried to move it towards a revival of the Catholic-dominated BVP. He was made the first postwar prime minister of Bavaria by General George S. Patton in 1945, but was relieved of his post by General Dwight D. Eisenhower after a couple of months, when his anti-Semitic past became known. Eisenhower, unlike Patton, also disliked the fact that Schäffer hired ex-Nazis for his administration. He was barred from politics by the US authorities until 1948, accused of being a Nazi sympathizer. He managed to clear himself of this charge and reentered politics afterwards.

From 1949 to 1961, he was a member of the Bundestag. He became Minister of Finance of the new Federal Republic of Germany in 1949 and held this post until 1957. In 1957, after elections, Konrad Adenauer, chancellor of Germany, attempted to remove Schäffer from his cabinet as his tight fiscal policies were felt as a hindrance to Germany's economic growth. After political negotiations, Schäffer was awarded the justice ministry instead.

During his time as German Minister of Finance, he became the second-most powerful man in federal politics. He was known for his tight fiscal policies, aimed at keeping the German currency stable. In this role, he strongly resisted any reparation claims to victims of the Nazi reign. After German rearmament, Schäffer was engaged in many arguments about defense spending, often irritating his NATO partners by his refusals to allocate more money to it.

== See also ==
- List of German finance ministers
- The Last Days of Patton

Political offices
| Preceded by Paul Giesler | Prime Minister of Bavaria; 1945 | Succeeded by Wilhelm Hoegner |
