= Deutsche Akademie =

German cultural institute founded in 1925

The Academy for the Scholarly Research and Cultivation of Germanness (die Akademie zur Wissenschaftlichen Erforschung und Pflege des Deutschtums), or German Academy (die Deutsche Akademie, pronounced [diː ˌdɔʏtʃə ʔakadeˈmiː]), was a German cultural institute founded in 1925 at Munich, under the Weimar Republic. Its founders included the geopolitician Karl Haushofer, who coined the political use of the term Lebensraum and strongly influenced Nazi ideology. Between 1939 and 1942, it was headed by Ludwig Siebert, a Nazi politician and the prime minister of Bavaria, and it became "the most important organisation representing Nazi cultural policy" abroad.

The Academy was banned under American occupation in 1945, and in 1951, the West German government replaced it with the present-day Goethe-Institut.
