= Eugen von Knilling =

German politician (1865–1927)

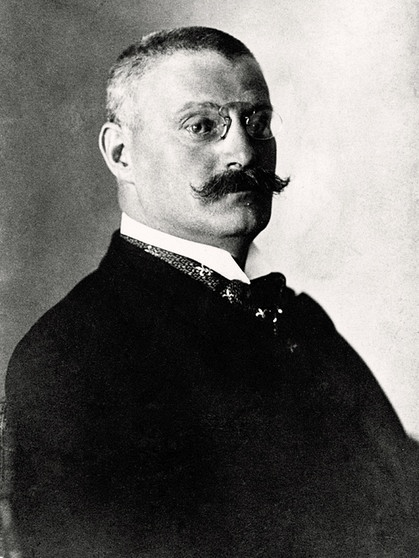
- Knilling in 1915

Minister-President of Bavaria
- In office 8 November 1922 – 30 June 1924
- Preceded by: Graf von Lerchenfeld-Köfering
- Succeeded by: Heinrich Held

Personal details
- Born: 1 August 1865 Munich, Kingdom of Bavaria, German Confederation
- Died: 20 October 1927 (aged 62) Munich, Bavaria, Weimar Republic

Eugen Ritter von Knilling (1 August 1865 – 20 October 1927) was a German politician who was the minister-president of Bavaria from 1922 to 1924.

== Biography ==
Knilling was born in 1865 in Munich. He studied law at the Ludwig-Maximilians-Universität München. From 1912 to 1918, he served as the minister for education in the government of the Kingdom of Bavaria. From 1920 to 1922, he was a member of the Bavarian parliament for the BVP. He became minister-president of Bavaria in 1922.

In September 1923, following a period of turmoil, Knilling declared martial law, appointing Gustav von Kahr as State Commissar with almost dictatorial powers. He was taken prisoner by Rudolf Hess during the Beer Hall Putsch of 1923. In 1924, he resigned, exasperated with politics, and returned to a civil service post.

Knilling died in Munich in 1927 at the age of 62.

== Bibliography ==
- Universitätsbibliothek Regensburg: Bosls bayerische Biographie author: Karl Bosl - Regensburg, publisher: Pustet

Political offices
Preceded by Graf von Lerchenfeld-Köfering	Prime Minister of Bavaria; 1922 – 1924	Succeeded by Heinrich Held
