= Karl Friedrich Speck =

German politician

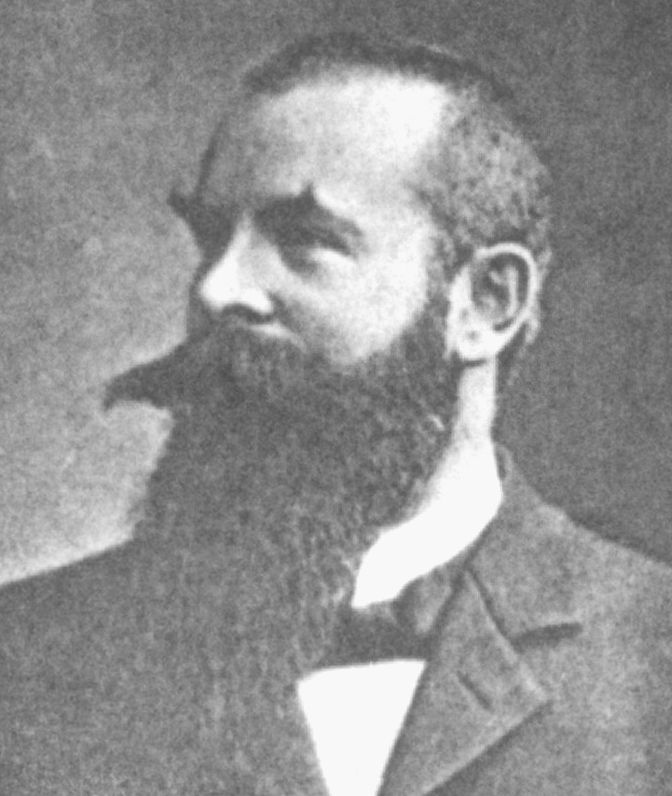
Karl Friedrich Speck

Karl Friedrich Speck (February 9, 1862 – August 6, 1939) was a German politician.

He was born in Speyer and became a member of the German Reichstag in 1898, representing the Catholic Centre Party (Germany) until 1914.

Speck was president of the Bavarian People's Party from 1918 to 1929.
