= Heinrich Held =

German politician (1868–1938)

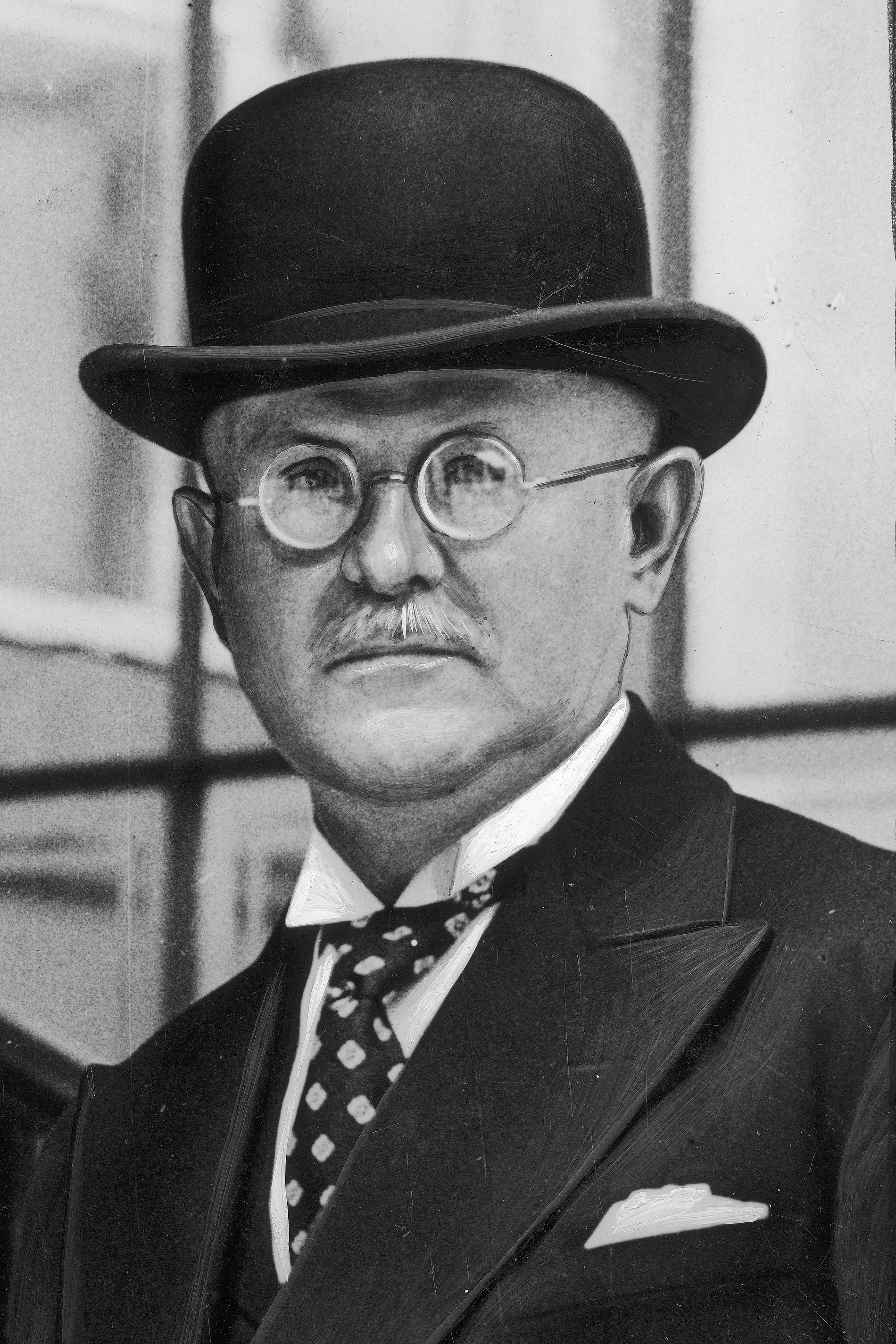
- Held, circa 1933

Minister President of Bavaria
- In office 2 July 1924 – 9 March 1933
- Preceded by: Eugen Ritter von Knilling
- Succeeded by: Ludwig Siebert

Minister for Commerce, Industry and Trade
- In office 1927–1932

Minister for Agriculture
- In office 1930–1932

Minister for Economy
- In office 1932–1933

Personal details
- Born: 6 June 1868 Erbach, Hesse-Nassau, Kingdom of Prussia, North German Confederation
- Died: 4 August 1938 (aged 70) Regensburg, Nazi Germany
- Party: Bavarian People's Party
- Occupation: Journalist

Heinrich Held (6 June 1868 – 4 August 1938) was a German Catholic politician and Minister President of Bavaria. He was forced out of office by the Nazi takeover in Germany in 1933.

== Biography ==
Heinrich Held was born in Erbach in the Taunus, then a part of the Prussian province of Hesse-Nassau. His father, Johannes Held, was a local farmer and musician, his mother was Susanne Held née Kaiser.

Held studied law at the universities of Strasbourg, Marburg and Heidelberg before becoming a journalist in Strasbourg in 1896. He moved to Heidelberg the year after and became editor of the Regensburger Morgenblatts, a newspaper in the Bavarian city of Regensburg, in 1899. He moved to take up the same position at the Regensburger Anzeiger the year after. From 1906, he became a co-owner of those two newspapers and began his political career as a speaker in the conservative-Christian workers' movements. From 1921, Held also served as the president of the Deutscher Katholikentag, a regular gathering and discussion forum for Roman Catholics throughout Germany.

In 1933, Held's son Philipp became one of the first inmates at the Dachau concentration camp. On 4 August 1938, Heinrich Held died in Regensburg.

== Political career ==
Held was elected to the Bavarian parliament in 1907, standing for the Bavarian branch of the Centre Party, and he held his seat there until 1933. He belonged to the left wing of his party and was mainly interested in fiscal politics. He quickly rose to power within the party, becoming his party's leader in the parliament in 1914 and leader of the party itself shortly afterwards. In 1917, Held was elevated to the title of Geheimer Hofrat, a member of the Bavarian privy council.

In 1918, after the end of the monarchy in Bavaria, Held was one of the co-founders of the Bavarian People's Party (BVP), transforming the Centre's Bavarian branch into a new party which emphasized conservative elements and states' rights. Held remained the parliamentary leader of the new party. In July 1924, after the resignation of Eugen Ritter von Knilling, Held became prime minister of Bavaria. His government was supported by his own party, the national-conservative German National People's Party, the national-liberal German People's Party and the Bavarian Peasants' League. His policies as prime minister were aimed at reconciliation with the federal government and moving away from separatism. In 1924, he also signed a concordat with the Holy See.

Held ran in the first round of the 1925 German presidential elections and achieved 3.7 percent of the votes. In the second round, his party supported the right-wing candidate Paul von Hindenburg instead of the Centre Party's candidate Wilhelm Marx. In 1930, Held's government lost its majority in the Bavarian parliament but continued in office as a minority administration. From 1930 to 1932, Held also held the offices of Minister of State for Commerce, Industry and Trade and Minister of State for Agriculture. Both were merged to form the Ministry for the Economy, which he held from 1932 to 1933.

Held continued to advocate states' rights within the German Republic, publishing papers on the subject. In 1932, he sharply criticized the removal of the Prussian prime minister Otto Braun by Chancellor Franz von Papen, a move he considered an unlawful interference by the federal government in state matters. Later in 1932, an attempt, supported by a wide coalition of parties, to counter the Nazis by establishing Rupprecht, Crown Prince of Bavaria, as a Staatskommisar for Bavaria with dictatorial powers, failed due to the hesitance of the Bavarian government under Held.

On 9 March 1933, the Bavarian government itself was forcibly removed from office by the Nazis. Initially, Held resisted the attempts by the SA to overthrow his government, but he received no support from the German army, which had orders from Berlin to stay out of domestic politics, so that ultimately he could not hold off the Nazis. The office of Bavarian prime minister was abolished and replaced by a Reichsstatthalter, a purely administrative position with no political power. Held retired from politics, first escaping to Lugano, Switzerland, where his son Josef lived, later withdrawing to Regensburg. His government pension as a former prime minister was revoked by the Nazis.

== Honors ==
- Honorary doctorate at the universities of Munich, Innsbruck and Würzburg

== See also ==
- List of minister-presidents of Bavaria

== Bibliography ==
- Website of the Deutsches Historisches Museum, Berlin - Biography of Heinrich Held (in German)
- Opfer und Verfolgte des NS-Regimes aus bayerischen Parlamenten (in German)
- Universitätsbibliothek Regensburg - Bosls bayrische Biographie - Heinrich Held (in German), author: Karl Bosl, publisher: Pustet, page 327

Political offices
Preceded by Eugen Ritter von Knilling	Prime Minister of Bavaria; 1924 – 1933	Succeeded by Ludwig Siebert
