= Hugo Graf von und zu Lerchenfeld auf Köfering und Schönberg =

Bavarian politician and Prime Minister

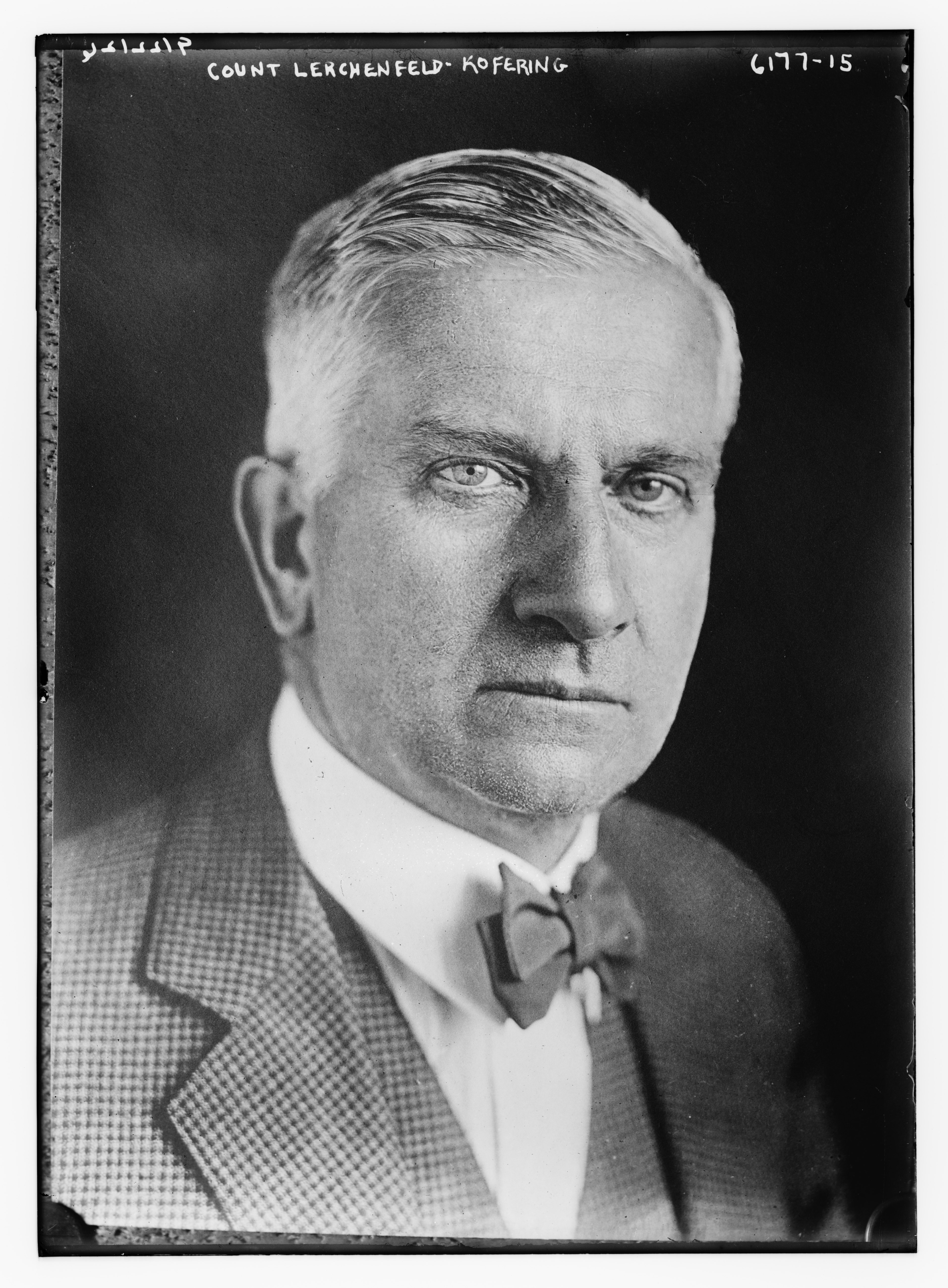
- Count Lerchenfeld-Köfering in 1924

Prime Minister of Bavaria
- In office 21 September 1921 – 2 November 1922
- Preceded by: Gustav Ritter von Kahr
- Succeeded by: Eugen von Knilling

German Ambassador to Austria
- In office 1926–1931
- Preceded by: Maximilian Pfeiffer
- Succeeded by: Kurt Rieth

Minister of Justice
- In office 1921–1922

Personal details
- Born: 21 August 1871 Köfering, Bavaria, Germany
- Died: 13 April 1944 (aged 72) Munich, Munich-Upper Bavaria, Germany
- Party: Bavarian People's Party
- Occupation: Civil servant

Hugo Maximilian Philippus Ludwig Franziskus Graf von und zu Lerchenfeld auf Köfering und Schönberg (21 August 1871 – 13 April 1944), known as Graf von Lerchenfeld-Köfering and as Lerchenfeld for short, was a Bavarian conservative politician and the prime minister of Bavaria from 1921 to 1922. He belonged to the Bavarian People's Party, a conservative, strongly federalist party in Bavaria, formed after the World War I.

== Early life ==
Hugo Graf von und zu Lerchenfeld was born on 21 August 1871 in Köfering as the son of Ludwig Graf von und zu Lerchenfeld and Clara Grafin von Bray-Steinburg.

== Career ==
He originally studied law, graduating in 1893. He was employed as a Bavarian government official from 1897 to 1914, later changing to the Imperial government, working as a civil administrator from 1915 to 1918 in the formerly Russian part of Poland, after this in the German foreign department. After the First World War, he became the federal representative of the German government in the state of Hessen.

Hugo Lerchenfeld was appointed as Bavarian prime minister on 21 September 1921, succeeding Gustav Ritter von Kahr, who had resigned earlier. He was chosen by a coalition of conservative parties. He was not a high ranking party official at this stage but rather a respected civil administrator, with a good relationship to the SPD too. He managed during his time in office to largely defuse the crisis caused through Bavarian attempts to break free of the German Republic and the federal government's attempts to gain more control over state politics. He also additionally held the post of minister of justice.

He faced a coalition crisis in July 1922 due to renewed disputes with the federal government, losing much of his support in his own party, but he managed to solve the crisis once more. Eventually, for this reason, he had to resign from office on 2 November 1922, being accused of not having achieved enough for Bavaria in the negotiations.

Lerchenfeld continued to serve as a civil servant in the German administration after this, as German ambassador to Austria from 1926 to 1931 and then being involved in legal negotiations with Belgium in 1931.

== Personal life ==
He was married to Ethel Wyman, of New York.

Count Lerchenfeld died on 13 April 1944 in Munich.

Graf, as in the name of Hugo Graf von und zu Lerchenfeld, is not a name but a noble title, known in English as count.

== See also ==
- List of minister-presidents of Bavaria

== Bibliography ==
- Historisches Lexikon Bayerns (in German).
- Universitätsbibliothek Regensburg - Bosls bayrische Biographie - Hugo Graf von und zu Lerchenfeld (in German), author: Karl Bosl, publisher: Pustet, page 476.

Political offices
Preceded by Gustav Ritter von Kahr	Prime Minister of Bavaria; 1921 – 1922	Succeeded by Eugen von Knilling
