= Bavarian Peasants' League =

German Political party

Bavarian Peasants' League Bayerischer Bauernbund
- Founded: 1893
- Dissolved: 1933
- Ideology: Agrarianism; Bavarian nationalism Classical liberalism Conservatism; Protectionism

The Bavarian Peasants' League (German: Bayerischer Bauernbund, or BB) was a German political party in Bavaria from 1893 to 1933; in English it is also referred to as the Bavarian Farmers' League. The party represented the interests of Bavaria's rural population in the Bavarian state parliament and the German Reichstag. Its program was more liberal than those of most other agricultural interest groups of the era and strongly non-clerical. In 1922 it changed its name to the Bavarian Peasants' and Small Businesses' League (Bayerischer Bauern- und Mittelstandsbund) in a largely unsuccessful attempt to expand its voter base. With the rise of the Nazi Party, the BB's membership fell sharply. It disbanded in 1933, recommending that its members join Nazi agricultural groups.

== Founding ==
German agriculture entered a long period of crisis beginning with the 1873 depression. Chancellor Otto von Bismarck introduced protective tariffs on grain imports in 1878 and 1879 in response to surpluses from the United States and Russia that were significantly reducing prices for German farmers. Leo von Caprivi, who succeeded Bismarck in 1890, negotiated trade treaties with a number of European countries and reduced grain tariffs. The moves angered German farmers, particularly the politically powerful Junker class, many of whose members owned large agricultural states in Germany's Prussian east.

The German Agrarian League (Bund der Landwirte, BdL) was founded in Berlin in 1893 to promote the interests of agriculture in the face of Caprivi's reforms. It began almost immediately to solicit members in Lower Bavaria, but the attempt failed because many of the region's farmers were anti-Prussian and distrustful of the nobility that dominated the BdL's leadership. During the remainder of the year a series of regional groups were established across Bavaria. The majority of them came together in 1893 to form the Bavarian Peasants' League (Bayerischer Bauernbund, BB). It was initially more of an umbrella organization for the individual groups than a unified party.

== Policies under the Empire ==
The BB backed the German Agrarian League in its support of protectionism, but it remained anti-Prussian and Bavarian particularist. It fought for the interests of small and mid-sized farmers and called for large estates to be broken up. Even though its membership was largely Catholic, it opposed the Catholic Centre Party because it supported Caprivi's policies. The BB also went on record against the clericalism of both the Centre and the Bavarian People's Party (BVP). It wanted to separate church and state, nationalize the school system and abolish ecclesiastic school supervision. The party came to be labelled the "social democracy of the flatlands".

During most of its existence, the BB encompassed views that ranged from far left to far right. Its membership numbers varied considerably because groups regularly split off from the party or joined it. In Lower Bavaria, the party tended to be more radical than in Franconia or Swabia. In 1910, the majority of the Franconian branch joined national agrarian leagues. The split left the BB concentrated in "Old Bavaria" (Upper and Lower Bavaria plus the Upper Palatinate). Estimates of the BB's membership during the imperial period range from about 15,000 in 1896 to 7,000 in 1914. From 1924 to 1933, the number was relatively stable at about 35,000.

=== Antisemitism ===
There was a strong antisemitic element in the party during the imperial period. Its 1900 statues barred Jews from joining, and from 1903 to 1907 its Reichstag members were part of a parliamentary interest group (the Economic Association) made up of overtly antisemitic Reichstag parties. In the Bavarian Landtag, the BB supported all antisemitic bills that were introduced until 1918. After the Franconians split away in 1910, the BB's antisemitism moderated. The party's staunch support of the Weimar Republic also limited its appeal to anti-Jewish elements in Bavaria after the end of World War I.

== Weimar Republic ==
During the German revolution of 1918–1919, the Bavarian Peasants' League supported Kurt Eisner and the Bavarian Soviet Republic. Under Eisner's direction, Karl Gandorfer, who headed the BB from 1919 to 1932, established a parliamentary farmers' council parallel to the workers' and soldiers' councils that had taken over across Germany, including in Bavaria. As head of the council, Gandorfer was a member of Eisner's provisional government and filled the 50-member body almost exclusively with members of the BB's left wing. It served as Bavaria's leading agricultural council until it was replaced by the Bavarian Chamber of Agriculture in March 1920. BVP members led the chamber until 1925, at which point Karl Prieger of the BB took over until 1933.

In an attempt to expand its political base into the non-agricultural middle class, the BB changed its name to the Bavarian Peasants' and Small Businesses' League (Bayerischer Bauern- und Mittelstandsbund) in 1922, but it had only limited success. Its best results in the Bavarian Landtag came in 1928 when it won 11.5% of the vote and seated 17 members. The BB provided the Bavarian agriculture minister in six cabinets.

From 31 March to 22 November 1922, Anton Fehr of the BB was minister of food and agriculture in the national government's second Wirth cabinet, but In the Reichstag the party never had more than a minor presence and needed to form alliances with other parties in order to achieve parliamentary strength. In 1928, the party joined forces with related groups to form the German Farmers' Party for Reichstag elections.

The BB's support dropped sharply in both the Bavarian Landtag and the Reichstag elections after 1930. Most of the party's leadership continued to support the Republic after the Nazis came to power in 1933, but many members and lower party officials shifted to the Nazi Party or, to a lesser extent, the Bavarian People's Party. On 11 April the BB dissolved and urged its members to join Nazi farmers' organizations.

== Election results ==
Bavarian Landtag
	1893	1899	1905	1907	1912	1919	1920	1924	1928	1932	1933
Votes	missing	76,489	224,386	84,394	65,355	310,165	234,918	213,450	382,104	252,256	101,705
Percent	8.3	5.4	8.9	10.5	6.8	9.1	7.9	7.1	11.5	6.5	2.3
Seats	9	5	6	7	5	16	12	10	17	9	3

German Reichstag
	1893	1898	1903	1907	1912	1919	1920	May 1924	Dec 1924	1928 (Note: Beginning with the 1928 Reichstag election, the Bavarian Peasants' League ran on a combined list as the German Farmers' Party)	1930	July 1932	Nov 1932	March 1933
Votes	43,128	130,724	65,815	41,137	48,219	275,127	218,596	168,996	298,095	361,571	339,434	137,133	149,026	114,048
Percent	0.6	1.7	0.7	0.4	0.4	0.9	0.8	0.6	1.0	1.2	1.0	0.4	0.4	0.3
Seats	2	4	2	0	2	5	4	3	5	8	6	2	3	2
