= List of Bavaria-related topics =

This is a list of articles relating to Bavaria. It does not include articles which are already properly listed within other articles included below; such as towns and cities.

Please add any missing, relevant articles of which you are aware.

== Culture ==
- Culture of Bavaria

=== Art ===
- Celtic art
- List of theatres in Bavaria
  - List of theatres in Munich
- Migration Period art

=== Language ===
- Austro-Bavarian German
- Alemannic German
- East Franconian German

=== National symbols and icons ===
- Coat of arms of Bavaria
- Flag of Bavaria
- Bayernhymne
- Bavaria statue
- Coat of arms of Munich
- Münchner Kindl

=== Bavarian people ===
- Bavarian people

== Geography and demographics ==
- List of places in Bavaria
- List of rivers of Bavaria

== History ==
- History of Bavaria
- Bavarian Army

== Government and politics ==
- Politics of Bavaria:
  - List of minister-presidents of Bavaria
  - Bavaria state election, 2008
  - Landtag of Bavaria

== See also ==
- Lists of country-related topics – similar lists for other countries
