= Fourth Held cabinet =

- Cabinet of Bavaria

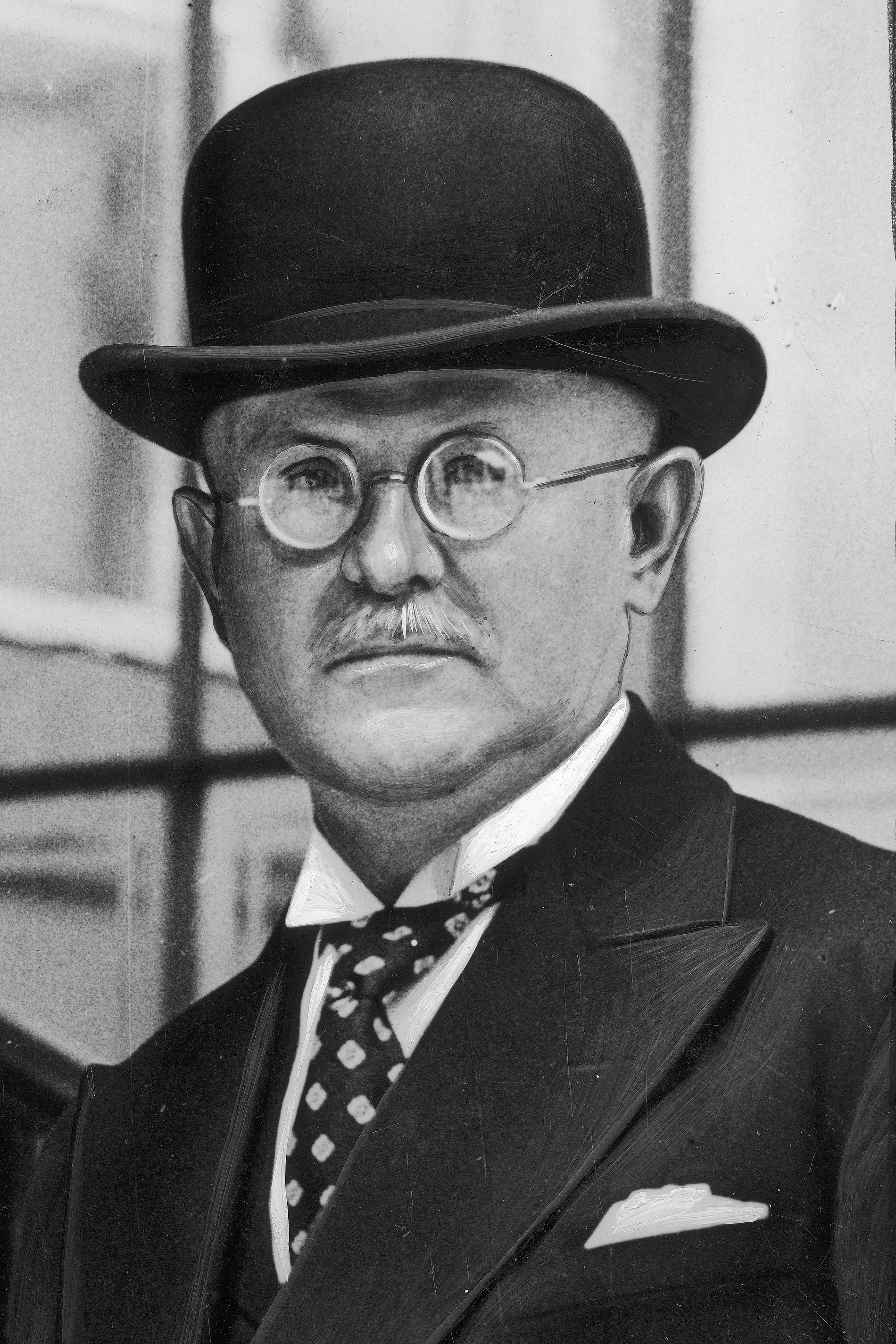
- Date formed: May 1932
- Date dissolved: 27 March 1933

People and organisations
- Minister President: Heinrich Held
- Member parties: BVP; BMP
- Status in legislature: caretaker government
- Opposition parties: NSDAP; SPD; BB; KPD

History
- Election: 1932 Bavarian state election
- Predecessor: Held III Cabinet
- Successor: Epp Cabinet

The Held IV Cabinet (German: Kabinett Held IV) was the state government of the German state of Bavaria from May 1932 to 27 March 1933. The cabinet was headed by Minister President Heinrich Held and was formed by the Bavarian People's Party in a caretaker government with the DNVP. It was the last state government to be taken over by the Nazis after their rise to power.

== Composition ==
Ministry	Minister	Took office	Left office	Party
Minister President	Heinrich Held	May 1932	March 27 1933	BVP
State Ministry of Economic Affairs and Labour	Heinrich Held	May 1932	March 27 1933	BVP
State Ministry of Foreign Affairs	Heinrich Held	May 1932	March 27 1933	BVP
State Ministry of the Interior	Karl Stützel	May 1932	March 27 1933	BVP
State Ministry of Justice	Franz Gürtner	May 1932	June 6 1932	BMP
State Ministry of Justice	Heinrich Spangenberger	June 6 1932	March 27 1933	BMP
State Ministry of Finance	Fritz Schäffer	May 1932	March 27 1933	BVP
State Ministry for Education and Cultural Affairs	Franz Goldenberger	May 1932	March 27 1933	BVP
