= Bayerischer Defiliermarsch =

Bavarian military march

"Bayerischer Defiliermarsch", Armeemarschsammlung II, 146, is a well-known military march of the 19th century, composed by Adolf Scherzer in Ingolstadt sometime in 1850.

== History ==
It started as a march for a regiment in Ingolstadt but gained popularity in the Austro-Prussian War and Franco-Prussian War. It is said that Ludwig II of Bavaria himself decided to raise the march as official Bayerischen Avancier- und Defiliermarsch during military parades. It is a household name and still a very well known symbol of the Free State of Bavaria and together with the Bayernhymne part of its national symbols. The march is being played during events and appearances of the Bavarian head of states, political contenders and instead of Preußens Gloria at official state visits in Bavaria. Luchino Visconti's film about Ludwig II uses the music during the coronation festivities. The "Defiliermarsch" was played during the 1972 Olympic Games in Munich and as well as German contribution to the inauguration of the 1976 Summer Olympics in Montreal.

Due to its tremendous popularity among Bavarians, it is widely regarded the country's "secret anthem".
