= Hermann Mager =

German politician

Hermann Mager (May 30 1872 – July 27 1947) was a German politician and teacher.

Mager was born in Heidingsfeld (Würzburg) on May 30, 1872. He graduated in 1898, obtaining qualification to work as secondary school teacher, after which he worked as a private tutor. In 1901 he became a teacher at the Wilhelmsgymnasium in Munich, but in the same year he transferred to the Humanistische Gymnasium in Rosenheim. In 1912 he transferred to the Humanistische Gymnasium in Schweinfurt. In 1914 he came into conflict with the authorities, due to his pacifist stance and homosexuality. In 1915, he was hired as a teacher at the Gymnasium in Aschaffenburg, having been able to obtain employment due to the prevailing shortage of teachers in the area. He was drafted to the army in 1916, serving in an infantry unit based in Kaiserslautern-Zweibrücken. He was taken prisoner of war by Romanian forces, returning to Germany in 1919.

He was a member of the Independent Social Democratic Party of Germany (USPD). Mager joined the Communist Party of Germany (KPD) in 1920, his brother Georg was also a KPD member. However, politically he was primarily a pacifist. In 1920 the Bavarian Disciplinary Court initiated a case against Mager. In late 1920 he and his brother Georg were banned from working as teachers. The judgement made explicit mention of Mager's communist views and activism as reason behind the expulsion from teaching.

In 1922 he joined the German League for Human Rights.

He was elected to the Landtag of Bavaria in the 1924 election, standing as a KPD candidate in the Munich IX-X constituency. In the Landtag he joined the Committee for Election Observation (June 27, 1924), the Committee on Salary Scheme (July 9, 1924) and the committee on the Rules of Procedure (June 27, 1924). On April 27, 1928 he became an alternate member of the Standing Committee of the Landtag.

In 1929 he became vice chairman of the Munich branch of the German Peace Society.

Mager died in Konstein on July 27, 1947.
