= Altbayern =

Altbayern: Oidbayern; Altbaiern
- Cultural region
- Flag Coat of arms
- Anthem: "Bayernhymne"
- Country: Germany
- Largest cities: 1. Munich 2. Regensburg 3. Ingolstadt 4. Landshut 5. Rosenheim
- Time zone: UTC+1 (CET)
  - Summer (DST): UTC+2 (CEST)

Altbayern (German pronunciation: [ˈaltˌbaɪɐn]; Bavarian: Oidbayern, also written Altbaiern, English: "Old Bavaria") is the territory and people of the three oldest parts of the present Free State of Bavaria, which were earlier known as Kurbayern (English: "Electoral Bavaria") after the former Electorate of Bavaria.

Altbayern mainly consists of the following Bavarian Regierungsbezirke (administrative regions):

- Upper Bavaria (Oberbayern)
- Lower Bavaria (Niederbayern)
- Upper Palatinate (Oberpfalz)

Since the term Altbayern is based on the cultural difference compared to Franconia (i.e. Upper, Middle and Lower Franconia) as well as with Swabia (i.e. Bavarian Swabia), some areas surrounding the Upper Franconian town of Wunsiedel as well as the Swabian Aichach-Friedberg district are counted as part of Altbayern, because they share the same history, dialect and culture as the three previously mentioned districts. Strictly speaking, the Upper Austrian Innviertel also belongs to Altbayern, since it was part of the Bavarian electorate until it was attached to the Archduchy of Austria according to the 1779 Treaty of Teschen.

The spelling "Baiern" was changed to "Bayern" at the start of the reign of King Ludwig I, firstly due to his love for Ancient Greek culture, and secondly to reflect the recent annexation of large, previously non-Bavarian areas like Swabia and Franconia. Ideally, "Baiern" would be a logical term for the present Altbayern, but since there is no difference in sound between the words "Baiern" and "Bayern" and these can be confused in writing, the term "Altbayern" is used.

The Franconian and Swabian territories were not merged into the Kingdom of Bavaria until the German mediatisation, and the 1815 Congress of Vienna, hence they still have strong cultural as well as linguistic differences from Altbayern. Bavarian dialects are spoken in Altbayern (and adjacent Austrian lands), as distinct from East Franconian and Alemannic (Swabian) in the Franconian regions and Bavarian Swabia, respectively.

On Bayerischer Rundfunk television a regular program called "Schwaben & Altbayern" that discusses current political and cultural topics of Bavaria's southern regions.
