= Michael Öchsner =

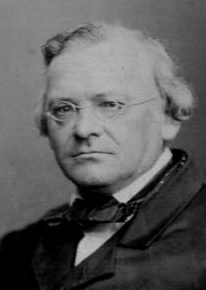
- Michael Öchsner in 1890
- Born: 2 February 1816; Munich, Kingdom of Bavaria, German Confederation
- Died: 8 October 1893 (aged 77); Munich, Kingdom of Bavaria, German Empire
- Occupation: Music teacher

Michael Öchsner (2 February 1816 – 8 October 1893) was a German poet. Born in Munich and raised by a music teacher, Öchsner grew up to be a teacher. Of all the poems he wrote, one was set to music by Konrad Max Kunz as the Bavarian anthem. Besides that, he wrote songbooks set in his tune. Michael Öchsner died on 8 October 1893, at the age of 77.
