= List of places in Bavaria =

This is a list of geographical features in the state of Bavaria, Germany.

- List of mountains of Bavaria
- List of rivers of Bavaria
- List of lakes in Bavaria

For cities:

- List of cities in Bavaria by population

== See also ==
- Bavarian Forest National Park
- Berchtesgaden National Park
- Hallertau
- Nördlinger Ries
- Partnach Gorge
