= Konrad Max Kunz =

German composer (1812–1875)

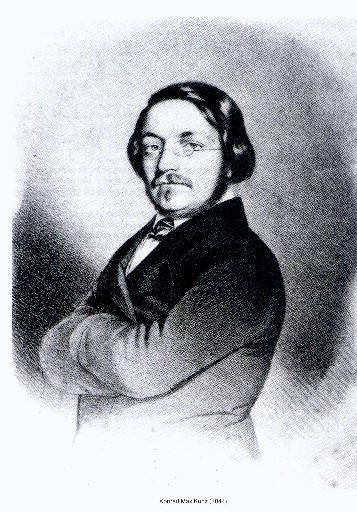
Konrad Max Kunz

Konrad Max Kunz (April 29, 1812 – August 3, 1875) was a German composer. He composed the "Bayernhymne", the official anthem of Bavaria.
