= Bavaria =

State in Germany

Free State of Bavaria Freistaat Bayern (German) Freistoot Bayern (Bavarian)
- State
- Flag Coat of arms
- Anthem: "Bayernhymne" (German) "Bavaria Hymn"
- Location of Bavaria in Germany
- Interactive map of Free State of Bavaria
- Coordinates: 49°N 11.5°E
- Country: Germany
- Capital (and largest city): Munich

Government
  - Body: Landtag of Bavaria
  - Minister-President: Markus Söder (CSU)
  - Governing parties: CSU / FW
  - Bundesrat votes: 6 (of 69)
  - Bundestag seats: 101 (of 630) (as of 2025)

Area
  - Total: 70,541.58 km^{2} (27,236.26 sq mi)

Population (2023-12-31)
  - Total: 13,435,062
  - Rank: 2nd in Germany
  - Density: 190.4559/km^{2} (493.2786/sq mi)
- Demonym: Bavarian

GDP
  - Total: €824.243 billion (2025)
  - Per capita: €62,212 (2025)
- Time zone: UTC+1 (CET)
  - Summer (DST): UTC+2 (CEST)
- ISO 3166 code: DE-BY
- NUTS Region: DE2
- HDI (2023): 0.967 very high (4th of 16)
- Website: www.bayern.de

Bavaria, (Note: /bəˈvɛəriə/ bə-VAIR-ee-ə; German: Bayern [ˈbaɪɐn]) officially the Free State of Bavaria, (Note: German: Freistaat Bayern [ˈfʁaɪʃtaːt ˈbaɪɐn]; Bavarian: Freistoot Bayern) is a landlocked state of Germany. It borders the states of Baden-Württemberg to the west, Hesse to the north-west, and Thuringia and Saxony to the north, as well as the countries of Switzerland and Austria to the south and the Czech Republic to the east. The state's capital and largest city is Munich; other major cities include Nuremberg, Augsburg, Regensburg, and Ingolstadt. With an area of 70,550 square kilometres (27,249 sq mi), it is the largest German state, and with 13.08 million inhabitants, the second-most populous.

The history of Bavaria begins with the settlement of Celtic tribes during the Iron Age. The territory was then ruled by the Roman Empire and incorporated into the provinces of Raetia and Noricum in the first century AD. Following the collapse of the Roman Empire, the Duchy of Bavaria was created in Francia in 555 AD. It later became part of East Francia and controlled territory in modern-day Austria, Slovenia and Italy. Within the Holy Roman Empire it gained elector status in 1623 during the Thirty Years' War, eventually becoming the Kingdom of Bavaria in 1806. Following the Unification of Germany, Bavaria remained a kingdom within the German Empire until the end of World War I. The modern state of Bavaria was established in 1945 and became part of West Germany in 1949.

The culture of Bavaria is heavily influenced by its Catholic heritage. The Bavarian language is a group of German dialects in both Bavaria and Austria with around 12 million speakers, making it the largest German dialect. Other major cultural influences of Bavaria include its cuisine, consisting of foods such as Weißwurst and Leberkäse, its architecture, largely focused on Alpine symbolism in southern Alpine regions, and its major festivals such as the Oktoberfest in Munich.

Modern Bavaria's borders consist of Altbayern as well as parts of the historical regions of Franconia and Swabia. There are 7 administrative regions of Bavaria, 3 of which are in Franconia and Altbayern and 1 of which is in Swabia. Bavaria is among the wealthiest and most innovative regions in both Germany and Europe, driven by a highly diversified economy with strengths in manufacturing, engineering, technology, and scientific research. Bavaria has a tradition of conservatism; the CSU has been the dominant party in Bavarian politics for decades and is known as the 'sister party' of the national CDU, being collectively known as the Union.

== History ==
=== Antiquity ===
Though Bavaria has been occupied by humans since the Paleolithic era, Celtic tribes of the Bronze Age, such as the Boii were the first documented inhabitants of the Bavarian Alps. In June 2023, archeologists discovered a bronze sword, dated to the 14th century BC, in a former Celtic village; its workmanship so well-preserved "it almost shines." During the early modern era, these peoples were retrospectively romanticized as the most ancient culture of Bavaria, even though the Indo-European languages were relative newcomers to the region. Evidence of the ancient Straubing culture, Únětice culture and La Tène culture may be found in what is Bavaria today.

Archeologists know of a large Celtic Iron Age settlement which was founded in Feldmoching-Hasenbergl north of suburban Munich. Evidence suggests up to 500 people lived in the village from 450 BC. Local life appears to have centred around what could be a town hall or temple, and continued in different forms up to 1000 AD. In Manching, Upper Bavaria, an unfortified and semi-urban society appears to have prospered between the 3rd century BC until the early 1st century AD. The settlement featured food ovens, pottery kilns and metallurgical furnaces. By 200 BC the community there was active in trade—finds of coins, along with an icon-like golden tree suggest it was trading with distant Italo-Greek communities.

In the 1st century BC, Bavaria was conquered by the Roman Empire. An imperial military camp was built 60 km north-west of where Munich sits today, under orders of Augustus Caesar, between 8 and 5 BC. The camp later became the town of Augusta Vindelicorum, which would become the capital of the Roman province of Raetia. Another fort was founded in 60 AD, west of modern-day Manching, as evidenced by a legionnaire's sandal found near remains of an ancient fort.

=== Middle Ages ===
In the 530s, the Merovingian dynasty incorporated the kingdom of Thuringia after their defeat by the Franks. The Baiuvarii were Frankicised a century later. The Lex Thuringorum documents an upper class nobility of adalingi. From about 554 to 788, the house of Agilolfing ruled the Duchy of Bavaria, ending with Tassilo III who was deposed by Charlemagne.

Tassilo I of Bavaria tried unsuccessfully to hold the eastern frontier against the expansion of Slavic peoples and the Pannonian Avars around 600. Garibald II seems to have achieved a balance of power between 610 and 616.

At Hugbert's death in 735, the duchy passed to Odilo of Bavaria from the neighboring Alemannia. Odilo issued a Lex Baiuvariorum for Bavaria, completed the process of church organization in partnership with Saint Boniface in 739, and tried to intervene in Frankish succession disputes by fighting for the claims of the Carolingian dynasty. He was defeated near Augsburg in 743 but continued to rule until his death in 748.

Saint Boniface completed the people's conversion to Christianity in the early 8th century. Tassilo III of Bavaria succeeded to rule Bavaria. He initially ruled under Frankish oversight but began to function independently from 763 onward. He was particularly noted for founding new monasteries and for expanding eastwards, oppressing Slavs in the eastern Alps and along the Danube and colonizing these lands. After 781, however, Charlemagne began to exert pressure and Tassilo III was deposed in 788. Dissenters attempted a coup against Charlemagne at Regensburg in 792, led by Pepin the Hunchback.

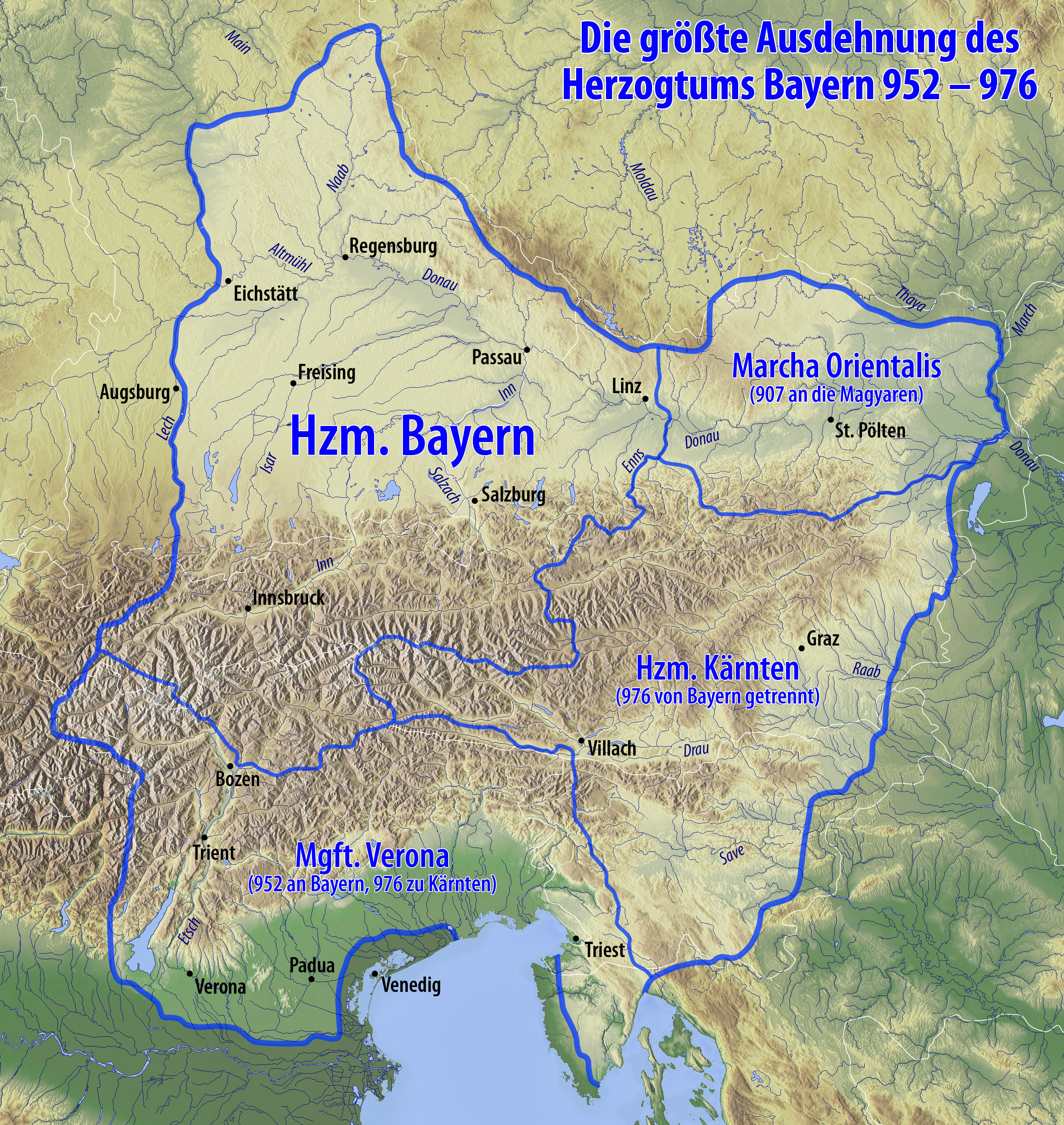
A map of Bavaria in the 10th century

With the revolt of Henry II, Duke of Bavaria in 976, Bavaria lost large territories in the south and southeast.

One of the most important dukes of Bavaria was Henry the Lion of the house of Welf, founder of Munich, and de facto the second most powerful man in the empire as the ruler of two duchies. When in 1180, Henry the Lion was deposed as Duke of Saxony and Bavaria by his cousin, Frederick I, Holy Roman Emperor (a.k.a. "Barbarossa" for his red beard), Bavaria was awarded as fief to the Wittelsbach family, counts palatinate of Schyren ("Scheyern" in modern German). They ruled for 738 years, from 1180 to 1918. In 1180, however, Styria was also separated from Bavaria. The Electorate of the Palatinate by Rhine (Kurpfalz in German) was also acquired by the House of Wittelsbach in 1214, which they would subsequently hold for six centuries.

The first of several divisions of the duchy of Bavaria occurred in 1255. With the extinction of the Hohenstaufen in 1268, Swabian territories were acquired by the Wittelsbach dukes. Emperor Louis the Bavarian acquired Brandenburg, Tyrol, Holland and Hainaut for his House but released the Upper Palatinate for the Palatinate branch of the Wittelsbach in 1329. That time also Salzburg finally became independent from the Duchy of Bavaria.

In the 14th and 15th centuries, upper and lower Bavaria were repeatedly subdivided. Four Duchies existed after the division of 1392: Bavaria-Straubing, Bavaria-Landshut, Bavaria-Ingolstadt and Bavaria-Munich. In 1506 with the Landshut War of Succession, the other parts of Bavaria were reunited, and Munich became the sole capital. The country became a center of the Jesuit-inspired Counter-Reformation.

=== Electorate of Bavaria ===
In 1623, early in the Thirty Years' War, the Bavarian duke replaced his relative the Elector Palatine among the Holy Roman Empire's powerful prince-elector, gaining both a vote in determining the Emperor thenceforth and special legal status under the Empire's laws. During the early and mid-18th century, the ambitions of the Bavarian prince-electors led to several wars with Austria as well as to occupations by Austria during the War of the Spanish Succession and the War of the Austrian Succession; on one occasion, the Bavarian House of Wittelsbach secured the election of one of its own members rather than a Habsburg as emperor.

To mark the unification of Bavaria and the Electoral Palatinate, both being principal Wittelsbach territories, Elector Maximilian IV Joseph was crowned king of Bavaria. King Maximilian Joseph was quick to change the coat of arms. The various heraldic symbols were replaced and a classical Wittelsbach pattern introduced. The white and blue lozenges symbolized the unity of the territories within the Bavarian kingdom.

The new state also comprised the Duchy of Jülich and Berg as these on their part were in personal union with the Palatinate.

=== Kingdom of Bavaria ===
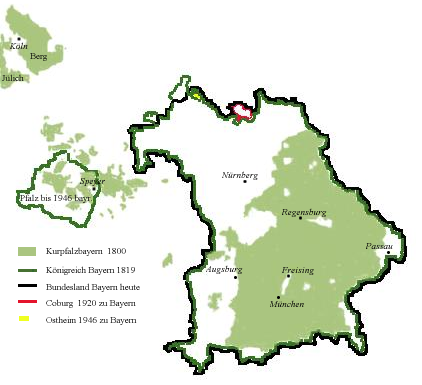
A map of Bavaria in the 19th century

When the Holy Roman Empire dissolved under Napoleon's onslaught, Bavaria became a kingdom in 1806 and joined the Confederation of the Rhine.

The Duchy of Jülich was ceded to France and the Electoral Palatinate was divided between France and the Grand Duchy of Baden. The Duchy of Berg was given to Joachim Murat. The County of Tyrol and the federal state of Salzburg were temporarily annexed with Bavaria but eventually ceded to Austria at the Congress of Vienna. In return, Bavaria was allowed to annex the modern-day region of Palatinate to the west of the Rhine and Franconia in 1815.

Between 1799 and 1817, the leading minister, Count Montgelas, followed a strict policy of modernization copying Napoleonic France; he laid the foundations of centralized administrative structures that survived the monarchy and, in part, have retained core validity through to the 21st century. In May 1808, a first constitution was passed by Maximilian I, being modernized in 1818. This second version established a bicameral Parliament with a House of Lords (Kammer der Reichsräte) and a House of Commons (Kammer der Abgeordneten). That constitution was followed until the collapse of the monarchy at the end of World War I.

After the rise of Prussia in the early 18th century, Bavaria preserved its independence by playing off the rivalry of Prussia and Austria. Allied to Austria, it was defeated along with Austria in the 1866 Austro-Prussian War and was not incorporated into the North German Confederation of 1867, but the question of German unity was still alive. When France declared war on Prussia in 1870, all the south German states (Baden, Württemberg, Hessen-Darmstadt and Bavaria) aside from Austria joined the Prussian forces and ultimately joined the Federation, which was renamed Deutsches Reich (German Empire) in 1871.

Bavaria continued as a monarchy, and retained some special rights within the federation (such as railways and postal services and control of its army in peace times).

=== Part of the German Empire ===
A map of Bavaria within the German Empire, which was formed in 1871 and ended in 1918

When Bavaria became part of the newly formed German Empire, this action was considered controversial by Bavarian nationalists who had wanted to retain independence from the rest of Germany, as had Austria.

As Bavaria had a heavily Catholic majority population, many people resented being ruled by the mostly Protestant northerners in Prussia. As a direct result of the Bavarian-Prussian feud, political parties formed to encourage Bavaria to break away and regain its independence.

In the early 20th century, Wassily Kandinsky, Paul Klee, Henrik Ibsen, and other artists were drawn to Bavaria, especially to the Schwabing district in Munich, a center of international artistic activity at the time.

=== Free State of Bavaria ===
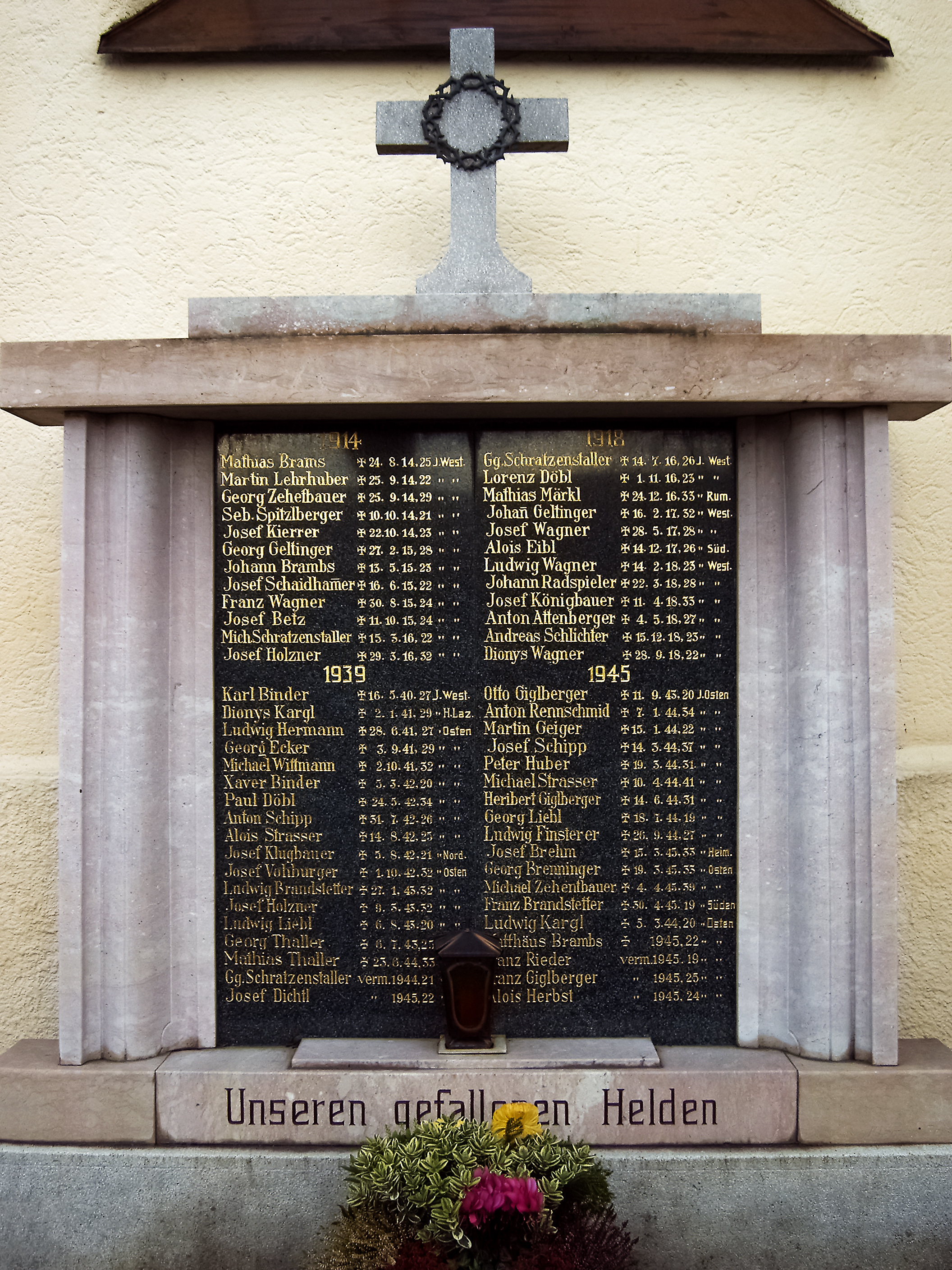
A memorial to soldiers who died in World War I and World War II in Kröning, Bavaria

World War I led to the abolition of the monarchy all over Germany in 1918. The Bavarian monarchy was the first to fall when on 8 November 1918 Socialist politician Kurt Eisner proclaimed the People's State of Bavaria. Eisner headed a new, republican government as minister-president. On 12 November, King Ludwig III signed the Anif declaration, releasing both civil and military officers from their oaths, which the Eisner government interpreted as an abdication.

After losing the January 1919 elections, Eisner was assassinated in February 1919, ultimately leading to a Communist revolt and the short-lived Bavarian Soviet Republic being proclaimed 6 April 1919. After violent suppression by elements of the German Army and notably the Freikorps, the Bavarian Soviet Republic fell in May 1919. The Bamberg Constitution (Bamberger Verfassung) was enacted on 12 or 14 August 1919 and came into force on 15 September 1919, placing the Free State of Bavaria inside the Weimar Republic.

Extremist activity further increased, notably the 1923 Beer Hall Putsch led by the Nazis, and Munich and Nuremberg became seen as strongholds of Nazism during the Weimar Republic and Nazi dictatorship. In the crucial German federal election, March 1933, the Nazis received around 43% of the votes cast in Bavaria.

As a manufacturing centre, Munich was heavily bombed during World War II and was occupied by United States Armed Forces, becoming a major part of the American Zone of Allied-occupied Germany, which lasted from 1945 to 1947, and then of Bizone.

The Rhenish Palatinate was detached from Bavaria in 1946 and made part of the new state Rhineland-Palatinate. In 1949, Bavaria became part of the Federal Republic of Germany, despite the Bavarian Parliament voting against adopting the Basic Law of Germany, mainly because it was seen as not granting sufficient powers to the individual states (Länder), but at the same time declared that it would accept it if two-thirds of the other Länder ratified it. All of the other states ratified it, so it became law. Thus, during the Cold War, Bavaria was part of West Germany.

=== Bavarian identity ===
Bavarians have often emphasized a separate national identity and considered themselves as "Bavarians" first, "Germans" second. In the 19th-century sense, an independent Kingdom of Bavaria existed from only 1806 to 1871. A separate Bavarian identity was emphasized more strongly when Bavaria joined the Prussia-dominated German Empire in 1871, while the Bavarian nationalists wanted to keep Bavaria as Catholic and an independent state. Aside from the minority Bavaria Party, most Bavarians now accept Bavaria as part of Germany.

Another consideration is that Bavaria is not culturally uniform. While inhabitants of Altbayern ("Old Bavaria"), the regions forming the historic Bavaria before further acquisitions in 1806–1815, speak a Bavarian dialect of German, Franconia in the north and Bavarian Swabia in the southwest have a distinct culture including different dialects of German, East Franconian and Swabian, respectively.

== Flags and coat of arms ==
=== Flags ===
Uniquely among German states, Bavaria has two official flags of equal status, one with a white and blue stripe, the other with white and blue diamond-shaped lozenges. Either may be used by civilians and government offices, who are free to choose between them. Unofficial versions of the flag, especially a lozenge style with coat of arms, are sometimes used by civilians.

=== Coat of arms ===
Bavaria has two official designs for its coat of arms; they are referred to as the "greater" (German: das große) coat of arms and the "lesser" (German: das kleine) coat of arms. Both were formally adopted by the Bavarian State Parliament on 5 June 1950.

Munich artist Eduard Ege designed the greater Bavarian coat of arms in 1946. He primarily based his design on the royal coat of arms of Ludwig I. His design includes several heraldic elements of historical significance for Bavaria.

- The Golden Lion: At the dexter chief, sable, a lion rampant Or, armed and langued gules. This represents the administrative region of Upper Palatinate.
- The "Franconian Rake": At the sinister chief, per fess dancetty, gules, and argent. This represents the administrative regions of Upper, Middle and Lower Franconia.
- The Blue "Pantier" (mythical creature from French heraldry, sporting a flame instead of a tongue): At the dexter base, argent, a Pantier rampant azure, armed Or and langued gules. This represents the regions of Lower and Upper Bavaria.
- The Three Lions: At the sinister base, Or, three lions passant guardant sable, armed and langued gules. This represents Swabia.
- The White-And-Blue inescutcheon: The inescutcheon of white and blue fusils askance was originally the coat of arms of the Counts of Bogen, adopted in 1247 by the House of Wittelsbach. The white-and-blue fusils are indisputably the emblem of Bavaria and these arms today symbolize Bavaria as a whole. Along with the People's Crown, it is officially used as the Minor Coat of Arms.
- The People's Crown (Volkskrone): The coat of arms is surmounted by a crown with a golden band inset with precious stones and decorated with five ornamental leaves. This crown first appeared in the coat of arms to symbolize sovereignty of the people after the royal crown was eschewed in 1923.

== Geography ==
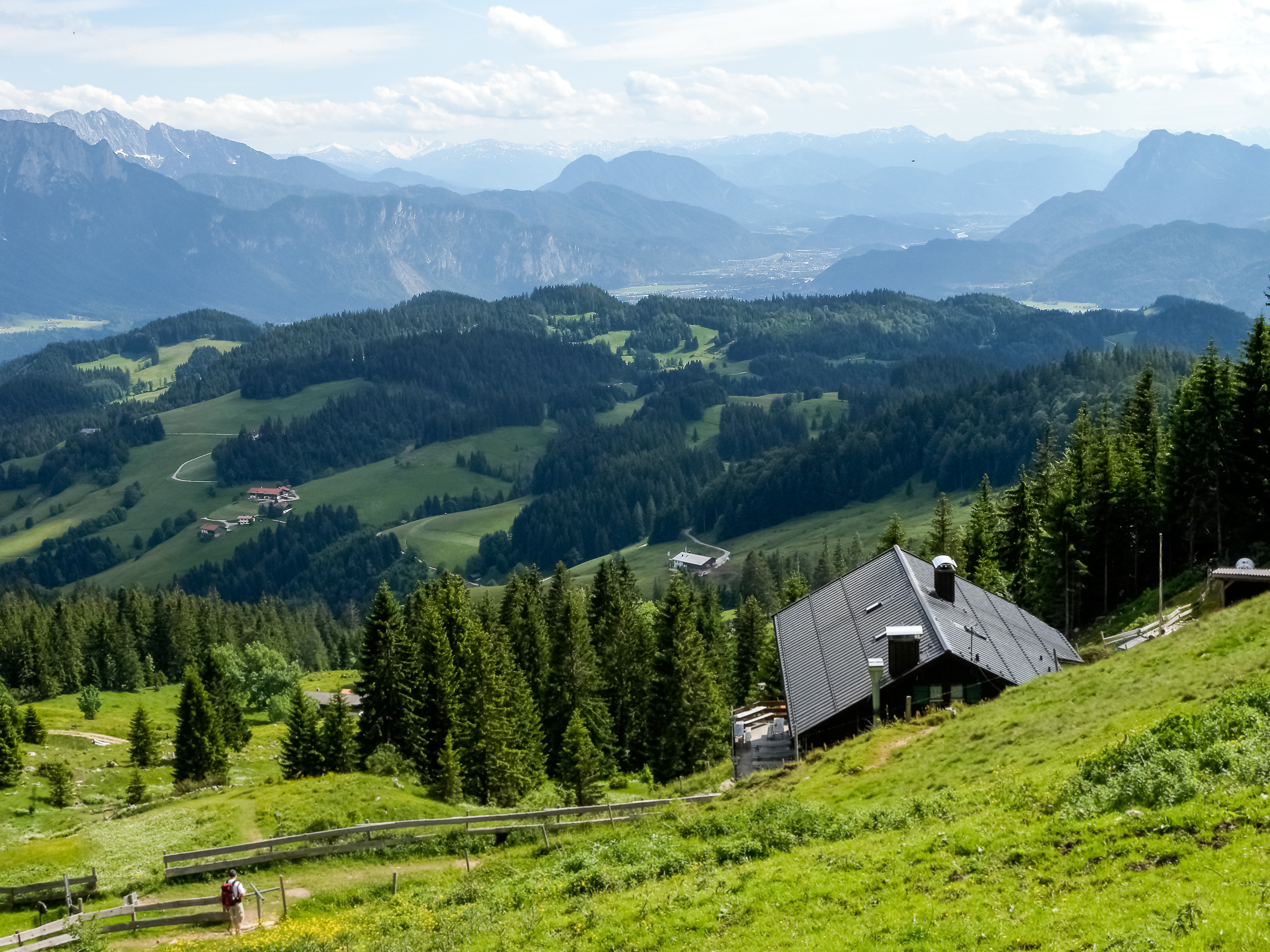
The Bavarian Alps (foreground) and Tyrol in Austria (background), including the Inn valley (center), Kaisergebirge (left), Pendling (right), and the snow-capped High Tauern (center left)

Bavaria shares international borders with Austria (Salzburg, Tyrol, Upper Austria and Vorarlberg) and the Czech Republic (Karlovy Vary, Plzeň and South Bohemian Regions), as well as with Switzerland (across Lake Constance to the Canton of St. Gallen).

Neighboring states within Germany are Baden-Württemberg, Hesse, Thuringia, and Saxony. Two major rivers flow through the state: the Danube (Donau) and the Main. The Bavarian Forest and the Bohemian Forest form the vast majority of the frontier with the Czech Republic and Bohemia.

The geographic center of the European Union is located in the northwestern corner of Bavaria.

=== Climate ===
At lower elevations the climate is classified according to Köppen's guide as "Cfb" or "Dfb". At higher altitudes the climate becomes "Dfc" and "ET".

The summer months have been getting hotter in recent years. For example, June 2019 was the warmest June in Bavaria since weather observations have been recorded and the winter 2019/2020 was 3 degrees Celsius warmer than the average temperature for many years all over Bavaria. On 20 December 2019 a record temperature of 20.2 °C (68.4 °F) was recorded in Piding. In general winter months are seeing more precipitation which is taking the form of rain more often than that of snow compared to the past. Extreme weather like the 2013 European floods or the 2019 European heavy snowfalls is occurring more and more often. One effect of the continuing warming is the melting of almost all Bavarian Alpine glaciers: Of the five glaciers of Bavaria only the Höllentalferner is predicted to exist over a longer time perspective. The Südliche Schneeferner has almost vanished since the 1980s.

== Administrative divisions ==
=== Administrative regions ===
The Bavarian administrative regions of Regierungsbezirke and Bezirke

Bavaria is divided into seven administrative regions called Regierungsbezirke (singular Regierungsbezirk). Each of these regions has a state agency called the Bezirksregierung (district government).

- Altbayern:
  1. Upper Palatinate (German: Oberpfalz)
  2. Upper Bavaria (Oberbayern)
  3. Lower Bavaria (Niederbayern)
- Franconia:
  1. Upper Franconia (Oberfranken)
  2. Middle Franconia (Mittelfranken)
  3. Lower Franconia (Unterfranken)
- Swabia:
  1. Swabia (Schwaben)

=== Bezirke ===
Bezirke (regional districts) are the third communal layer in Bavaria; the others are the Landkreise and the Gemeinden or Städte. The Bezirke in Bavaria are territorially identical with the Regierungsbezirke, but they are self-governing regional corporation, having their own parliaments. In the other larger states of Germany, there are only Regierungsbezirke as administrative divisions and no self-governing entities at the level of the Regierungsbezirke as the Bezirke in Bavaria.

==== Population and area ====
Bezirk	Coat of arms	Capital	Population (2025)		Area (km^{2})		No. municipalities	
Lower Bavaria		Landshut	1,259,204	9.50%	10,330	14.6%	258	12.5%
Lower Franconia		Würzburg	1,318,817	9.95%	8,531	12.1%	308	15.0%
Middle Franconia		Ansbach	1,795,909	13.56%	7,245	10.3%	210	10.2%
Swabia		Augsburg	1,933,313	14.59%	9,992	14.2%	340	16.5%
Upper Franconia		Bayreuth	1,055,758	7.97%	7,231	10.2%	214	10.4%
Upper Bavaria		Munich	4,764,548	35.96%	17,530	24.8%	500	24.3%
Upper Palatinate		Regensburg	1,121,379	8.46%	9,691	13.7%	226	11.0%
Total			13,248,928	100.0%	70,549	100.0%	2,056	100.0%

=== Districts ===
A map of Bavaria's districts

The second communal layer is made up of 71 rural districts (called Landkreise, singular Landkreis) that are comparable to counties, as well as the 25 independent cities (Kreisfreie Städte, singular Kreisfreie Stadt), both of which share the same administrative responsibilities.

Rural districts:

1. Aichach-Friedberg
2. Altötting
3. Amberg-Sulzbach
4. Ansbach
5. Aschaffenburg
6. Augsburg
7. Bad Kissingen
8. Bad Tölz-Wolfratshausen
9. Bamberg
10. Bayreuth
11. Berchtesgadener Land
12. Cham
13. Coburg
14. Dachau
15. Deggendorf
16. Dillingen
17. Dingolfing-Landau
18. Donau-Ries
19. Ebersberg
20. Eichstätt
21. Erding
22. Erlangen-Höchstadt
23. Forchheim
24. Freising
25. Freyung-Grafenau
26. Fürstenfeldbruck
27. Fürth
28. Garmisch-Partenkirchen
29. Günzburg
30. Hassberge
31. Hof
32. Kelheim
33. Kitzingen
34. Kronach
35. Kulmbach
36. Landsberg
37. Landshut
38. Lichtenfels
39. Lindau
40. Main-Spessart
41. Miesbach
42. Miltenberg
43. Mühldorf
44. München (Landkreis München)
45. Neuburg-Schrobenhausen
46. Neumarkt
47. Neustadt (Aisch)-Bad Windsheim
48. Neustadt an der Waldnaab
49. Neu-Ulm
50. Nürnberger Land
51. Oberallgäu
52. Ostallgäu
53. Passau
54. Pfaffenhofen
55. Regen
56. Regensburg
57. Rhön-Grabfeld
58. Rosenheim
59. Roth
60. Rottal-Inn
61. Schwandorf
62. Schweinfurt
63. Starnberg
64. Straubing-Bogen
65. Tirschenreuth
66. Traunstein
67. Unterallgäu
68. Weilheim-Schongau
69. Weissenburg-Gunzenhausen
70. Wunsiedel
71. Würzburg

Independent cities:

1. Amberg
2. Ansbach
3. Aschaffenburg
4. Augsburg
5. Bamberg
6. Bayreuth
7. Coburg
8. Erlangen
9. Fürth
10. Hof
11. Ingolstadt
12. Kaufbeuren
13. Kempten
14. Landshut
15. Memmingen
16. Munich (München)
17. Nuremberg (Nürnberg)
18. Passau
19. Regensburg
20. Rosenheim
21. Schwabach
22. Schweinfurt
23. Straubing
24. Weiden
25. Würzburg

=== Municipalities ===
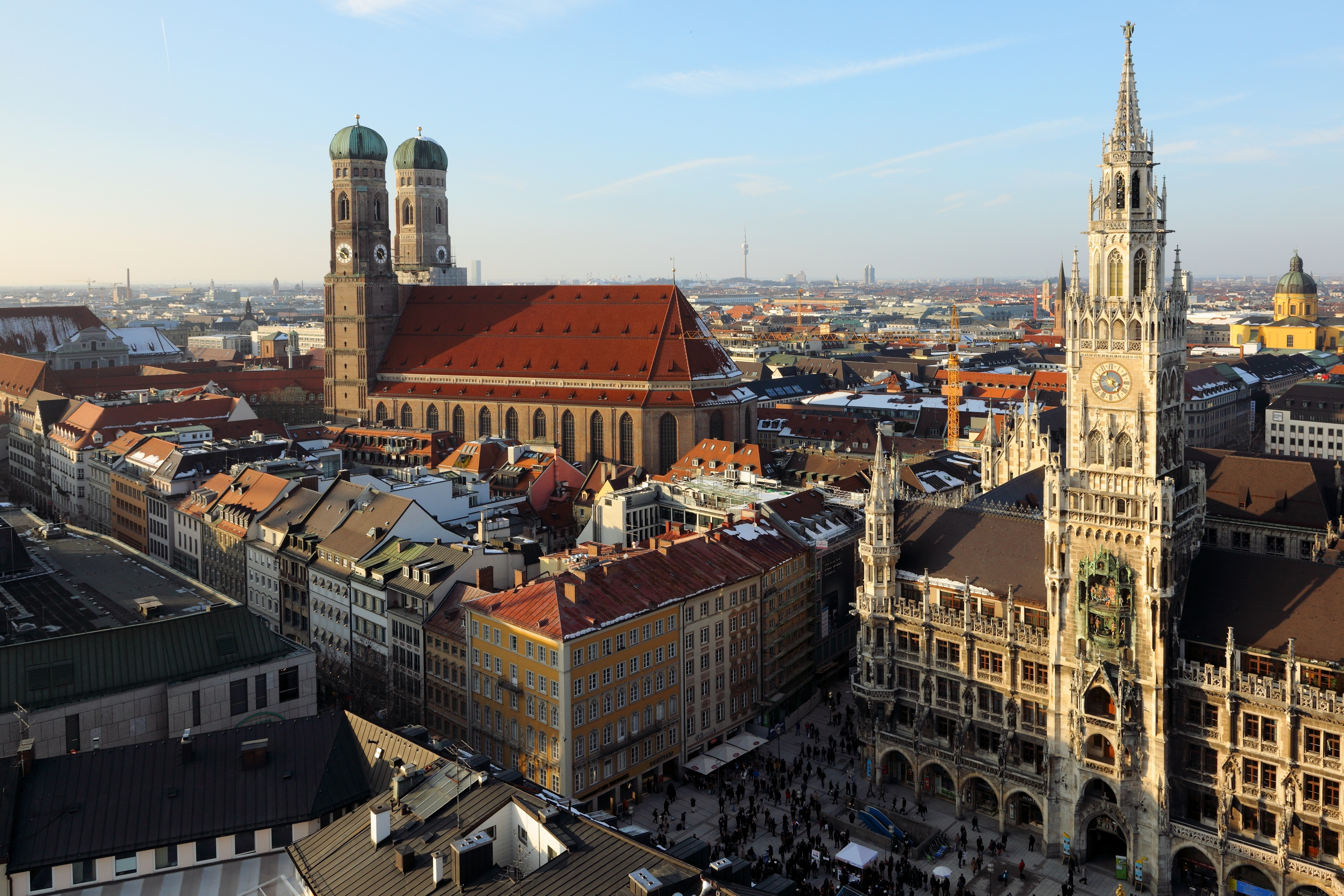
Munich with Frauenkirche (left) and Rathaus, Munich's town hall

The 71 rural districts are on the lowest level divided into 2,031 regular municipalities (called Gemeinden, singular Gemeinde). Together with the 25 independent cities (kreisfreie Städte, which are in effect municipalities independent of Landkreis administrations), there are a total of 2,056 municipalities in Bavaria.

In 44 of the 71 rural districts, there are a total of 215 unincorporated areas (as of 1 January 2005, called gemeindefreie Gebiete, singular gemeindefreies Gebiet), not belonging to any municipality, all uninhabited, mostly forested areas, but also four lakes (Chiemsee-without islands, Starnberger See-without island Roseninsel, Ammersee, which are the three largest lakes of Bavaria, and Waginger See).

==== Major cities and towns ====
City	Region	Inhabitants (2000)	Inhabitants (2005)	Inhabitants (2010)	Inhabitants (2015)	Change (%)
Munich	Upper Bavaria	1,210,223	1,259,677	1,353,186	1,450,381	+11.81
Nuremberg	Middle Franconia	488,400	499,237	505,664	509,975	+3.53
Augsburg	Swabia	254,982	262,676	264,708	286,374	+3.81
Regensburg	Upper Palatinate	125,676	129,859	135,520	145,465	+7.83
Ingolstadt	Upper Bavaria	115,722	121,314	125,088	132,438	+8.09
Würzburg	Lower Franconia	127,966	133,906	133,799	124,873	+4.56
Fürth	Middle Franconia	110,477	113,422	114,628	124,171	+3.76
Erlangen	Middle Franconia	100,778	103,197	105,629	108,336	+4.81
Bayreuth	Upper Franconia	74,153	73,997	72,683	72,148	−1.98
Bamberg	Upper Franconia	69,036	70,081	70,004	73,331	+1.40
Aschaffenburg	Lower Franconia	67,592	68,642	68,678	68,986	+1.61
Landshut	Lower Bavaria	58,746	61,368	63,258	69,211	+7.68
Kempten	Swabia	61,389	61,360	62,060	66,947	+1.09
Rosenheim	Upper Bavaria	58,908	60,226	61,299	61,844	+4.06
Neu-Ulm	Swabia	50,188	51,410	53,504	57,237	+6.61
Schweinfurt	Lower Franconia	54,325	54,273	53,415	51,969	−1.68
Passau	Lower Bavaria	50,536	50,651	50,594	50,566	+0.11
Freising	Upper Bavaria	40,890	42,854	45,223	46,963	+10.60
Straubing	Lower Bavaria	44,014	44,633	44,450	46,806	+0.99
Dachau	Upper Bavaria	38,398	39,922	42,954	46,705	+11.87
Source: Bayerisches Landesamt für Statistik und Datenverarbeitung

== Politics ==
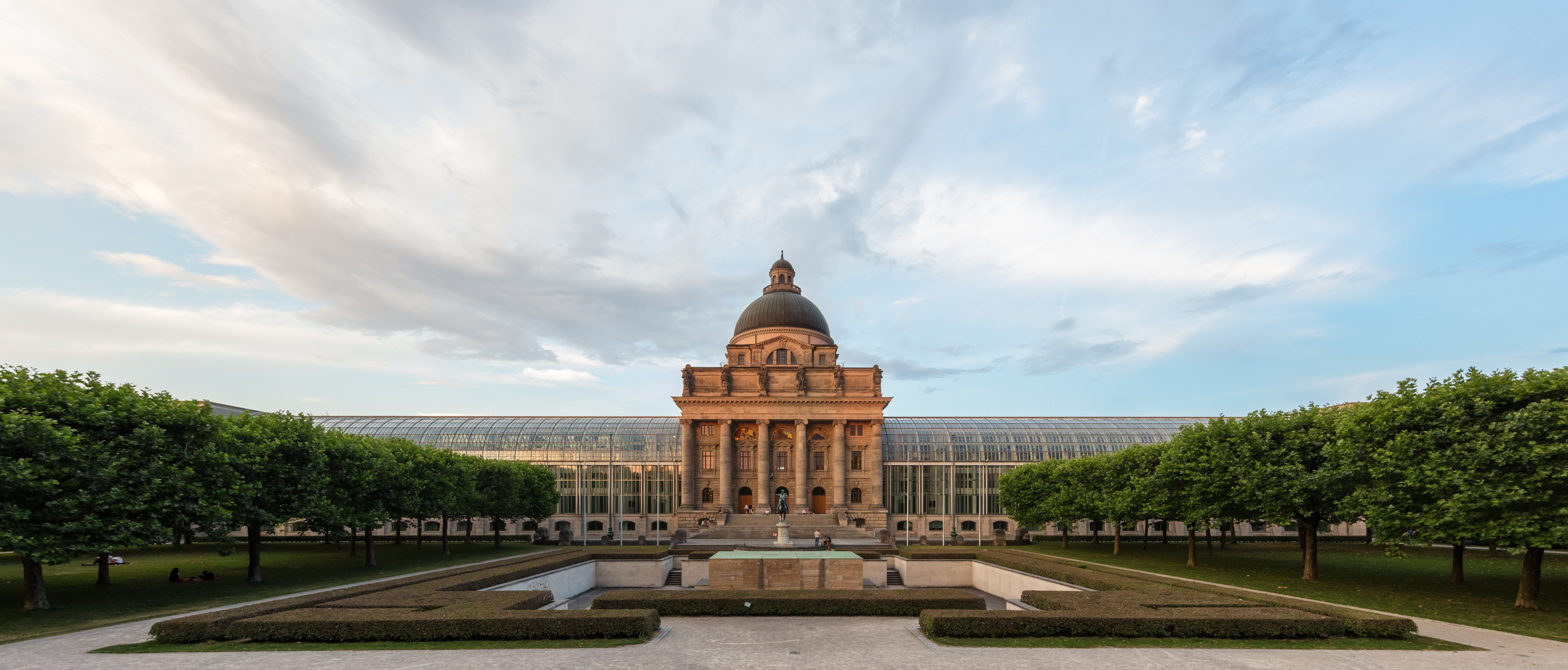
The Bavarian State Chancellery in Munich

Bavaria has a multiparty system dominated by the conservative Christian Social Union (CSU), which has won every election since 1945 with the exception of the 1950 ballot. Other important parties are the Free Voters, which became the second largest party in the 2023 Bavarian state election, The Greens, which became the second biggest political party in the 2018 Bavarian state elections, and the center-left Social Democrats (SPD), who had dominated the city of Munich until 2020. Hitherto, Wilhelm Hoegner has been the only SPD candidate to ever become Minister-President; notable successors in office include multi-term Federal Minister Franz Josef Strauss, a key figure among West German conservatives during the Cold War years, and Edmund Stoiber, who both failed with their bids for Chancellorship.

The German Greens and the center-right Free Voters have been represented in the state parliament since 1986 and 2008 respectively.

In the 2003 elections the CSU won a two-thirds supermajority – something no party had ever achieved in postwar Germany. However, in the subsequent 2008 elections the CSU lost the absolute majority for the first time in 46 years.

The losses were partly attributed by some to the CSU's stance for an anti-smoking bill. (A first anti-smoking law had been proposed by the CSU and passed but was watered down after the election, after which a referendum enforced a strict antismoking bill with a large majority).

=== Current Landtag ===
Current composition of the Landtag: SPD: 17 seats The Greens: 32 seats Free Voters: 37 seats CSU: 85 seats AfD: 32 seats

The last state elections were held on 8 October 2023. The CSU could almost maintain the results from the last elections with 37%. The Greens lost 3% compared to the last election with a result of 14.4%. The SPD lost again compared to the last election and was now at 8.4%. The liberals of the FDP were not able to reach the five-percent-threshold thus they are not part of the Landtag anymore, the second time after the 2013 elections. The right-wing populist Alternative for Germany (AfD) gained another 4% with 14.6% of the vote.

The center-right Free Voters party gained 15.8% of the votes and for the second time formed a government coalition with the CSU which led to the subsequent reelection of Markus Söder as Minister-President of Bavaria.

=== Government ===
The Constitution of Bavaria of the Free State of Bavaria was enacted on 8 December 1946. The new Bavarian Constitution became the basis for the Bavarian State after the Second World War.

Bavaria has a unicameral Landtag (English: State Parliament), elected by universal suffrage. Until December 1999, there was also a Senat, or Senate, whose members were chosen by social and economic groups in Bavaria, but following a referendum in 1998, this institution was abolished.

The Bavarian State Government consists of the Minister-President of Bavaria, eleven Ministers and six Secretaries of State. The Minister-President is elected for a period of five years by the State Parliament and is head of state. With the approval of the State Parliament he appoints the members of the State Government. The State Government is composed of the:

- State Chancellery (Staatskanzlei)
- Ministry of the Interior, for Sport and Integration (Staatsministerium des Innern, für Sport und Integration)
- Ministry for Housing, Construction and Transport (Staatsministerium für Wohnen, Bau und Verkehr)
- Ministry of Justice (Staatsministerium der Justiz)
- Ministry for Education and Culture (Staatsministerium für Bildung und Kultus)
- Ministry for Science and Art (Staatsministerium für Wissenschaft und Kunst)
- Ministry of Finance and for Home Affairs (Staatsministerium der Finanzen und für Heimat)
- Ministry for Economic Affairs, Regional Development and Energy (Staatsministerium für Wirtschaft, Landesentwicklung und Energie)
- Ministry for Environment and Consumer Protection (Staatsministerium für Umwelt und Verbraucherschutz)
- Ministry for Food, Agriculture and Forestry (Staatsministerium für Ernährung, Landwirtschaft und Forsten)
- Ministry for Family, Labour and Social Affairs (Staatsministerium für Familie, Arbeit und Soziales)
- Ministry for Health and Care (Staatsministerium für Gesundheit und Pflege)
- Ministry for Digital Affairs (Staatsministerium für Digitales)

Political processes also take place in the seven regions (Regierungsbezirke or Bezirke) in Bavaria, in the 71 rural districts (Landkreise) and the 25 towns and cities forming their own districts (kreisfreie Städte), and in the 2,031 local authorities (Gemeinden).

In 1995 Bavaria introduced direct democracy on the local level in a referendum. This was initiated bottom-up by an association called Mehr Demokratie (English: More Democracy). This is a grass-roots organization which campaigns for the right to citizen-initiated referendums. In 1997 the Bavarian Supreme Court tightened the regulations considerably (including by introducing a turn-out quorum). Nevertheless, Bavaria has the most advanced regulations on local direct democracy in Germany. This has led to a spirited citizens' participation in communal and municipal affairs—835 referendums took place from 1995 through 2005.

==== Minister-presidents of Bavaria since 1945 ====
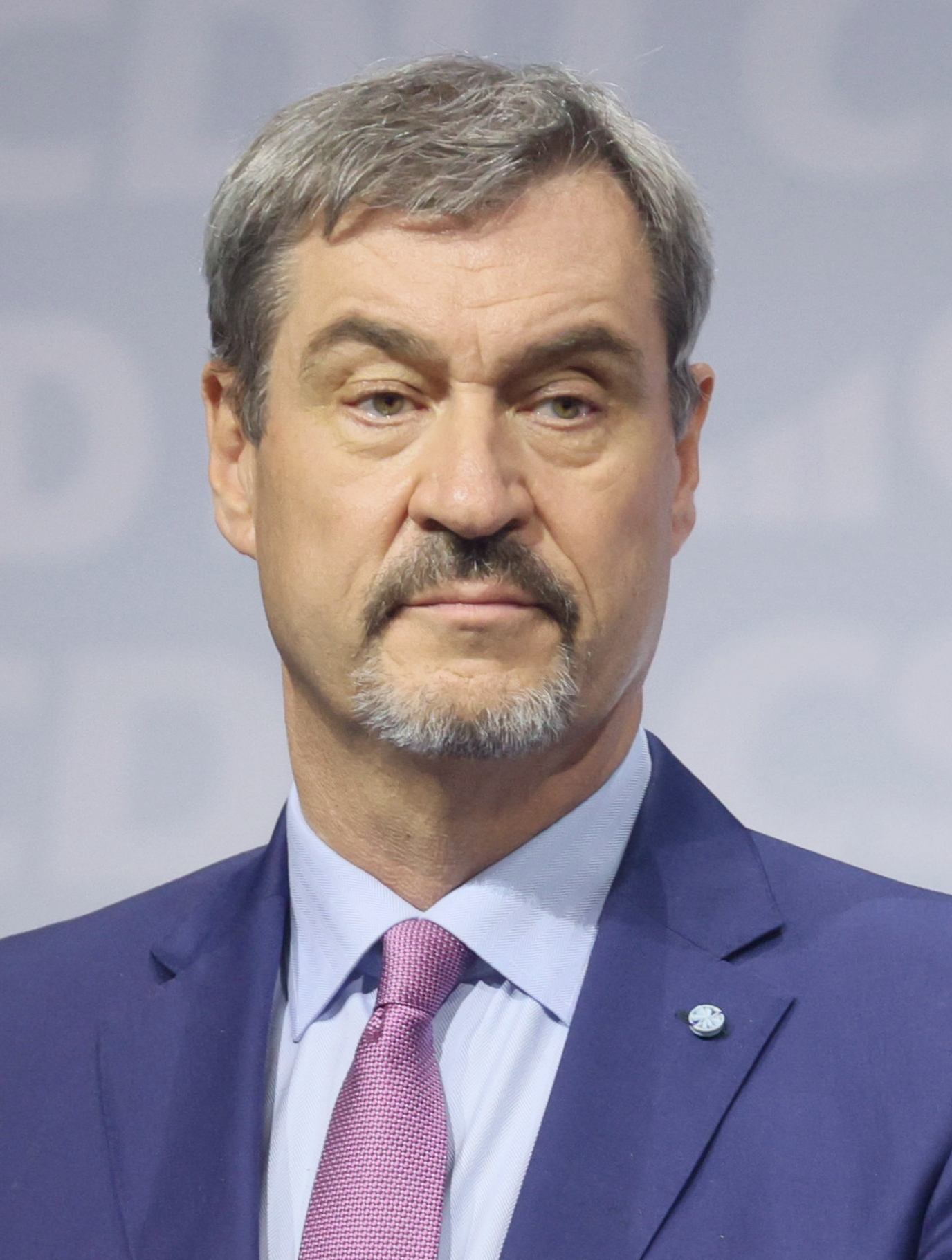
Markus Söder, the current prime minister of Bavaria

Minister-presidents of Bavaria
No.	Name	Born and died	Party affiliation	Begin of tenure	End of tenure
1	Fritz Schäffer	1888–1967	CSU	1945	1945
2	Wilhelm Hoegner	1887–1980	SPD	1945	1946
3	Hans Ehard	1887–1980	CSU	1946	1954
4	Wilhelm Hoegner	1887–1980	SPD	1954	1957
5	Hanns Seidel	1901–1961	CSU	1957	1960
6	Hans Ehard	1887–1980	CSU	1960	1962
7	Alfons Goppel	1905–1991	CSU	1962	1978
8	Franz Josef Strauß	1915–1988	CSU	1978	1988
9	Max Streibl	1932–1998	CSU	1988	1993
10	Edmund Stoiber	*1941	CSU	1993	2007
11	Günther Beckstein	*1943	CSU	2007	2008
12	Horst Seehofer	*1949	CSU	2008	2018
13	Markus Söder	*1967	CSU	2018	Incumbent

=== Designation as a "free state" ===
Unlike most German states (Länder), which simply designate themselves as "State of" (Land [...]), Bavaria uses the style of "Free State of Bavaria" (Freistaat Bayern). The difference from other states is purely terminological, as German constitutional law does not draw a distinction between "States" and "Free States". The situation is thus analogous to the United States, where some states use the style "Commonwealth" rather than "State". The term "Free State", a creation of the 19th century and intended to be a German alternative to (or translation of) the Latin-derived republic, was common among the states of the Weimar Republic, after German monarchies had been abolished. Unlike most other states – many of which were new creations – Bavaria has resumed this terminology after World War II. Two other states, Saxony and Thuringia, also call themselves "Free States".

=== Arbitrary arrest and human rights ===
In July 2017, Bavaria's parliament enacted a new revision of the "Gefährdergesetz", allowing the authorities to imprison a person for a three months term, renewable indefinitely, when they have not committed a crime but it is assumed that they might commit a crime "in the near future". Critics like the prominent journalist Heribert Prantl have called the law "shameful" and compared it to Guantanamo Bay detention camp, assessed it to be in violation of the European Convention on Human Rights, and also compared it to the legal situation in Russia, where a similar law allows for imprisonment for a maximum term of two years (i.e., not indefinitely).

== Economy ==
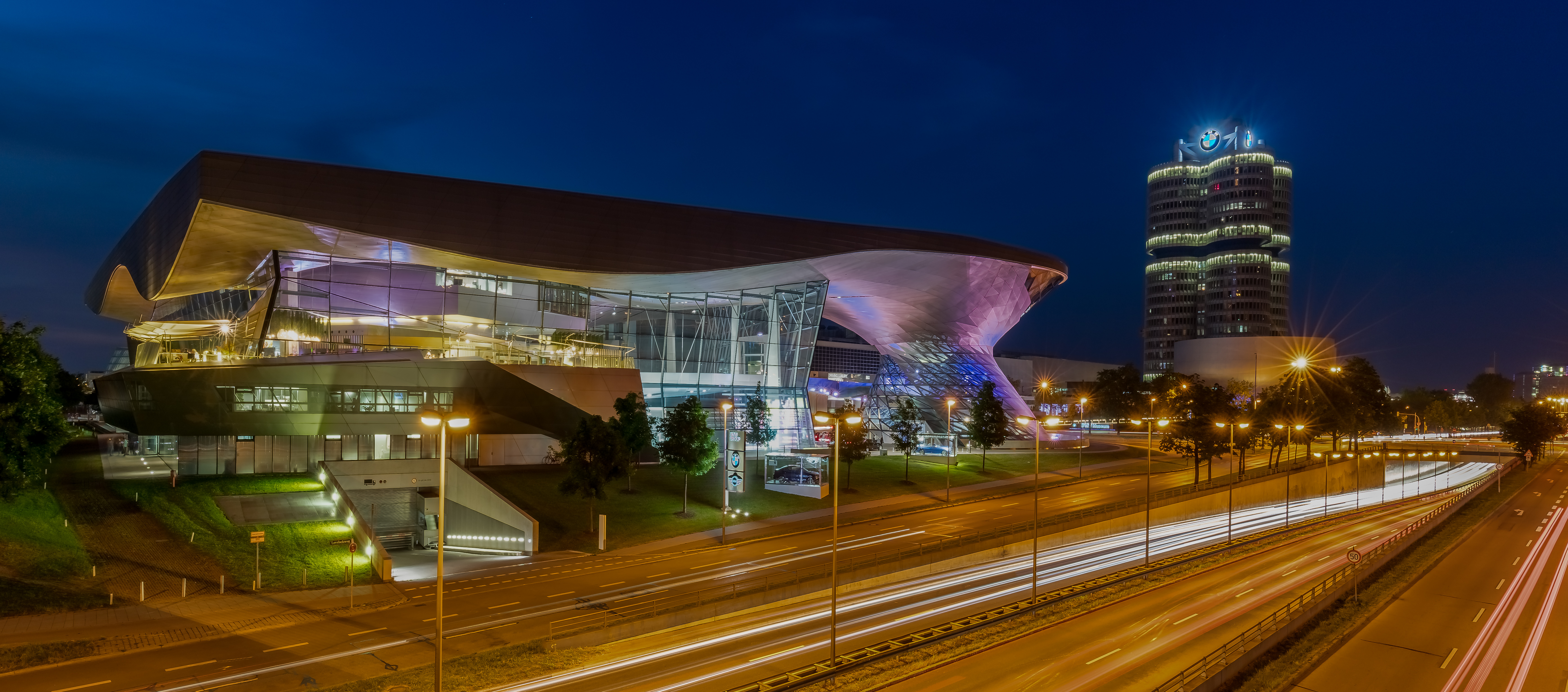
BMW Welt and BMW Headquarters in Munich

Bavaria has one of the largest economies in Germany and the European Union as a whole, with a GDP of €824.243 billion ($963.47 billion) in 2025, the second highest of the 16 German states behind only North Rhine-Westphalia, which had a GDP of €909.411 billion ($1.062 trillion) in 2025. Bavaria had a GDP per capita of €53,768 ($56,456) in 2022, the third highest in Germany behind Bremen (second) and Hamburg (first). One of Bavaria's largest and most developed industries is the automotive industry, with the state housing four BMW and two Audi manufacturing plants while also headquartering both companies. Bavaria has the second-most employees (207,829) in the automotive industry of all German states after Baden-Württemberg as of 2018. Other countries such as the Czech Republic, Austria, Switzerland and Italy have strong economic ties with Bavaria.

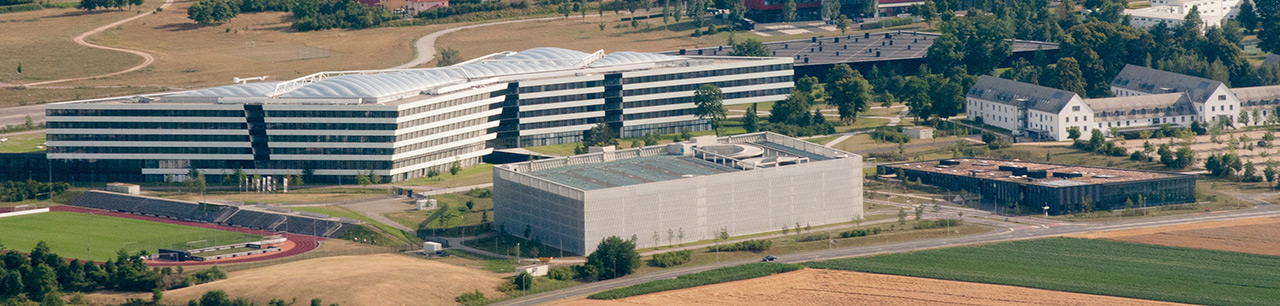
Adidas' headquarters in Herzogenaurach

Bavaria also is home to the headquarters of commercial vehicle manufacturer MAN and aircraft engine manufacturer MTU Aero Engines. Many other global companies such as Adidas, Siemens, and Allianz also have headquarters in Bavarian cities and towns. Several American companies have set up research and development facilities in Bavaria such as Apple, Google, IBM, Intel, Texas Instruments and Coherent. Despite being hundreds of miles from the sea, companies such as Bavaria Yachtbau produce sailing yachts and motorboats.

Bavaria is the most visited state in Germany, as over 38.86 million tourists visited Bavaria in 2023 alone, significantly higher than North Rhine-Westphalia's 23.58 million tourists. In 2019, tourism brought in a gross value of €28.1 billion ($28.918 billion), making up 4.9% of Bavaria's economy. Some significant tourist destinations include the Bavarian National Museum, Margravial Opera House, Deutsches Museum, Christmas markets in Nuremberg and Munich and the annually held Oktoberfest event, which made €1.2 billion ($1.236 billion) in 2018 alone.

The unemployment rate stood at 2.9% in October 2018, the lowest in Germany and one of the lowest in the European Union.

Year	2006	2007	2008	2009	2010	2011	2012	2013	2014	2015	2016	2017	2018	2019	2020	2021
Unemployment rate in %	6.8	5.3	4.2	4.8	4.5	3.8	3.7	3.8	3.8	3.6	3.5	3.2	2.9	2.8	3.6	3.5

== Demographics ==
Population density of Germany with Bavaria in the southeast

Bavaria has a population of approximately 13.1 million inhabitants (2020). Eight of the 80 largest cities in Germany are located within Bavaria with Munich being the largest (1,484,226 inhabitants, approximately 6.1 million when including the broader metropolitan area), followed by Nuremberg (518,370 inhabitants, approximately 3.6 million when including the broader metropolitan area), Augsburg (296,582 inhabitants) and Regensburg (153,094 inhabitants). All other cities in Bavaria had less than 150,000 inhabitants each in 2020. Population density in Bavaria was 186/km^{2} (480/sq mi), below the national average of 233/km^{2} (600/sq mi). Foreign nationals resident in Bavaria (both immigrants and refugees/asylum seekers) were principally from other EU countries, Turkey, and Syria.

Top-ten foreign resident populations
	Nationality	Population (31 December 2022)	Population (31 December 2023)
1	Romania	209,810	213,770
2	Turkey	194,730	204,260
3	Ukraine	178,925	181,880
4	Croatia	133,090	133,425
5	Poland	119,320	120,100
6	Italy	107,930	108,230
7	Syria	85,445	92,405
8	Austria	90,050	84,210
9	Hungary	76,705	79,365
10	Greece	78,875	76,155

Population development of Bavaria

=== Total population ===
Census	Population	per km²
1840	3,802,515	54
1871	4,292,484	61
1900	5,414,831	77
1925	6,451,380	91
1939	7,084,086	100
1950	9,184,466	130
1961	9,515,479	135
1970	10,479,386	149
1987	10,902,643	155
2011	12,397,614	176
2022	13,038,724	188

=== Vital statistics since 1900 ===
Year	Average population	Births	Deaths	Natural change	Crude birth rate (per 1000)	Crude death rate (per 1000)	Natural change (per 1000)	Total Fertility Rate
1900	6,147,000	226,213	156,408	69,805	36.8	25.4	11.4	
1901	6,222,000	231,476	143,374	88,102	37.2	23.0	14.2	
1902	6,315,000	232,382	142,622	89,760	36.8	22.6	14.2	
1903	6,381,000	225,249	148,465	76,784	35.3	23.3	12.0	
1904	6,455,000	230,443	145,177	85,266	35.7	22.5	13.2	
1905	6,520,000	225,584	147,310	78,274	34.6	22.6	12.0	
1906	6,575,000	226,854	139,081	87,773	34.5	21.2	13.3	
1907	6,643,000	223,856	138,696	85,160	33.7	20.9	12.8	
1908	6,725,000	225,950	139,732	86,218	33.6	20.8	12.8	
1909	6,799,000	220,961	136,960	84,001	32.5	20.1	12.4	
1910	6,843,000	215,540	130,858	84,682	31.5	19.1	12.4	
1911	6,935,000	209,443	135,787	73,656	30.2	19.6	10.6	
1912	6,982,000	208,776	123,253	85,523	29.9	17.7	12.2	
1913	7,064,000	202,024	120,703	81,321	28.6	17.1	11.5	
1914	7,119,000	199,344	152,860	46,484	28.0	21.5	6.5	
1915	7,123,000	151,722	153,355	-1,633	21.3	21.5	-0.2	
1916	7,125,000	113,294	154,381	-41,087	15.9	21.7	-5.8	
1917	7,060,000	109,426	144,157	-34,731	15.5	20.4	-4.9	
1918	7,020,000	111,625	174,633	-63,008	15.9	24.9	-9.0	
1919	7,110,000	154,287	114,686	39,601	21.7	16.1	5.6	
1920	7,179,000	198,857	112,090	86,767	27.7	15.6	12.1	
1921	7,243,000	195,548	113,743	81,805	27.0	15.7	11.3	
1922	7,313,000	182,828	112,268	70,560	25.0	15.4	9.6	
1923	7,392,000	172,978	111,561	61,417	23.4	15.1	8.3	
1924	7,440,000	167,400	99,958	67,442	22.5	13.4	9.1	
1925	7,370,000	167,305	99,472	67,833	22.7	13.5	9.2	
1926	7,451,000	160,200	96,440	63,760	21.5	12.9	8.6	
1927	7,464,000	150,782	96,989	53,793	20.2	13.0	7.2	
1928	7,459,000	153,649	94,620	59,029	20.6	12.7	7.9	
1929	7,491,000	149,816	100,240	49,576	20.0	13.4	6.6	
1930	7,564,000	149,008	92,221	56,787	19.7	12.2	7.5	
1931	7,608,000	136,943	93,383	43,560	18.0	12.3	5.7	
1932	7,680,000	132,857	90,333	42,524	17.3	11.8	5.5	
1933	7,691,000	127,676	90,684	36,992	16.6	11.8	4.8	
1934	7,718,000	146,637	89,036	57,601	19.0	11.5	7.5	
1935	7,783,000	154,890	99,968	54,922	19.9	12.8	7.1	
1936	7,842,000	158,402	98,960	59,442	20.2	12.6	7.6	
1937	7,910,000	157,405	97,889	59,516	19.9	12.4	7.5	
1938	7,981,000	168,391	98,513	69,878	21.1	12.3	8.8	
1939	8,255,000	179,129	105,834	73,295	21.7	12.8	8.9	
1940	8,301,000	174,311	104,702	69,609	21.0	12.6	8.4	
1941	8,313,000	157,946	103,372	54,574	19.0	12.4	6.6	
1942		124,344	105,600	18,744				
1943		137,112	125,868	11,244				
1944								
1945		115,793	152,977	-37,184				
1946	8,839,000	156,302	109,707	46,595	17.7	12.4	5.3	
1947	9,010,000	169,829	109,004	60,825	18.8	12.1	6.8	
1948	9,169,000	162,571	102,130	60,441	17.7	11.1	6.6	
1949	9,184,000	156,253	99,473	56,780	17.0	10.8	6.2	
1950	9,177,242	151,752	98,973	52,779	16.5	10.8	5.8	
1951	9,179,190	147,127	99,650	47,477	16.0	10.9	5.2	
1952	9,175,388	146,991	101,331	45,660	16.0	11.0	5.0	
1953	9,161,966	143,618	105,507	38,111	15.7	11.5	4.2	
1954	9,158,270	144,783	97,870	46,913	15.8	10.7	5.1	
1955	9,176,637	145,122	103,376	41,746	15.8	11.3	4.5	
1956	9,125,258	152,876	103,778	49,098	16.8	11.4	5.4	
1957	9,192,827	158,839	108,041	50,798	17.3	11.8	5.5	
1958	9,278,029	161,443	101,910	59,533	17.4	11.0	6.4	
1959	9,370,992	168,150	103,550	64,600	17.9	11.0	6.9	
1960	9,494,939	171,665	109,786	61,879	18.1	11.6	6.5	2.45
1961	9,593,770	180,000	106,363	73,637	18.8	11.1	7.7	2.57
1962	9,731,231	180,224	109,282	70,942	18.5	11.2	7.3	2.54
1963	9,846,637	184,674	111,973	72,701	18.8	11.4	7.4	2.59
1964	9,976,153	185,326	108,816	76,510	18.6	10.9	7.7	2.59
1965	10,100,944	180,739	114,386	66,353	17.9	11.3	6.6	2.54
1966	10,216,769	181,559	113,779	67,780	17.8	11.1	6.6	2.55
1967	10,280,351	176,362	116,529	59,833	17.2	11.3	5.8	2.49
1968	10,405,639	168,403	122,311	46,092	16.2	11.5	4.7	2.37
1969	10,568,917	158,394	126,448	31,946	15.0	12.0	3.0	2.22
1970	10,561,110	143,656	122,323	21,333	13.6	11.6	2.0	2.03
1971	10,690,951	137,465	121,803	15,662	12.9	11.4	1.5	1.92
1972	10,778,661	125,110	122,766	2,344	11.6	11.4	0.2	1.73
1973	10,852,761	114,658	123,656	-8,998	10.6	11.4	-0.8	1.57
1974	10,849,122	114,060	123,980	-9,920	10.5	11.4	-0.9	1.54
1975	10,810,389	108,544	127,931	-19,387	10.0	11.8	-1.8	1.47
1976	10,804,236	108,995	124,580	-15,585	10.1	11.5	-1.4	1.47
1977	10,819,318	106,633	120,487	-13,854	9.9	11.6	-1.7	1.43
1978	10,831,371	106,145	124,775	-18,630	9.8	11.5	-1.7	1.42
1979	10,870,968	107,667	122,271	-14,604	9.9	11.2	-1.3	1.42
1980	10,928,151	114,451	122,859	-8,408	10.5	11.2	-0.8	1.48
1981	10,959,203	117,063	123,736	-6,673	10.7	11.3	-0.6	1.49
1982	10,966,717	116,576	123,033	-6,457	10.6	11.2	-0.6	1.46
1983	10,969,503	112,644	125,362	-12,718	10.3	11.4	-1.2	1.39
1984	10,957,544	111,183	122,057	-10,874	10.1	11.1	-1.0	1.35
1985	10,973,720	111,365	121,941	-10,576	10.2	11.1	-1.0	1.34
1986	11,026,490	118,439	120,489	-2,050	10.7	10.9	-0.2	1.39
1987	10,949,700	119,623	119,662	-39	10.9	10.9	-0.0	1.42
1988	11,049,263	126,409	118,450	7,959	11.4	10.7	0.7	1.45
1989	11,220,735	127,029	121,343	5,686	11.3	10.8	0.5	1.43
1990	11,448,823	136,122	123,726	12,396	11.9	10.8	1.1	1.49
1991	11,595,970	134,400	122,276	12,124	11.6	10.5	1.0	1.45
1992	11,770,257	133,946	120,753	13,193	11.4	10.3	1.1	1.42
1993	11,863,313	133,897	122,649	11,248	11.3	10.3	0.9	1.42
1994	11,921,944	127,828	121,581	6,247	10.7	10.2	0.5	1.36
1995	11,993,484	125,995	121,992	4,003	10.5	10.2	0.3	1.35
1996	12,043,869	129,376	123,329	6,047	10.7	10.2	0.5	1.40
1997	12,066,375	130,517	121,441	9,076	10.8	10.1	0.8	1.44
1998	12,086,548	126,529	120,447	6,082	10.5	10.0	0.5	1.43
1999	12,154,967	123,244	119,519	3,725	10.1	9.8	0.3	1.42
2000	12,230,255	120,765	118,846	1,919	9.9	9.7	0.2	1.41
2001	12,329,714	115,964	117,930	-1,966	9.4	9.6	-0.2	1.37
2002	12,387,351	113,818	119,755	-5,937	9.2	9.7	-0.5	1.36
2003	12,423,386	111,536	121,778	-10,242	9.0	9.8	-0.8	1.35
2004	12,443,893	111,164	116,460	-5,296	8.9	9.4	-0.4	1.37
2005	12,468,726	107,308	119,326	-12,018	8.6	9.6	-1.0	1.34
2006	12,492,658	104,822	118,733	-13,911	8.4	9.5	-1.1	1.32
2007	12,520,332	106,870	118,432	-11,562	8.5	9.5	-0.9	1.36
2008	12,519,728	106,298	121,109	-14,811	8.5	9.7	-1.2	1.36
2009	12,510,331	103,710	122,494	-18,784	8.3	9.8	-1.5	1.34
2010	12,538,696	105,251	123,089	-17,838	8.4	9.8	-1.4	1.36
2011	12,443,372	103,668	122,955	-19,287	8.3	9.9	-1.5	1.36
2012	12,519,571	107,039	125,448	-18,409	8.5	10.0	-1.5	1.39
2013	12,604,244	109,562	126,903	-17,341	8.7	10.1	-1.4	1.41
2014	12,691,568	113,935	124,129	-10,194	9.0	9.8	-0.8	1.45
2015	12,843,514	118,228	133,536	-15,308	9.2	10.4	-1.2	1.48
2016	12,930,751	125,686	129,552	-3,866	9.7	10.0	-0.3	1.56
2017	12,997,204	126,187	133,902	-7,715	9.7	10.3	-0.6	1.55
2018	13,076,721	127,616	134,809	-7,193	9.8	10.3	-0.5	1.55
2019	13,124,737	128,227	134,313	-6,086	9.8	10.2	-0.5	1.55
2020	13,140,183	128,764	143,367	-14,603	9.8	10.9	-1.1	1.55
2021	13,176,989	134,321	147,984	-13,663	10.2	11.2	-1.0	1.61
2022	13,369,393	124,897	152,417	-27,520	9.3	11.4	-2.1	1.53
2023	13,435,062	116,505	146,475	-29,970	8.7	10.9	-2.2	1.42
2024	13,497,564	114,365	144,061	-29,696	8.5	10.7	-2.2	1.39
2025	13,494,139	110,564	144,069	-33,505	8.2	10.7	-2.5	1.34

Current vital statistics
Comparison period	Births	Deaths	Natural growth
January – June 2025	▼53,953	▲74,787	▲−20,834
January – June 2026	▼53,336	▼72,746	▲ −19,410

== Culture ==
Some features of the Bavarian culture and mentality are remarkably distinct from the rest of Germany. Noteworthy differences (especially in rural areas, less significant in the major cities) can be found with respect to religion, traditions, and language.

=== Religion ===
Religion in Bavaria – 2025
Religion	Percent
None or other	44.4%
Roman Catholics	40.7%
Protestants (ELKB)	14.9%

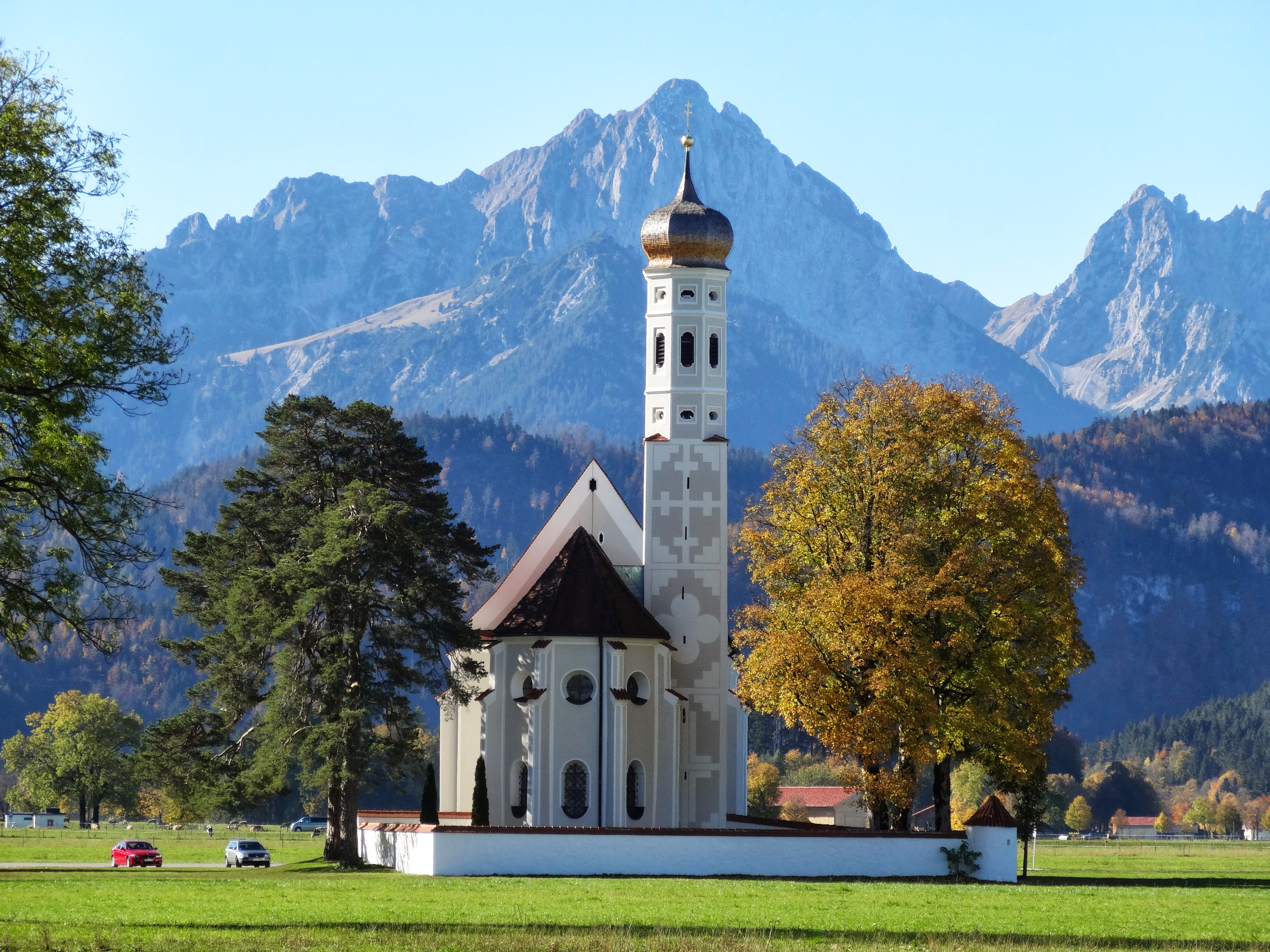
A Catholic Church near Füssen with the Alps in the background

Bavarian culture (Altbayern) has a long and predominant tradition of Roman Catholic faith. Pope Benedict XVI (Joseph Alois Ratzinger) was born in Marktl am Inn in Upper Bavaria and was Cardinal-Archbishop of Munich and Freising. Otherwise, the culturally Franconian and Swabian regions of the modern State of Bavaria are historically more diverse in religiosity, with both Catholic and Protestant traditions. In 1925, 70.0% of the Bavarian population was Catholic, 28.8% was Protestant, 0.7% was Jewish, and 0.5% was placed in other religious categories.

As of 2025, 44.4% of the population was not religious or adhered to religions other than the Evangelical Church or Catholicism. 40.7% of Bavarians adhered to Catholicism (a decline from 70.4% in 1970). 14.9 percent of the population adheres to the Evangelical Lutheran Church in Bavaria, which has also declined since 1970.

3.0% was Orthodox and Muslims make up 4.0% of the population of Bavaria.

=== Traditions ===
Bavarians commonly emphasize pride in their traditions. Traditional costumes collectively known as Tracht are worn on special occasions and include in Altbayern Lederhosen for males and Dirndl for females. Centuries-old folk music is performed. The Maibaum, or Maypole (which in the Middle Ages served as the community's business directory, as figures on the pole represented the trades of the village), and the bagpipes of the Upper Palatinate region bear witness to the ancient Celtic and Germanic remnants of cultural heritage of the region. There are many traditional Bavarian sports disciplines, e.g. the Aperschnalzen, competitive whipcracking.

Whether in Bavaria, overseas or with citizens from other nations Bavarians continue to cultivate their traditions. They hold festivals and dances to keep their heritage alive.

=== Food and drink ===
Bavarians tend to place a great value on food and drink. In addition to their renowned dishes, Bavarians also consume many items of food and drink which are unusual elsewhere in Germany; for example Weißwurst ("white sausage") or in some instances a variety of entrails.

More than 285 typical Bavarian products have been recorded in the Bavarian specialities database 'GenussBayern' since the 1990s. Recipes and museums can also be found there. With a total of 54 specialities protected under European law, Bavaria is the no. 1 speciality region in Germany. Bavarian products such as 'Bavarian beer', 'Nuremberg bratwurst', 'Allgäu mountain cheese' and 'Schrobenhausen asparagus' are just as much a part of the official EU list 'eAmbrosia' of prestigious regional culinary specialities as the protected names "Champagne" and 'Prosciutto di Parma'. Bavarian specialities, which are protected as geographical indications, are deeply rooted in their region of origin, important anchors of local identity and also tourist flagships – they are therefore at the heart of Bavarian cuisine.

Restaurants that carry the 'Ausgezeichnete GenussKüche' award (recognizable by a sign near the door) are known by locals for their certified, authentic Bavarian cuisine.

At folk festivals and in many beer gardens, beer is traditionally served by the litre (in a Maß). Bavarians are particularly proud of the traditional Reinheitsgebot, or beer purity law, initially established by the Duke of Bavaria for the City of Munich (i.e. the court) in 1487 and the duchy in 1516. According to this law, only three ingredients were allowed in beer: water, barley, and hops. In 1906 the Reinheitsgebot made its way to all-German law, and remained a law in Germany until the EU partly struck it down in 1987 as incompatible with the European common market. German breweries, however, cling to the principle, and Bavarian breweries still comply with it in order to distinguish their beer brands. Bavarians are also known as some of the world's most prolific beer drinkers, with an average annual consumption of 130–135 liters per capita, as of 2018.

Bavaria is also home to the Franconia wine region, which is situated along the river Main in Franconia. The region has produced wine (Frankenwein) for over 1,000 years and is famous for its use of the Bocksbeutel wine bottle. The production of wine forms an integral part of the regional culture, and many of its villages and cities hold their own wine festivals (Weinfeste) throughout the year.

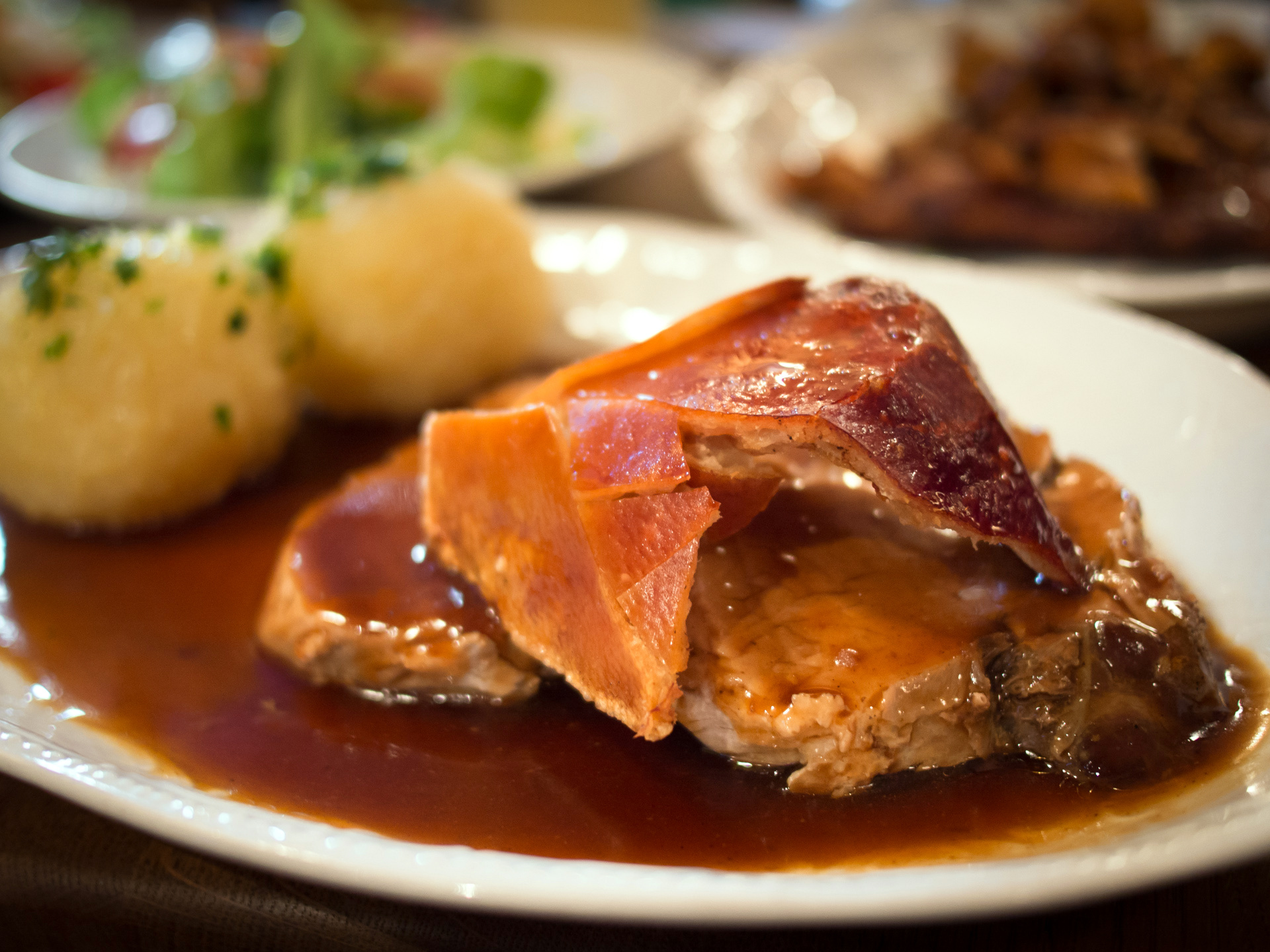
Schweinsbraten

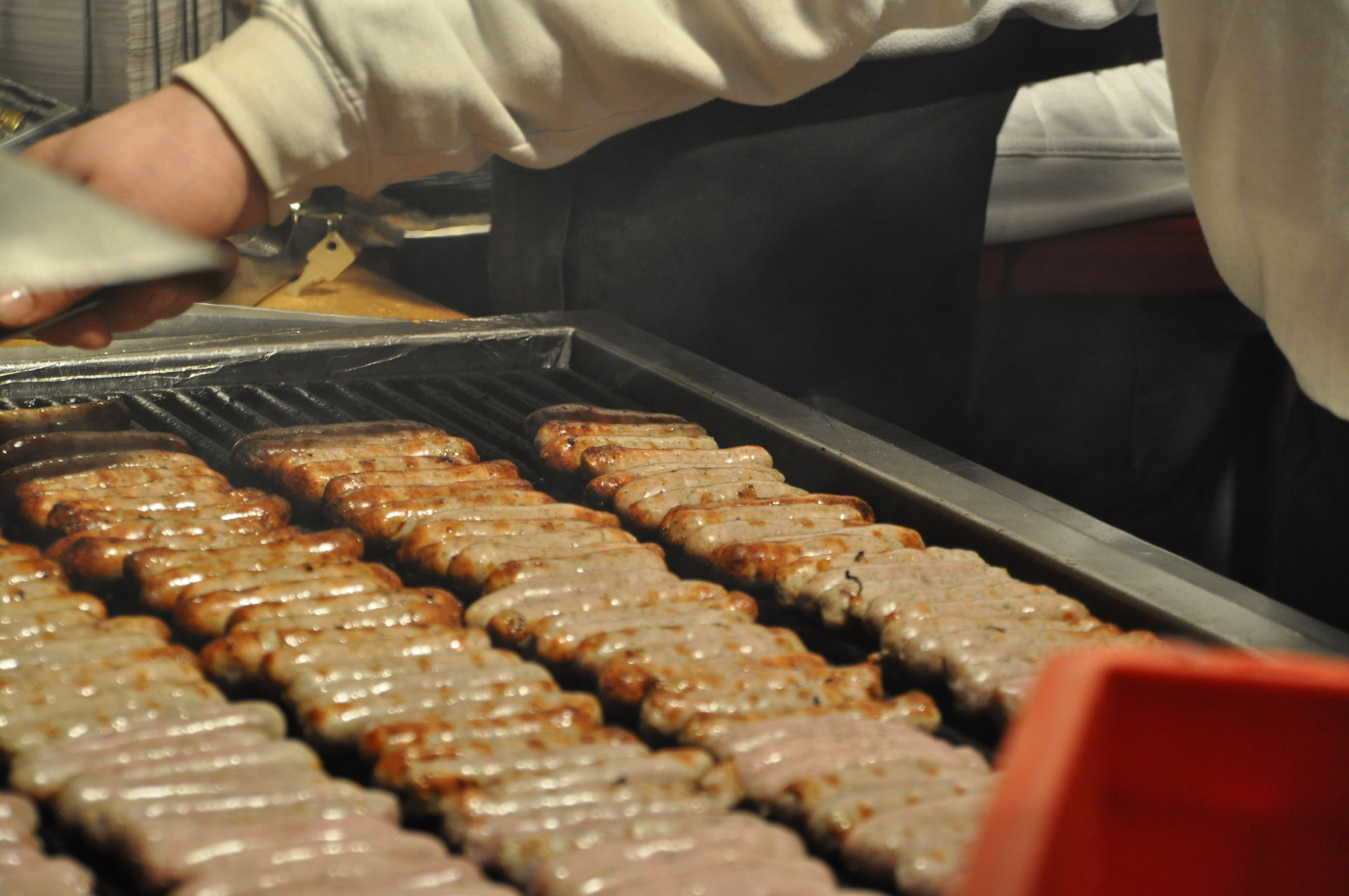
Nürnberger Rostbratwürste

=== Language and dialects ===
A native Bavarian language speaker recorded in Germany

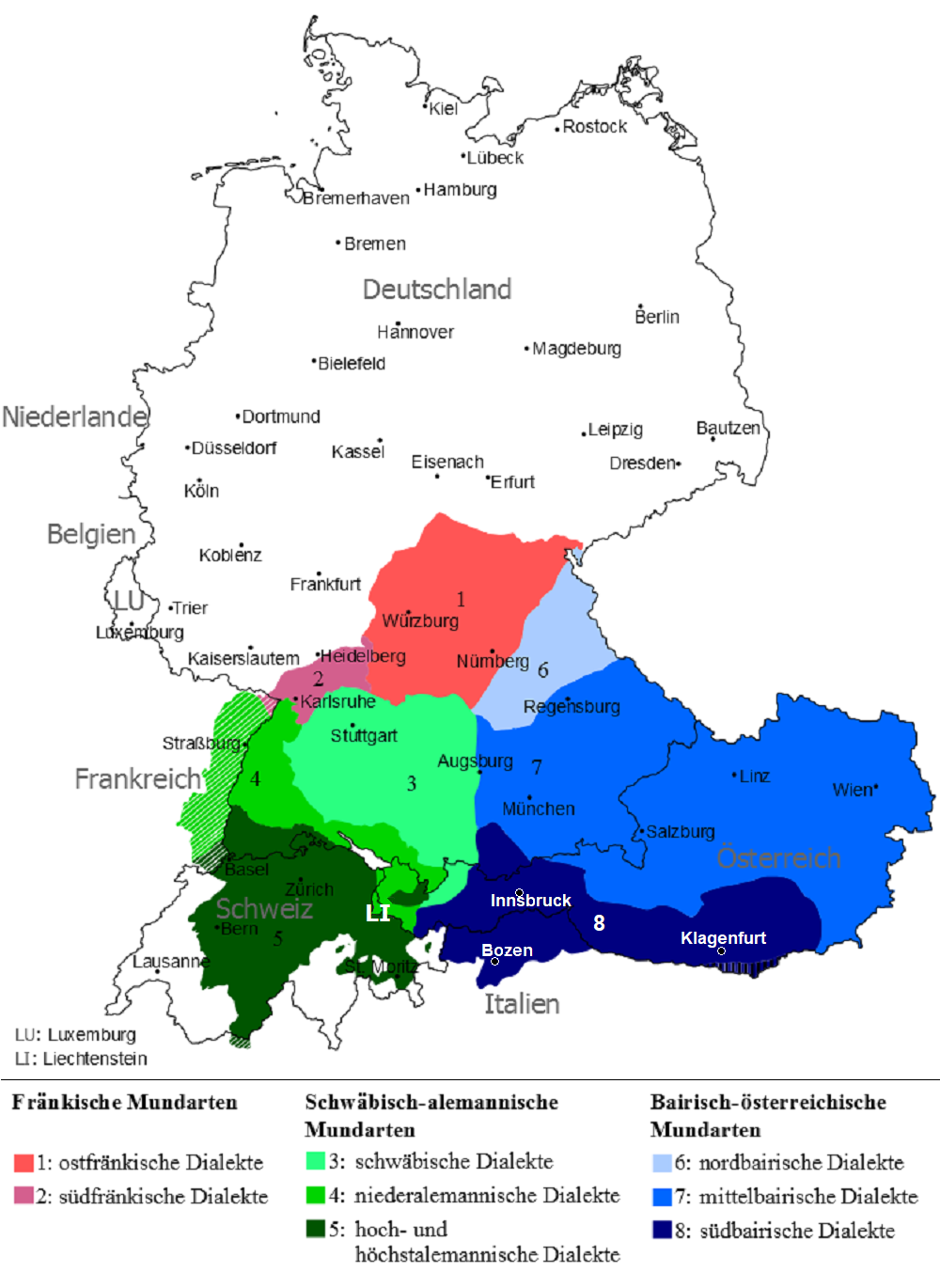
Upper German and Central German form the German language; Austro-Bavarian dialects are highlighted in blue.

Three German dialects are most commonly spoken in Bavaria: Austro-Bavarian in Old Bavaria (Upper Bavaria, Lower Bavaria, and the Upper Palatinate), Swabian German (an Alemannic German dialect) in the Bavarian part of Swabia (southwest) and East Franconian German in Franconia (north). In the small town Ludwigsstadt in the north, district Kronach in Upper Franconia, Thuringian dialect is spoken. During the 20th century an increasing part of the population began to speak Standard German (Hochdeutsch), mainly in the cities.

=== Ethnography ===
Bavarians consider themselves to be egalitarian and informal. Their sociability can be experienced at the annual Oktoberfest, the world's largest beer festival, which welcomes around six million visitors every year, or in the famous beer gardens. In traditional Bavarian beer gardens, patrons may bring their own food but buy beer only from the brewery that runs the beer garden.

=== Museums ===
There are around 1,300 museums in Bavaria, including museums of art and cultural history, castles and palaces, archaeological and natural history collections, museums of technological and industrial history, and farm and open-air museums. The history of Bavarian museums dates back to manorial cabinets of curiosities and treasuries. The art holdings of the House of Wittelsbach thus formed the first and essential foundation of later state museums. As early as the mid-16th century, Duke Albrecht V (r. 1550–1579) had collected paintings as well as Greek and Roman sculptures (or copies made of them). He had the Antiquarium in the Munich Residence built specifically for his collection of antique sculptures. The electors Maximilian I (r. 1594–1651) and Max II. Emanuel (r. 1679–1726) expanded the art collections considerably. In the Age of Enlightenment at the end of the 18th century, there was a demand to open up art collections to the general public in the spirit of "popular education". But Museums were not founded by the state until the time of the art-loving King Ludwig I (r. 1825–1848). In Munich, he built Glyptothek (opened 1830), Alte Pinakothek (opened 1836), and Neue Pinakothek (opened 1853). Also, the foundation of the Germanisches Nationalmuseum in Nuremberg (1852), the establishment of the Neue Pinakothek, which opened in 1853, and the Bavarian National Museum (1867) in Munich were of central importance for the development of museums in Bavaria in the 19th century. With the end of the monarchy in 1918, many castles and formerly Wittelsbach property passed to the young Free State. In particular, the castles of king Ludwig II (r. 1864–1886) Neuschwanstein, Linderhof and Herrenchiemsee, quickly became magnets for the public. Since then, the number of Bavarian Museums has grown considerably, from 125 in 1907 to around 1,300 today.

== Transport ==
=== Air ===
Bavaria's main airport is Munich Airport which is also Germany's second-busiest airport after Frankfurt Airport and the eleventh-busiest in Europe, handling 41.6 million passengers in 2024. The airport had been ranked as the 39th-busiest airport worldwide that year.

Other airports serving the region include Nuremberg Airport which is the second busiest in Bavaria, and Memmingen Airport, also known as Allgäu Airport.

== Sports ==
=== Football ===
Bavaria is home to several football club(s) including FC Bayern Munich, 1. FC Nürnberg, FC Augsburg, TSV 1860 Munich, SSV Jahn Regensburg, FC Ingolstadt 04 and SpVgg Greuther Fürth. Bayern Munich is the most successful football team in Germany having won a record 35 German titles and 6 UEFA Champions League titles. They are followed by 1. FC Nürnberg who have won 9 titles. SpVgg Greuther Fürth have won 3 championships while TSV 1860 Munich have been champions once.

=== Basketball ===
Bavaria is also home to four professional basketball teams, including FC Bayern Munich, Brose Baskets Bamberg, s.Oliver Würzburg, Nürnberg Falcons BC, and TSV Oberhaching Tropics.

=== Ice hockey ===
There are five Bavarian ice hockey teams playing in the German top-tier league DEL: EHC Red Bull München, Nürnberg Ice Tigers, Augsburger Panther, ERC Ingolstadt, and Straubing Tigers.

== Notable people ==
Notable people who have lived, or live currently, in Bavaria include:

- Kings: Arnulf of Carinthia, Carloman of Bavaria, Charles the Fat, Lothair I, Louis the Child, Louis the German, Louis the Younger, Ludwig I of Bavaria, Ludwig II of Bavaria, Ludwig III of Bavaria, Maximilian I Joseph of Bavaria, Maximilian II of Bavaria, Otto, King of Bavaria
- Religious leaders: Pope Benedict XVI (Joseph Aloisius Ratzinger); Pope Damasus II, Pope Victor II
- Painters: Albrecht Dürer, Albrecht Altdorfer, Joseph Karl Stieler, Carl Spitzweg, Erwin Eisch, Franz von Lenbach, Franz von Stuck, Franz Marc, Gabriele Münter, Hans Holbein the Elder, Johann Christian Reinhart, Lucas Cranach, Paul Klee
- Classical musicians: Orlando di Lasso, Christoph Willibald Gluck, Leopold Mozart, Max Reger, Richard Wagner, Richard Strauss, Carl Orff, Johann Pachelbel, Theobald Boehm, Klaus Nomi
- Other musicians: Hans-Jürgen Buchner, Barbara Dennerlein, Klaus Doldinger, Franzl Lang, Bands: Spider Murphy Gang, Sportfreunde Stiller, Obscura, Michael Bredl
- Opera singers: Jonas Kaufmann, Diana Damrau
- Writers, poets and playwrights: Hans Sachs, Jean Paul, Friedrich Rückert, August von Platen-Hallermünde, Frank Wedekind, Christian Morgenstern, Oskar Maria Graf, Bertolt Brecht, Lion Feuchtwanger, Thomas Mann, Klaus Mann, Golo Mann, Ludwig Thoma, Michael Ende, Ludwig Aurbacher, Emanuel Hecht
- Scientists: Max Planck, Wilhelm Conrad Röntgen, Werner Heisenberg, Adam Ries, Joseph von Fraunhofer, Georg Ohm, Johannes Stark, Carl von Linde, Ludwig Prandtl, Rudolf Mössbauer, Lothar Rohde, Hermann Schwarz, Robert Huber, Martin Behaim, Levi Strauss, Rudolf Diesel, Feodor Lynen, Georges J. F. Köhler, Erwin Neher, Ernst Otto Fischer, Johann Deisenhofer
- Physicians: Alois Alzheimer, Max Joseph von Pettenkofer, Sebastian Kneipp
- Politicians: Ludwig Erhard, Horst Seehofer, Christian Ude, Kurt Eisner, Franz-Josef Strauß, Roman Herzog, Leonard John Rose, Henry Kissinger
- Football players: Max Morlock, Karl Mai, Franz Beckenbauer, Sepp Maier, Gerd Müller, Paul Breitner, Bernd Schuster, Klaus Augenthaler, Lothar Matthäus, Philipp Lahm, Bastian Schweinsteiger, Holger Badstuber, Thomas Müller, Mario Götze, Dietmar Hamann, Stefan Reuter, Lennart Karl
- Other sportspeople: Bernhard Langer, Dirk Nowitzki, Phoenix Sanders
- Actors: Michael Herbig, Werner Stocker, Helmut Fischer, Walter Sedlmayr, Gustl Bayrhammer, Ottfried Fischer, Ruth Drexel, Elmar Wepper, Fritz Wepper, Uschi Glas, Yank Azman
- Entertainers: Siegfried Fischbacher, Thomas Gottschalk
- Film directors: Helmut Dietl, Rainer Werner Fassbinder, Bernd Eichinger, Joseph Vilsmaier, Hans Steinhoff, Werner Herzog
- Designers: Peter Schreyer, Damir Doma, Thomas Nast
- Entrepreneurs: Charles Diebold, Adi Dassler, Rudolf Dassler, Levi Strauss, Ed Meier
- Military: Claus von Stauffenberg, Franz Stigler
- Nazis: Sepp Dietrich, Karl Fiehler, Karl Gebhardt, Hermann Göring, Heinrich Himmler, Alfred Jodl, Josef Kollmer, Josef Mengele, Ernst Röhm, Franz Ritter von Epp, Julius Streicher
- Others: Kaspar Hauser, The Smith of Kochel, Mathias Kneißl, Matthias Klostermayr, Anneliese Michel, Herluka von Bernried

== See also ==
- Outline of Germany
- Former countries in Europe after 1815
- List of Bavaria-related topics
- List of minister-presidents of Bavaria
- List of rulers of Bavaria
