= Herluka von Bernried =

German laywoman (b. 1060, d. 1127)

Herluka von Bernried, also known as Herluka von Epfach, (1060 – 1127) was a German laywoman and supporter of Gregorian reform. The vast majority of what is known of Herluka can be attributed to the works of Paul von Bernried, a German priest and friend of Herluka's, in his Vita Herlucae (Life of Herluka, composed c. 1130/1) and in parts of his Vita Gregorii (Life of Gregory VII, composed c. 1128).

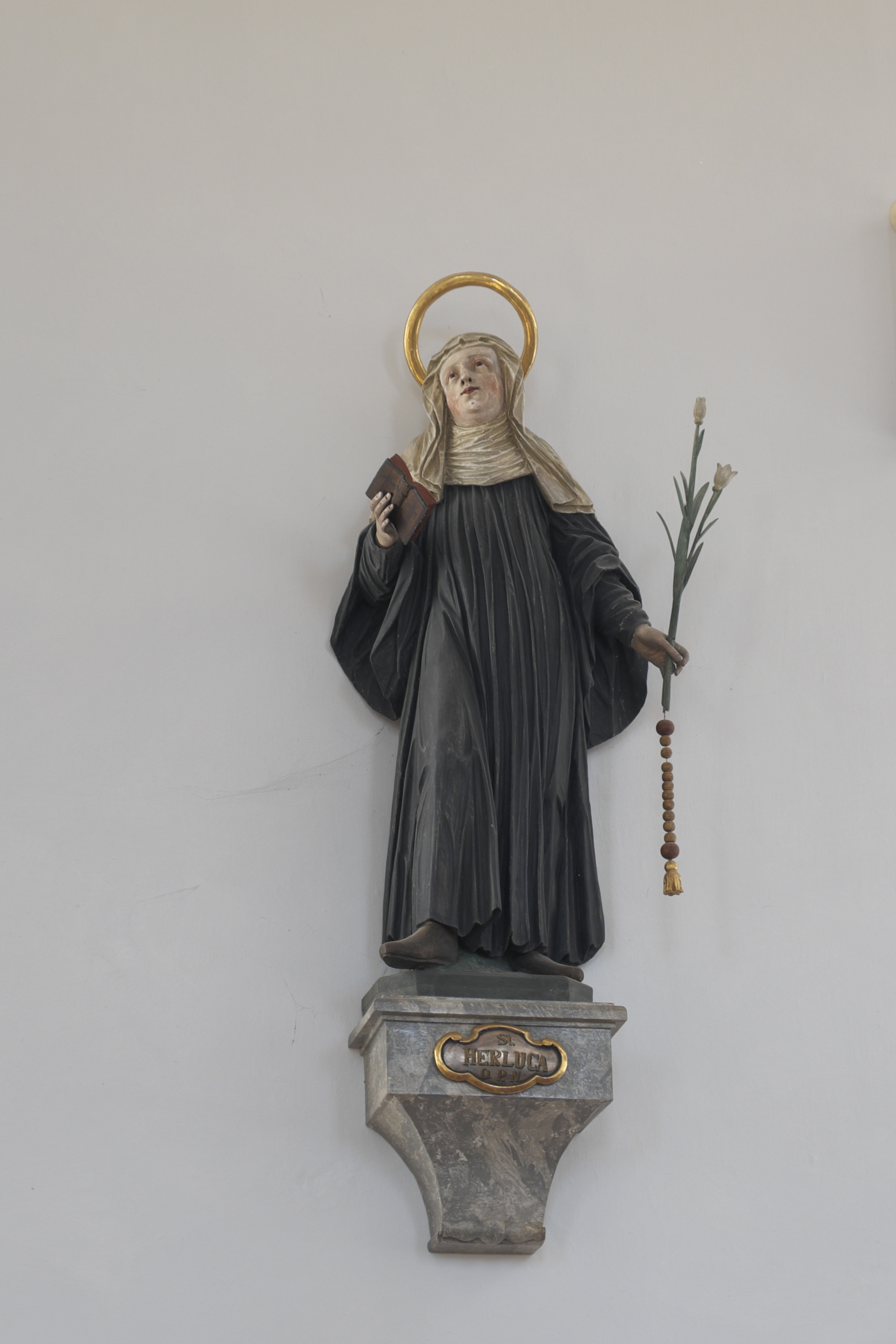
Figure of Herluka von Bernried in the Church of St. Bartholomäus in Epfach

== Life ==
Herluka devoted her life to asceticism, living in voluntary poverty and choosing to be celibate. She lived most of her life in the Swabian village of Epfach before moving to Bernried in 1121. It is speculated that she moved there possibly to flee a peasant uprising, some historians also believe Herluka moved to Bernried after the priest Sigeboto (a companion of hers) was appointed there.

=== Visions and opposition to unchaste priests ===
Herluka was documented to have had several visions which directed her life as a holy woman. In one such vision Wikterp, the former bishop of Augsburg and a bloodied Christ appeared to her. Wikterp told Herluka that the suffering of Christ she was witnessing was caused by priestly immorality. As a result of the vision, she refused to attend masses or take consecrated bread from unchaste priests, including Richard, the local priest working in Epfach. According to Paul, this public rejection of non-celibate priests encouraged others to do the same and raised public support for Gregorian reform.
