= Emanuel Hecht =

German writer and educator (1821-1862)

Emanuel Hecht (1821–1862) was a German writer and educator from the 19th century. He was notable for writing Jewish devotional works and religious text books.

== Early life and education ==
Emanuel Hecht was born in 1821 in Nordheim (now Nordheim am Main), Germany. In 1842 Hecht graduated from the Royal Training College for Teachers in Würzburg. After the district government of Lower Franconia appointed Hecht instructor of admission candidates of that school, Hecht relinquished the position, devoting himself to teaching Jewish youth.

== Career ==
Hecht went on to publish many essays during his three years of service in a Lower Franconian small community. These essays were published in Jewish periodicals, Jewish schools via Biblical history books and in a Hebrew primer.

In 1842 Hecht wrote Biblische Gesch and Handbüchlein für Leseschüler des Hebräischen.

David Einhorn invited Hecht to Hoppstädten in 1845 to serve as a Jewish communal school teacher which Hecht accepted.

About a decade later, Hecht wrote Israel's Gesch. von der Zeit des Bibelabschlusses bis zur Gegenwart. The book was about the Israelites' history from Alexander's time through when the book was written.

In 1856 he published a prayerbook for Jewish women, Kos Yeshuot (Kelch des Heils), which included prayers for an unhappy wife, prayers for confirmation ceremonies, and a prayer on the birthday of a husband. The book also presented prayers meant to be recited by the entire family at home.

In 1856, Hecht campaigned vigorously for and was awarded full recognition by Birkenfeld's Jewish communal schools making them equal to their Christian counterparts. This was in conjunction with David Einhorn's successor being promoted in the provincial office. Hecht was elected provincial council member two years later. That same year Hecht published a short lived religious journal in 1858 titled "Der Israelitische Haus- und Schulfreund," along with his Versuch das Hebräische Durch Deutsche Wörter zu Erlernen work.

1859 was a busy year for Hecht as he authored three writings: Die Hebräische Vorschule, Der Uebersetzungslehrer and Kleine Hebräische Grammatik in addition to him also being on trial before the provincial court. He was charged with reviling the state religion in his Unterscheidungslehre Zwischen Juden- und Christenthum publication. writing, but he was fully exonerated. Some of Hecht's subsequent works after his exoneration included Das Judenthum: ein Religionsbuch für Höhere Schulen and Liederbuch für Israelitische Schulen in 1860. Hecht's last writing was Der Pentateuch in Lehrreichen und Erbaulichen Betrachtungen, Erzählungen und Gedichten in 1862 shortly before his death.

Some of Hecht's historical and pedagogical studies that he published were a monograph on the Jews of Treves (Trier) along with Der Vorsängerdienst der Israeliten nach Seiner Gesetzlichen Entwickelung (which was described as a pamphlet).

== Later life and death ==
The University of Bonn awarded Hecht an honorary Ph.D due to his literary works. Hecht died on February 25, 1862.

== 1840s ==
- Biblische Gesch, (1842)
- Handbüchlein für Leseschüler des Hebräischen, (1842)
- Ueber Sabbath und Feiertagsschulen und deren Einrichtung (1842)

== 1850s ==
- Israel's Gesch. von der Zeit des Bibelabschlusses bis zur Gegenwart (1855 - the third edition ib that was released in 1877 was such in name only, being mostly new material by M. Kayserling; English. translation. of 1st ed. by Max Lilienthal 1857 from Cincinnati)
- Geschäftsaufsätze für Schulen ib.
- Häster's Lesebücher für die Israelitischen Schulen Bearbeitet (1855)
- Kos Yeshuot "Kelch des Heils." Ein Andachtsbuch für Frauen und Jungfrauen jüdischen Glaubens (Brilon, 1856)
- Versuch das Hebräische Durch Deutsche Wörter zu Erlernen (1858)
- Der Pentateuch Grammatisch Zergliedert (1858)
- Versuch das Hebräische Durch Deutsche Wörter zu Erlernen (1858)
- Die Hebräische Vorschule, ib. (1859)
- Der Uebersetzungslehrer, ib. (1859)
- Unterscheidungslehre Zwischen Juden- und Christenthum (1859)

== 1860s ==
- Das Judenthum: ein Religionsbuch für Höhere Schulen ib. (1860)
- Liederbuch für Israelitische Schulen, ib. (1860)
- Die Heilsquelle: Vollständiges Hebräisches Gebetbuch mit Deutscher Uebersetzung Nebst einem Anhange mit Deutschen Gebeten (1860)
- Der Trostbecher (1861)
- Der Pentateuch in Lehrreichen und Erbaulichen Betrachtungen, Erzählungen und Gedichten (1862)
