= Bavarian Landtag elections in the Weimar Republic =

German state elections

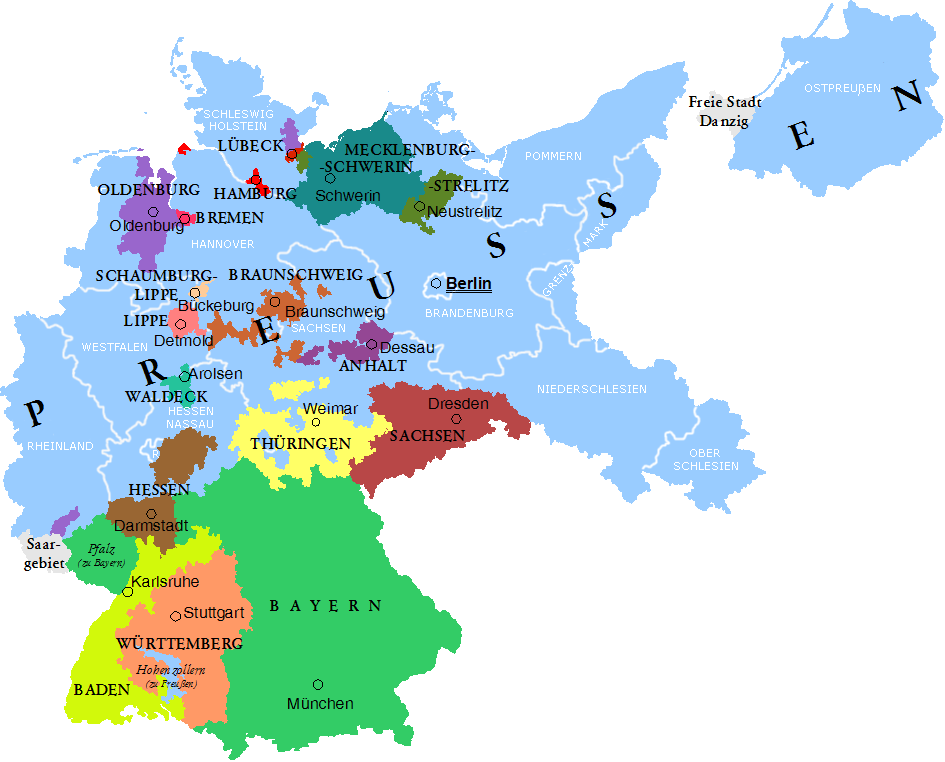
Bavaria in the Weimar Republic. At the bottom center in bright green.

Landtag elections in the Free State of Bavaria (Freistaat Bayern) during the Weimar Republic were held at irregular intervals between 1919 and 1932. Results with regard to the total vote, the percentage of the vote won, the number of seats allocated to each party and the change in distribution of seats are presented in the tables below. On 31 March 1933, the sitting Landtag was dissolved by the Nazi-controlled central government and reconstituted to reflect the distribution of seats in the national Reichstag. The Landtag subsequently was formally abolished as a result of the "Law on the Reconstruction of the Reich" of 30 January 1934 which replaced the German federal system with a unitary state.

== 1919 ==
The 1919 Bavarian state election was held on 12 January and 2 February 1919 to elect the 180 members of the Landtag.

Results of the 1919 Bavarian State Election

Graph of the party split among 180 seats.
Party	Votes	%	Seats
Bavarian People's Party	1,193,101	34.99	66
Social Democratic Party	1,124,584	32.98	61
German People's Party (Note: Bavarian branch of the DDP)	477,992	14.02	25
Bavarian Peasants' League	310,165	9.10	16
Bavarian National-Liberal Party (Note: Bavarian branch of the DVP) / Bavarian Middle Party / German People's Party in the Palatinate (Note: Bavarian branch of the DVP)	196,818	5.77	9
Independent Social Democratic Party	86,254	2.53	3
Others	20,627	0.60	0
Total	3,409,541	100.00	180
Valid votes	3,409,541	99.38	
Invalid/blank votes	21,377	0.62	
Total votes	3,430,918	100.00	
Registered voters/turnout	3,977,614	86.26	
Source: Gonschior

== 1920 ==
The 1920 Bavarian state election was held on 6 June 1920 to elect the 155 members of the Landtag.

Map of the results of the 1920 Bavarian Landtag Election

Graph of the party split among 155 seats.
Party	Votes	%	+/–	Seats	+/–
Bavarian People's Party	1,168,896	39.39	+4.40	65	−1
Social Democratic Party	486,528	16.39	−16.59	25	−36
Bavarian Middle Party (Note: Bavarian branch of the DNVP) / German People's Party	401,936	13.54	−4.24	19	+10
Independent Social Democratic Party	383,614	12.93	+10.40	20	+17
German Democratic Party	240,375	8.10	−5.92	12	−13
Bavarian Peasants' League	234,918	7.92	−1.18	12	−4
Communist Party of Germany (Spartacus League)	51,602	1.74	New	2	New
Total	2,967,869	100.00	–	155	−25
Valid votes	2,967,869	97.44	−1.94		
Invalid/blank votes	77,924	2.56	+1.94		
Total votes	3,045,793	100.00	–		
Registered voters/turnout	4,021,399	75.74	−10.52		
Source: Gonschior

=== Members from Coburg ===
Following the incorporation of Coburg into Bavaria, the Coburg Landtag elected two Social Democratic Party members and one German Democratic Party member to join the Bavarian Landtag from 1 July 1920.

A by-election was held in Coburg on 7 November 1920 to elect the region's three members to the Bavarian Landtag.

Party	Votes	%	Seats
United List of the Bavarian Middle Party, the German People's Party and the Coburg Farmers' Association	8,442	32.79	1
Social Democratic Party	8,429	32.74	1
German Democratic Party	6,958	27.03	1
Independent Social Democratic Party	1,914	7.44	0
Total	25,743	100.00	3
Valid votes	25,743	98.54	
Invalid/blank votes	381	1.46	
Total votes	26,124	100.00	
Registered voters/turnout	45,670	57.20	
Source: Gonschior

== 1924 ==
The 1924 Bavarian state election was held on 6 April and 4 May 1924 to elect the 129 members of the Landtag.

Map of the 1924 Landtag Election results by electoral district.

Graph of the party split among 129 seats.
Party	Votes	%	+/–	Seats	+/–
Bavarian People's Party	982,348	32.84	−6.55	46	−19
Social Democratic Party	513,590	17.17	+0.78	23	−2
Völkischer Bloc	512,271	17.12	−4.24	23	New
United National Right (Bavarian Middle Party (Note: Bavarian branch of the DNVP) / German People's Party (Note: Ran only in the Palatinate))	281,707	9.42	-4.12	11	-8
Communist Party of Germany	247,724	8.28	New	9	+7
Bavarian Peasants' and Small Businesses' League	213,450	7.13	−1.18	10	−2
German Bloc (DDP)	94,925	3.17	−5.92	3	−9
Centre Party (Note: Ran only in the Palatinate)	34,772	1.16	New	1	New
National-Liberal State Party of Bavaria	29,054	0.97	New	1	New
Kratofiel Civil Servants Group	23,225	0.78	New	1	New
Christian-Social Party	21,881	0.73	New	1	New
Independent Social Democratic Party	2,585	0.09	−12.84	0	−23
Others	34,153	1.14	–	–	–
Total	2,991,685	100.00	–	129	–
Valid votes	2,991,685	97.42	−0.02		
Invalid/blank votes	79,194	2.58	+0.02		
Total votes	3,070,879	100.00	–		
Registered voters/turnout	4,279,507	71.76	−3.98		
Source: Gonschior, Schröder

== 1928 ==
The 1928 Bavarian state election was held on 20 May 1928 to elect the 128 members of the Landtag.

Map of the results of the 1928 Bavarian Landtag Election

Graph of the party split among 128 seats.
Party	Votes	%	+/–	Seats	+/–
Bavarian People's Party	1,045,963	31.57	−1.27	46	±0
Social Democratic Party	802,951	24.24	+7.07	34	+11
Bavarian Peasants' and Small Businesses' League	382,104	11.53	+4.40	17	+7
German National People's Party	306,649	9.26	−0.16	13	+2
National Socialist German Workers' Party	203,115	6.13	New	9	New
Communist Party of Germany	125,842	3.80	−4.48	5	−4
German People's Party/National-Liberal Party	109,524	3.31	+2.34	4	+3
German Democratic People's Party/German Democratic Party of the Palatinate	108,771	3.28	+0.11	0	−3
Economic Party	105,808	3.19	New	0	New
Christian People's Service	43,867	1.32	New	0	New
People's Justice Party (VRP–CSRP–BGK)	43,778	1.32	New	0	New
Others	34,572	1.04	–	–	–
Total	3,312,944	100.00	–	128	–
Valid votes	3,312,944	96.97	−0.45		
Invalid/blank votes	103,595	3.03	+0.45		
Total votes	3,416,539	100.00	–		
Registered voters/turnout	4,607,846	74.15	−2,39		
Source: Gonschior

== 1932 ==
The 1932 Bavarian state election was held on 24 April 1932 to elect the 128 members of the Landtag. In the aftermath of the election, Heinrich Held was reinstated as Minister President of Bavaria in what became the Held IV cabinet, forming a minority coalition with the DNVP.

Graph of the party split among 128 seats.
Party	Votes	%	+/–	Seats	+/–
Bavarian People's Party	1,272,005	32.55	+0.98	45	−1
National Socialist German Workers' Party	1,270,792	32.52	+26.39	43	+34
Social Democratic Party	603,693	15.45	−8.79	20	−14
Communist Party of Germany	259,338	6.64	+2.84	8	+3
Bavarian Peasants' and Small Businesses' League	252,256	6.46	−5.07	9	−8
DNVP	127,870	3.27	−5.99	3	−10
DVP / Wirtschaftspartei	65,947	1.69	−1.62	0	−4
Christian Social People's Service	42,158	1.08	+0.24	0	±0
Others	13,667	0.35	–	–	–
Total	3,907,726	100.00	–	128	–
Valid votes	3,907,726	99.64	+2.67		
Invalid/blank votes	14,157	0.36	−2.67		
Total votes	3,921,883	100.00	–		
Registered voters/turnout	4,963,919	79.01	+4.86		
Source: Gonschior
