= Bayernhymne =

Regional anthem of Bavaria, Germany

English: Bavaria Hymn
- The Bayernhymne published by Bavaria
- Regional anthem of Bavaria
- Also known as: Für Bayern (English: For Bavaria)
- Lyrics: Michael Öchsner / Joseph Maria Lutz, 1946
- Music: Max Kunz, 1835
- Adopted: 1860; 1946 (as regional anthem)

Audio sample
- file; help

External videos
- Video by the official YouTube channel of the Bavarian state government
- Bayernhymne

The Bayernhymne (Bavaria Hymn) is the official anthem of Bavaria, Germany.

== History ==
The melody of the song was written by Max Kunz in 1835. The text for the original first three stanzas was written by Michael Öchsner. Both men were members of the Bürger-Sänger-Zunft München (Citizen-Singers-Guild Munich), that first performed the song on December 15, 1860.

In 1946, the poet Joseph Maria Lutz wrote a new third stanza as a replacement for the Königsstrophe (King's Stanza), since after the abdication of King Ludwig III in 1918, Bavaria has been without a king. He also replaced the Deutsche Erde (German soil) in the first stanza with Heimaterde (native soil).

In 1946, it was also officially recognised as the national anthem of Bavaria, and on July 29, 1966, the then prime minister of Bavaria, Alfons Goppel, chose the version written by Joseph Maria Lutz to be the official version.

In 1980, the Bavarian minister-president Franz Josef Strauß changed the official version to contain just the first two stanzas and switched Heimaterde back to Deutsche Erde, though the Heimaterde version is still widely used (for example, it was sung during the visit of Pope Benedict XVI to his native Bavaria in 2006, who also joined in singing this version).

The song, like most national anthems, contains many symbolic representations, including repeated allusions to the colours white and blue, Bavaria's national colours, especially describing Bavaria's Himmel, which can refer to both sky and heaven. The march Bayerischer Defiliermarsch is often played along the hymn.

== Current version ==
(According to the bulletin of the Bavarian prime minister on July 18, 1980.)

Gott mit dir, du Land der Bayern, deutsche Erde, Vaterland!
Über deinen weiten Gauen ruhe seine Segenshand!
Er behüte deine Fluren, schirme deiner Städte Bau
und erhalte dir die Farben seines Himmels, weiß und blau!

Gott mit dir, dem Bayernvolke, dass wir, uns'rer Väter wert,
fest in Eintracht und in Frieden bauen uns'res Glückes Herd!
Dass mit Deutschlands Bruderstämmen einig uns ein jeder schau
und den alten Ruhm bewähre unser Banner, weiß und blau!

Translation:

God be with you, land of the Bavarians, German soil, fatherland!
Over your wide shires rest His blessing hand!
May He protect your meadows, shield the structures of your towns
and preserve you the colours of His sky, white and blue!

God be with you, people of Bavaria, that we, worthy of our fathers,
firm in harmony and peace, may build our fortune's hearth!
That everyone may see us one with Germany's brother tribes,
And the old splendour stands the test, our Banner, white and blue!

== Variations ==
=== Version by Joseph Maria Lutz from 1946 ===
Gott mit dir, du Land der Bayern, Heimaterde, Vaterland!
Über deinen weiten Gauen walte seine Segenshand!
Er behüte deine Fluren, schirme deiner Städte Bau
und erhalte dir die Farben deines Himmels, weiß und blau!

Gott mit uns, dem Bayernvolke, wenn wir, unsrer Väter wert,
stets in Eintracht und in Frieden bauen unsres Glückes Herd!
Dass vom Alpenland zum Maine jeder Stamm sich fest vertrau,
und die Herzen freudig eine unser Banner, weiß und blau!

Gott mit uns und Gott mit allen, die der Menschen heilig Recht
treu beschützen und bewahren von Geschlechte zu Geschlecht.
Frohe Arbeit, frohes Feiern, reiche Ernten jedem Gau,
Gott mit dir, du Land der Bayern unterm Himmel, weiß und blau!

Translation:

God be with thee, land of the Bavarians, Native soil, fatherland!
Over thy wide area rules His blessing hand!
He shall protect thy meadows, shield the buildings of thy towns
and preserve thee the colours of your sky, white and blue!

God be with us, people of Bavaria, that we, to our fathers’ worth,
fixed in harmony and peace build our own fortunes!
That from the Alps to the Main every tribe may firmly trust
And our hearts may with joy unite in our Banner, white and blue!

God be with us and God be with all who protect the holy rights of men
faithfully, and who preserve it from generation to generation.
Happy in work, happy in celebration, rich harvesting in every field.
God be with thee, Land of the Bavarians under heaven, white and blue!

=== Michael Öchsner’s 1860 Poem ===
Gott mit dir, du Land der Bayern, deutsche Erde, Vaterland!
Über deinen weiten Gauen ruhe seine Segenshand!
Er behüte deine Fluren, schirme deiner Städte Bau
und der Himmel dir erhalte seine Farben – Weiß und Blau.

Gott mit dir, dem Bayernvolke, dass wir unsrer Väter wert,
fest in Eintracht und in Friede bauen unseres Glückes Herd;
dass der Freund da Hilfe finde, wehrhaft uns der Gegner schau,
wo die Rauten-Banner wehen, unsre Farben – Weiß und Blau!

Gott mit ihm, dem Bayer-König, Vater Max aus Wittelsbach!
Über seinem Hause wölbe sich des Himmels schirmend’ Dach!
Gott erhalte uns den Herrscher, Volkes-Glück in jedem Gau,
reine Sitte, deutsche Treue, ew’ge Farben – Weiß und Blau.

Translation:

God be with thee, Land of the Bavarians, German soil, fatherland!
Over thy wide area rest His merciful hand!
He shall protect thy meadows, shield the buildings of thy towns
and in His Heaven He lifts up to you His colours – white and blue.

God be with you, the people of Bavaria, that we, with our fathers’ worth,
fixed in harmony and in peace build our own fortunes;
that our friend would find help there, that we are well-fortified our foes we show,
where the rhombus-banner waves, our colours – white and blue!

God be with him, the Bavarian King, father Max from Wittelsbach!
Over his House arches Heaven’s shining roof!
God lifts up for us the monarch, people’s Fortune in every place,
pure customs, German loyalty, eternal colours – white and blue.

=== Later Text from Michael Öchsner ===
Gott mit dir, du Land der Bayern, deutsche Erde, Vaterland!
Über deinen weiten Gauen walte deine Segenshand!
Er behüte deine Fluren, schirme deiner Städte Bau
und erhalte dir die Farben seines Himmels – Weiß und Blau!

Gott mit dir, dem Bayernvolke, dass wir, unserer Väter wert,
fest in Eintracht und in Frieden bauen unseres Glückes Herd!
Dass mit Deutschlands Bruderstämmen einig uns der Gegner schau
[Variante: Dass in Not und in Gefahren einig uns der Gegner schau]
und den alten Ruhm bewähre unser Banner – weiß und blau.

Gott mit ihm, dem Bayerkönig! Segen über sein Geschlecht!
Denn mit seinem Volk in Frieden wahrt er dessen heilig Recht.
Gott mit ihm, dem Landesvater! Gott mit uns in jedem Gau!
Gott mit dir, du Land der Bayern, deutsche Heimat – weiß und blau!

Translation:

God be with the, Land of the Bavarians, German soil, fatherland!
Over thy wide area rule thy merciful hand!
He shall protect your meadows, shield the buildings of thy towns
and lift up for the colours of His Heaven - white and blue!

God be with you, the people of Bavaria, that we, with our fathers’ worth,
fixed in harmony and in peace build our own fortunes!
That with bonds of German brotherhood we are united our foes we show
[Variation: That in woe and in peril we are united our foes we show]
and the old splendour stands the test our Banner – white and blue.

God be with him, the Bavarian King! Blessing over his generation!
Because with his people in peace he preserves his sacred law.
God be with him, the sovereign! God be with us in every place!
God be with you, Land of Bavaria, German homeland – white and blue!
