= Hilde Kramer =

German communist translator and stenographer (1900–1974)

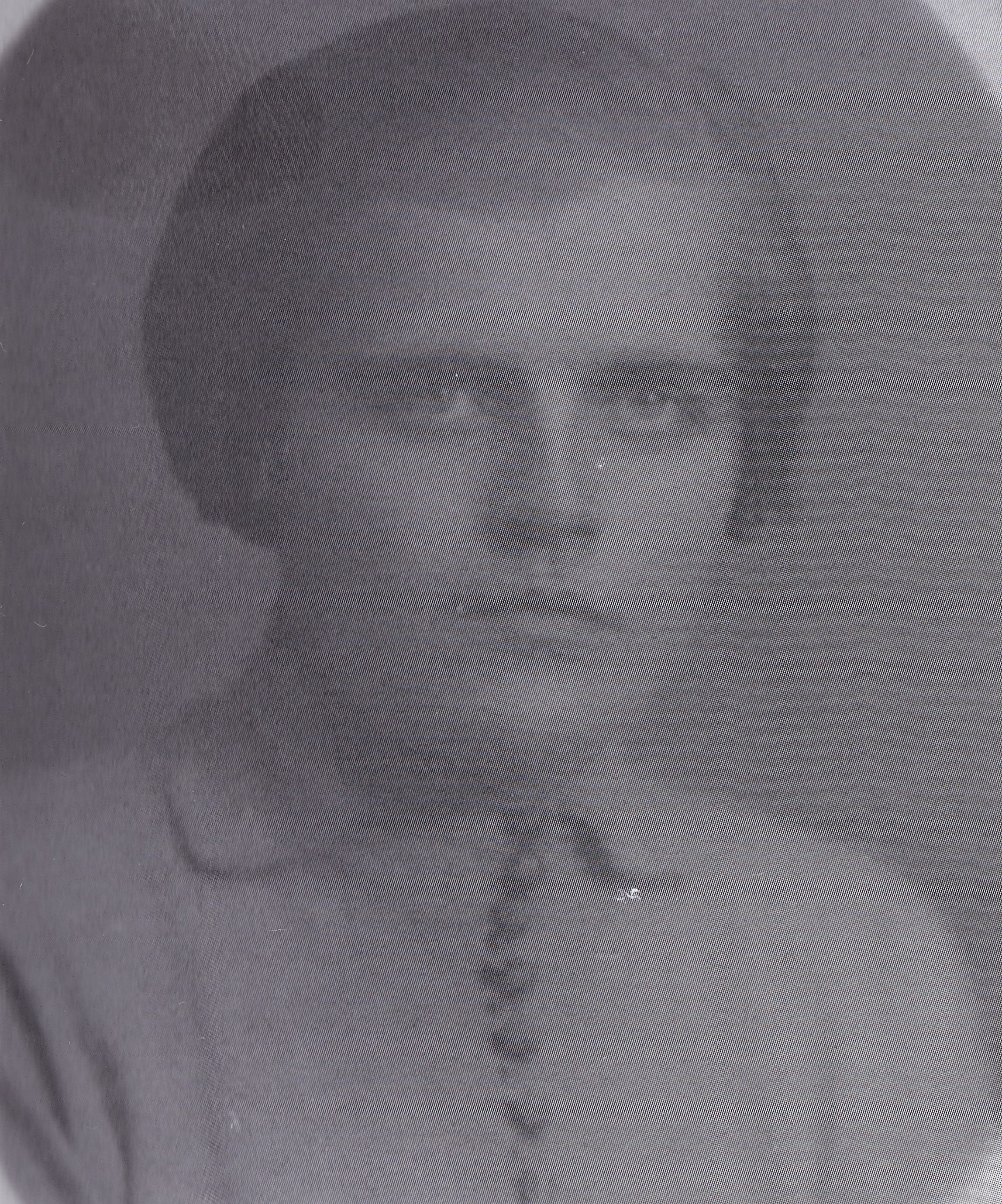
- Kramer in 1920
- Born: 11 April 1900; Leipzig, Imperial Germany
- Died: 10 July 1974 (aged 74); Otley, United Kingdom
- Occupations: Translator, courier, stenographer, author

Hilde Kramer (11 April 1900 – 10 July 1974) was a German communist translator, stenographer and messenger who participated in the German revolution of 1918–1919 and worked for the Communist International during the interwar period. She later lived in exile in the United Kingdom and continued to participate in left-wing and antifascist movements.

== Life ==
Kramer was orphaned as a child, and lived with her sister Frida's family until 1910, when she was adopted by the Kaetzler family in Munich. Kramer's adoptive family was also engaged in left wing politics. Her adoptive sister, Frida, was a typist for Inprecor, and her adoptive mother, Gabriele, was the daughter of the Prussian admiral Max Von der Goltz and an employee of the Soviet telegraph agency ROSTA. Kramer was described as unusually tall by her contemporaries. Charles Shipman, who she had a brief affair with in Berlin, called her a "tall, statuesque beauty," and Oskar Maria Graf called her "The gigantic girl with the Titus cut."

Kramer participated in the German revolution from its beginning, and was initially affiliated with the International Communists of Germany (IKD), led by Johann Knief. She was a founding member of the IKD's local affiliate, the Association of Revolutionary Internationalists of Bavaria (VRI), alongside Erich Mühsam and others. Kramer traveled to Berlin in late 1918 to attend the regional congress of the IKD, and met with delegates from the Spartacus League including Karl Leibknecht. Kramer did not stay in Berlin for the founding congress of the Communist Party of Germany (KPD), but she joined the party in late 1918.

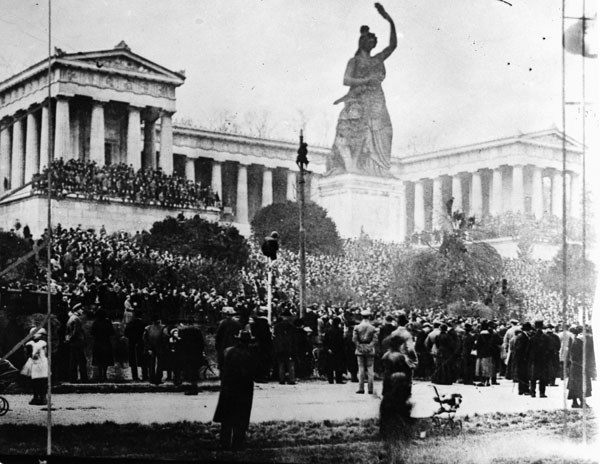
7 November peace rally in 1918, which Kramer wrote that she had attended in a letter.

On 6 December 1918, Kramer and other members of the VRI were arrested at the editorial offices of several local newspapers, during a demonstration where they attempted to force the newspapers to publish a statement by the VRI. She was imprisoned along with a group of other revolutionaries including Eugen Leviné, Max Levien, and Erich Mühsam, who were freed after Rudolf Egelhofer convinced Kurt Eisner to commute their sentences. Shortly thereafter, Egelhofer took Kramer on as a secretary.

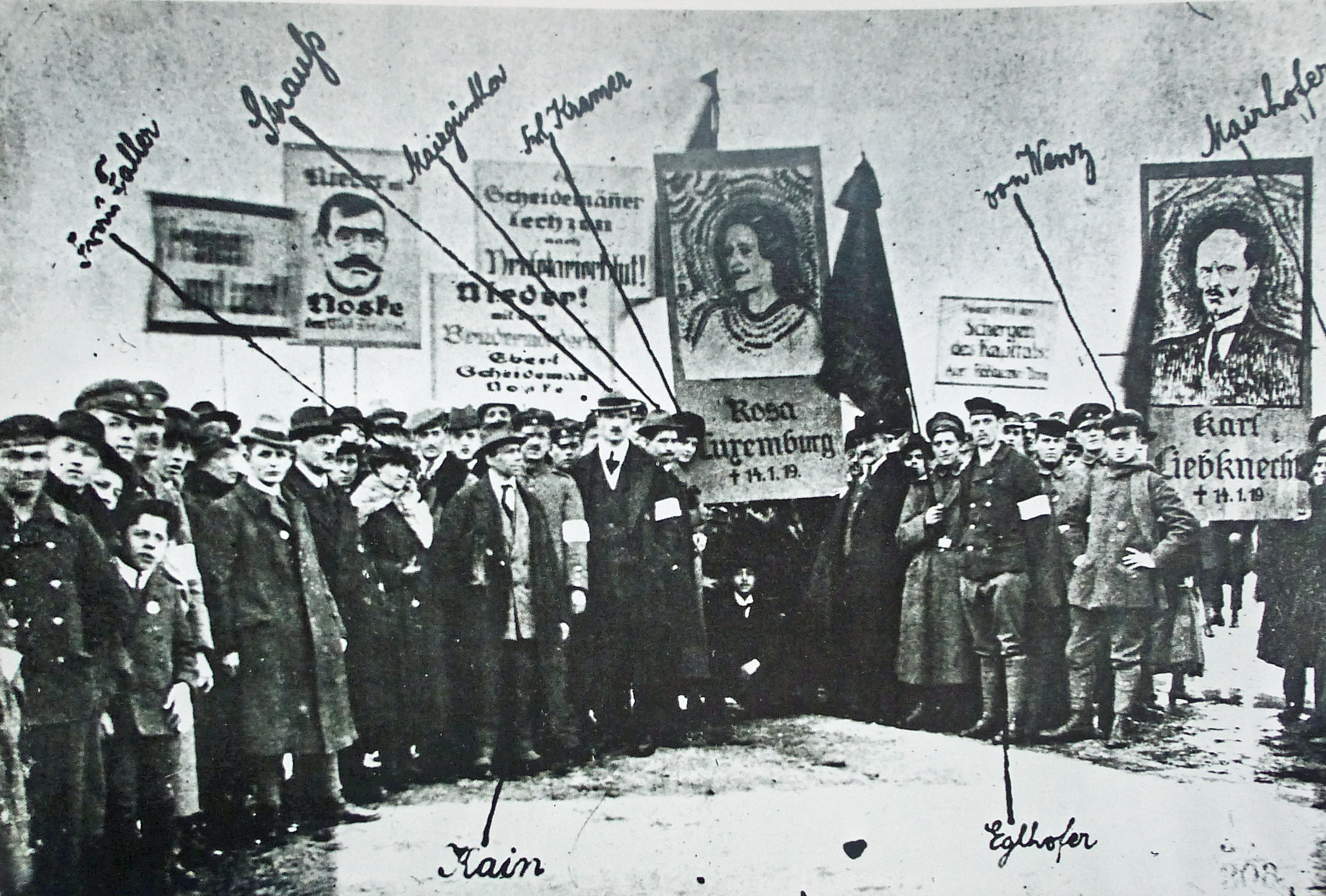
Photograph of a Munich demonstration led by communists in February 1919. A woman labelled "Kramer" is shown next to a portrait of Rosa Luxemburg.

With the proclamation of the Bavarian Soviet Republic following Eisner's assassination, she continued to work as Egelhofer's secretary after he became the City Commandant of Munich, and worked as a courier, distributing false passports and reports for Die Rote Fahne. Kramer was arrested again in May 1919 after the overthrow of the Soviet Republic, and was exiled from Bavaria. She fled Munich to Berlin on false papers and began working first with the journalist Wilhelm Herzog and later for the Comintern's West European Secretariat.

In 1920, Kramer traveled to Moscow at the invitation of Mikhail Borodin to participate in the 2nd World Congress of the Communist International as a shorthand typist and a German-English translator and assistant to Karl Radek. Kramer traveled from Berlin to Stettin, where she boarded a boat chartered by Jakov Reich to Tallinn, Estonia, but the ship was refused at the port and had to divert to Narva. From there, she traveled to Petrograd by train. After the second congress, she worked for several weeks on transcribing the shorthand record of the Congress into an official record of the proceedings. She then worked for four months at the Comintern Secretariat in Moscow, before returning to Berlin via Finland and Stettin. While in Moscow she met the Irish communist Edward Fitzgerald, a writer and editor who she would work with in Berlin. She later married him and they had a son together.

Kramer continued to work for the West European Secretariat as the secretary of Mikhail Borodin. In 1926, she found work in the press office of International Red Aid. However, in 1929, she was expelled from the KPD as a "right-deviationist" and dismissed from her post. In response, she joined the Communist Party of Germany (Opposition) in 1929, and later joined the Socialist Workers' Party of Germany (SAPD) when the KPD-O merged with the Independent Social Democratic Party of Germany (USPD) to form that organization.

Fitzgerald fled Germany shortly after the Nazi takeover, but Kramer was not permitted to leave until 1937. She and her son fled to England, obtaining the right to emigrate after the UK recognized her Soviet marriage to Fitzgerald. However, she lived apart from Fitzgerald for the rest of her life. He had fallen in love with another woman and lived in Paris and later Amsterdam. In addition to English and German, Kramer was a fluent speaker of French. From London, Kramer wrote about events in Germany for the Paris-based newspaper of the SAPD. She later became an active member of the Labour Party and worked as a secretary for the social scientist Richard Titmuss. In 1954 she published a sociological paper, Studies in the Social Services: History of the Second World War, which discussed the role of gender in wartime social welfare programs. Kramer died on 17 February 1974 in Otley, West Yorkshire, United Kingdom.
