= Franz Lipp =

German politician (1855–1937)

Franz Antoni Lipp (9 February 1855, Karlsruhe – 18 March 1937, Florence) was a German lawyer and politician. He served as the Deputy of Foreign Affairs in the Ernst Toller Government of the Bavarian Socialist Republic. Lipp's tenure in government was marked by his eccentric behavior, particularly his diplomatic telegram to Vladimir Lenin and Pope Benedict XV, where he mentioned the disappearance of the ministry's "key to the toilet." Additionally, he attempted to declare war on Switzerland and Württemberg.

== Life before the German Revolution ==
Franz Lipp was born on 9 February 1855, in Karlsruhe. In the 1880s, Lipp became the son in law of Karl Mayer, one of the co-founders of the German People's Party. In his early adulthood, he worked as a journalist for the Stuttgart Observer, the newspaper of the German People's Party. In 1888, he became the editor-in-chief of the Heilbronner Zeitung. Lipp ran as a candidate for the Landtag of Württemberg in the Grand Bailiwick of Heilbronn, representing the German People's Party and receiving support from the Social Democratic Party. However, he was defeated in the second round of voting, garnering 1,767 votes out of the 3,852 cast.

While working at the Heilbronn newspaper, Lipp faced prosecution for the crime of lèse-majesté and was subsequently forced into exile, first in Switzerland and later in Italy. He relocated to Milan, where he joined the staff of Corriere della Sera. At the age of 51, Lipp experienced his first episode of mental illness, characterized by agitation and delusions of persecution, which led to his hospitalization. Two years later, he was hospitalized again following a suicide attempt.

Several contemporary sources at the time of the Bavarian Socialist Republic with an anti-Communist stance, based on unreliable police information, claim that Lipp was an intelligence agent for Germany at the beginning of World War I. According to the French journalist Ambrose Got, Lipp engaged in espionage activities while in Italy. Upon his return to Germany, he publicly boasted about having access to military maps while pretending to be friends with a geography professor from Pavia. With the outbreak of war, Lipp returned to Switzerland. It was during his time with the German General Staff that he came into contact with foreign revolutionaries, including the Bolshevik Karl Radek. Lipp supposedly participated in negotiations with Radek, while also infiltrating German revolutionary groups and providing information to the authorities about their activities.

Some contemporary sources suggest that Lipp "took part" or "participated" in the Zimmerwald Conference, and the Kiental Conference. However, the rumor of Lipp's presence as a spy at the Zimmerwald Conference persisted only during the brief period of the Bavarian Socialist Republic. Scholar Richard Sheppard, writing in 1992, considered these rumors unreliable as he found no mention of Lipp in the literature dedicated to the conference. If Lipp did attend the conference, he was not listed as one of the ten German delegates.

Upon his return to Germany in 1917, Lipp's defeatist remarks caught attention, leading to his internment under 'protective detention' (Schutzhaft) until the end of the war. There were even suspicions of espionage for the benefit of an enemy power, according to a source.

== Delegate for Foreign Affairs of the Bavarian Socialist Republic ==
On the night of 6 to 7 April 1919, inspired by the news of the Hungarian Soviet Republic, a revolutionary committee led by Ernst Toller declared the establishment of the Bavarian Socialist Republic in Munich. They formed a "revolutionary national council" comprising eleven delegates.

Lipp, an activist from the Independent Social Democratic Party of Germany, was appointed as the delegate for foreign affairs. Lipp was relatively unknown outside of his party. However, the circumstances surrounding his appointment are a matter of dispute between the testimonies of Ernst Toller and Ernst Niekisch. Toller claims that Lipp was appointed when his abilities were still unknown, while Niekisch asserts that Toller proposed Lipp, praising his skills.

During his tenure as delegate, Lipp gain attention for his peculiar and unconventional dispatches. Many historians consider his reference to the "key to the ministry's toilets" in the third dispatch as emblematic of the amateurish nature of the revolutionary government.

The first dispatch, addressed to the apostolic nuncio in Bavaria, Eugenio Pacelli, reads as follows:

"I consider it my sacred duty to ensure the safety of your very eminent person and of the entire nunciature in Munich. Please accept the expression of all my devotion. "

The second is addressed to the Bavarian Ambassador in Berlin and states:

"The opus primum non ultimum ne of Mr. Preuss on the constitution of Germany will never be a law requiring Bavaria. I cannot, in fact, sacrifice the special rights of Bavaria, won by the Bavarian blood shed at Wœrth and Sedan. That is why I am ordering you to pay a formal farewell visit to Count Brockdorff-Rantzau immediately."

The last is a telegram addressed to Vladimir Lenin, and also Pope Benedict XV according to some sources. The telegram reads as follows:

"Upper Bavarian proletariat are united in joy. Social Democrats, Independent Socialists, and Communists are united like a hammer, the League of Peasants with them. Liberal bourgeoisie, servants of Prussia have been completely disarmed. Hoffmann is on the run to Bamberg, where he took the key to my ministry toilet. Prussian policy, of which Hoffmann is the lackey, tries to cut us off from the region of Berlin-Leipzig-Nuremberg, Frankfurt, and the coal of Essen. At the same time, they try to discredit us with the Entente like the bloodthirsty dogs and looters they are. Meanwhile, Noske's furry gorilla hands are dripping with blood. We receive coal, and we receive a great deal of food from Switzerland and Italy. We want perpetual peace. Immanuel Kant, Towards Perpetual Peace, 1795, theses 2–5. Prussia envisages the armistice only with a view to revenge war."

Finally, Franz Lipp address his colleague in charge of transport, Gustav Paulukum, the following letter:

"Dear Colleague! I have just declared war on Württemberg and Switzerland, because these dogs refused to lend me sixty locomotives. I am sure we will win. Furthermore, in view of our victory, I will ask the Pope for his blessing – I am on good terms with him."

In addition, the American journalist Ben Hecht, whose testimony is not known for its reliability, recounts having seen Lipp persistently trying to get in touch with Clemenceau in order to offer him a separate peace with Bavaria. According to historian Helmut Neubauer, Lipp, during his tenure as Delegate of Foreign Affairs, was responsible for the release of a group of Russian prisoners of war.

A few days after his appointment, and under the insistent pressure of Ernst Toller or Erich Mühsam (each claiming credit in their respective memoirs), Franz Lipp was asked to resign and subsequently left the government. On Palm Sunday, troops loyal to the republican government of Joseph Hoffmann briefly arrested Franz Lipp, along with other delegates such as Erich Mühsam and Delegate of the Interior Fritz Soldmann, at the Munich Residence during an attempt to overthrow the Bavarian Soviet Republic, the so-called Palm Sunday Putsch; however, that attempt was soon defeated and the delegates were released.

== Later life and death ==
After the overthrow of the Bavarian Soviet Republic by the troops of the Social-Democratic central government of Germany and the Freikorps, Lipp's political career came to an end and he retreated from public life. Following his arrest, he was transferred from Ebrach prison to a psychiatric clinic. From that point onward, little information is available regarding his life until 1937. The archives of the city of Gengenbach contain the last references to Franz Lipp. According to these records, Lipp sought refuge in Florence, where he lived nearly blind and dependent on his children's care. He was compelled to prove his non-Jewish heritage in order to safeguard his house from confiscation by the Gestapo. Lipp died in Italy in 1937.

== In literary works ==
Franz Lipp is a prominent character in Tankred Dorst's play Toller. This play, while taking certain historical liberties, revolves around Lipp's involvement in the debate on the Jewish Question. One notable scene in the play portrays Lipp engaged in a discussion at a Chinese restaurant. Additionally, the play depicts Lipp's role in a significant event involving Eugen Leviné's disclosure of Toller's telegram to the Pope. Furthermore, the play features a poignant monologue by Lipp, which takes place during his time in a psychiatric hospital.
