= Rudolf Egelhofer =

German communist and sailor (1896–1919)

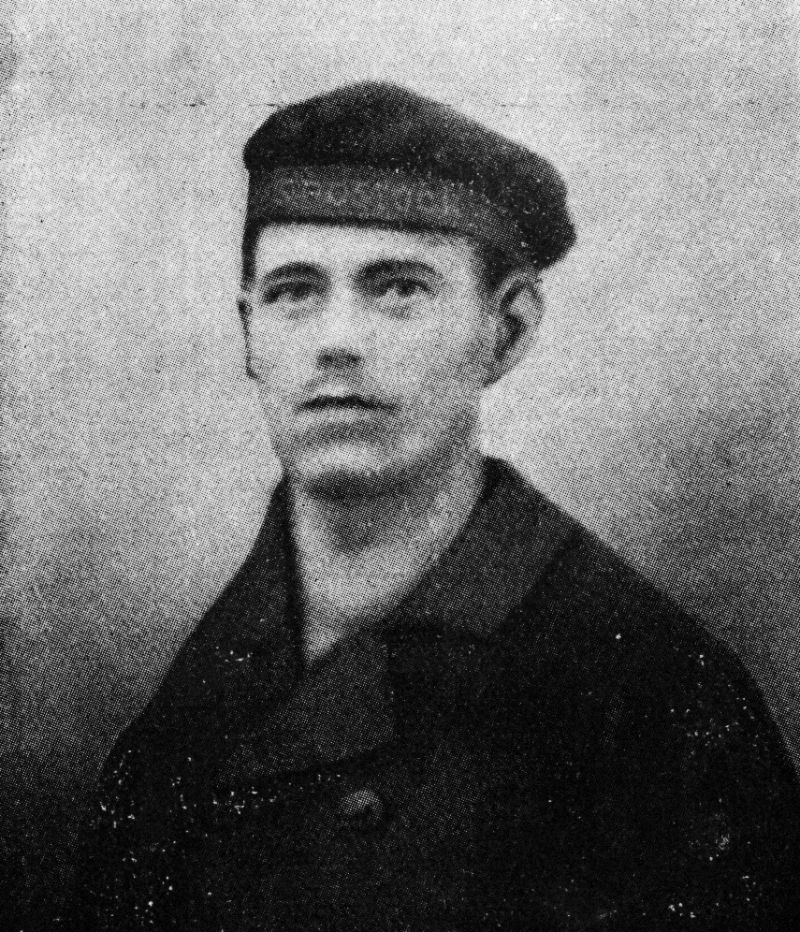
Egelhofer in uniform

Rudolf Egelhofer, in some sources also Eglhofer (13 April 1896 – 3 May 1919) was a German sailor, member of the Communist Party of Germany (KPD) and in April 1919 the City Commandant and "Red Army" commander of the Bavarian Soviet Republic.

== Life ==
Rudolf Egelhofer was born in Schwabing in apparently barren conditions in the family of sign painter Friedrich Egelhofer and his wife Maria. He early on joined the Imperial German Navy, but apparently, still young Rudolf had a disregard for authority. Already in 1913, as a 17-year-old ship's boy, he absenteed for the first time from his unit without permission, as evidenced by police files. Egelhofer also served in World War I as Marine infantry on the Western Front in Flanders.

In 1918, he was involved in the Kiel Mutiny that triggered the November Revolution. There, he was apparently arrested and allegedly sentenced to death. On 15 February 1919, he returned to his hometown together with 600 other armed sailors from Wilhelmshaven. There, under Kurt Eisner's (USPD) leadership the Wittelsbach Monarchy had been overthrown on 7 November, and the People's State of Bavaria had been proclaimed as a republic with Eisner as prime minister of an SPD/USPD government.

On 10 January Egelhofer rose at a Spartacist protest meeting in the Bavarian Foreign Ministry building and told the Council of Ministers, that a gathering of 5000 workers demanded the proclamation of a Council Republic, removal of the city commander Oskar Dürr (1877–1959, SPD politician and Tsar of Russia's vice consul in Munich), diplomatic relations with the Soviets in Russia and the establishment of a Red Army.

After Eisner's murder on 21 February 1919, the situation worsened. Egelhofer was directly involved in the revolutionary soldiers' council movement and joined the KPD. He was considered courageous, energetic and apparently also had a certain talent for speaking in public. The author Oskar Maria Graf wrote in his book Wir sind Gefangene about the first Red Army parade in Munich's Ludwigstrasse: "From an open window spoke E(n)gelhofer, the army commander. Determined and unaffected, in a sailor's uniform, he stood there, sometimes raising his fist. Whoever heard him had to believe him."

Egelhofer became active as a military leader for the first time in the successful rejection of the attempted coup on 13 April, known as the Palm Sunday Putsch against the Munich Council Republic, which had only been in existence for a week since 7 April. Revolutionary troops under his leadership stormed the Munich Central Station, held by supporters of the SPD exile government, who had fled to Bamberg. The coup failed, and the same day, Egelhofer was appointed city commander by the Munich Council, now dominated by KPD members as Eugen Leviné and Max Levien. Shortly after, he was appointed leader of Munich's "Red Army" consisting of soldiers and workers.

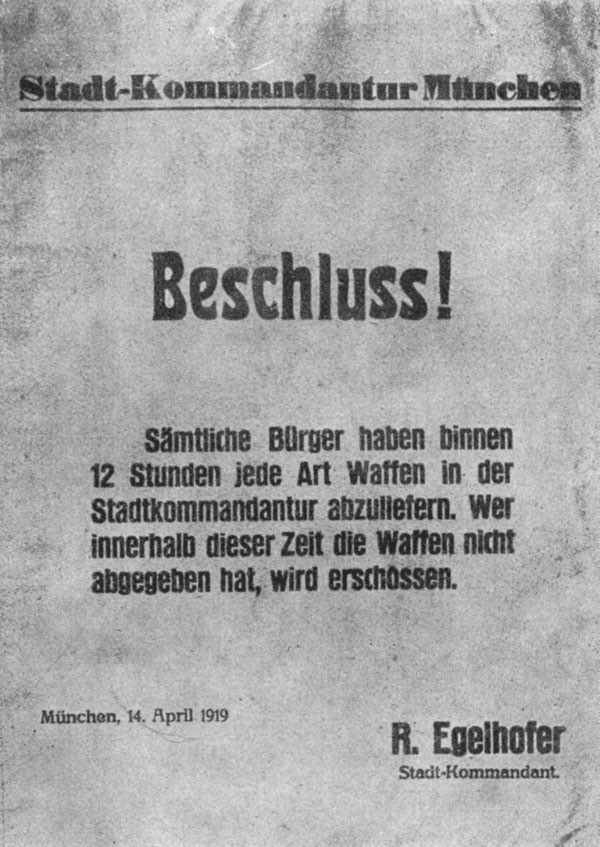
Public order on the issue of arms on 14 April 1919, signed by the city commandant Rudolf Egelhofer; one of the first measures of the new communist leadership of the Council Republic after the foiled Palm Sunday Putsch

He was replaced by the pacifist author Ernst Toller. The task, to within a few days organize the defense of Munich with an estimated 20,000 barely trained, poorly armed and highly motivated soldiers and workers against the approaching superiority of the "white" troops – Reichswehr army units and right-wing Nationalist Freikorps – which were called in by the Bamberg SPD leadership under Johannes Hoffmann, was not salvageable for the young seaman.

In the first days of May, the government troops overran the city. Sustained resistance only existed in a few places. Egelhofer was unable to enforce the idea of gathering relatives of the "Bourgeoisie" in the Theresienwiese and shooting them when the "whites" invaded the city. However, he gave written consent to the shooting of ten hostages, mainly from the Thule Society, in the Luitpold Gymnasium. The "Munich Hostage Murder" became the only documented evidence of the later claimed "red terror" during the council's reign.

Massive terror was however, exercised in the following years by the victorious "white" troops in Munich. Hundreds were shot dead or murdered. In total, more than 2,200 supporters of the Council Republic were condemned to death or imprisonment by tribunals. The 23-year-old Egelhofer as one of the most prominent representatives of the Communist council rule was discovered and arrested on 1 May 1919 in his hiding place in an apartment on Maximilianstraße. After severe maltreatment, he was shot dead without trial on 3 May at the Munich Residenz city palace, where he was being held.

== Commemorations ==
Army training- center named after him in East Germany

In East Germany, an Osa-class missile boat (1964), a Tarantul-class missile boat (1985, later USNS Hiddensee) and the NCO (noncommissioned officer) school I, later training center 6 of the land forces of the National People's Army in Haide near Weißwasser were named after Rudolf Egelhofer. There was a Rudolf Egelhofer Oberschule in Rostock, a Rudolf Egelhofer road exists to this day in Strausberg. In Munich, apparently, nothing is named after Egelhofer. Since October 2016, a commemorative plaque has been erected on the grave in the Munich Nordfriedhof. Also commemorative coins and porcelain plates with Egelhofer exists.
