= Palm Sunday Putsch =

1919 failed coup in the Weimar Republic

- Part of political violence in Germany (1918–1933)
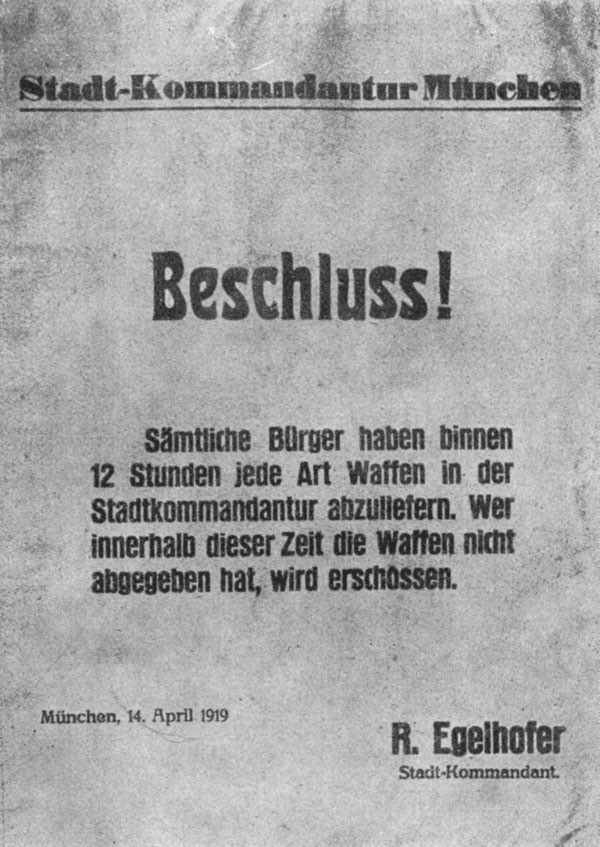
- Public order on the issue of arms on 14 April 1919, signed by Munich city commandant Rudolf Egelhofer. It was one of the first measures of the new communist leadership of the Bavarian Soviet Republic after the failed Palm Sunday Putsch. (Note: The text of the poster reads: "Decree! All citizens shall surrender all types of weapons to the city commandant's office within 12 hours. Those who have not surrendered their weapons by then will be shot.")
| Date | 13 April 1919 |
| Location | Bavaria, Weimar Republic |
| Result | Failure of the coup attempt; Radicalization of the Bavarian Soviet Republic government |

Belligerents
| Bavarian Soviet Republic | Bavaria |

Commanders and leaders
| Rudolf Egelhofer; Eugen Leviné; Max Levien; Ernst Toller; Gustav Landauer | Alfred Seyffertitz; Johannes Hoffmann; Citizens' Defense |

The Palm Sunday Putsch (German: Palmsonntagsputsch) of 13 April 1919 was a failed attempt by Bavarian militia to overthrow the week-old Bavarian Soviet Republic and restore the elected government under its minister-president, Johannes Hoffmann.

The putsch failed due to the resistance of fighters who supported the communist Soviet Republic. Their success led to the removal of the pacifist and anarchist intellectuals who had previously been in control. A more radical government led by Eugen Leviné and Max Levien then took power.

The Bavarian Soviet Republic was overthrown in early May 1919 by forces of the Weimar Republic, clearing the way for Bavaria to become a constituent state of the German republic a few months later.

== Background ==
In the early weeks of the German revolution of 1918–1919, large-scale protests in Munich enabled Kurt Eisner, the leading representative of the Independent Social Democrats (USPD) in Bavaria, to declare the overthrow of the Kingdom of Bavaria and the establishment of the People's State of Bavaria. Eisner was elected its first minister-president by the Munich Workers' and Soldiers' Council and formed a provisional government made up of members of the USPD and the Social Democratic Party (SPD). In the state parliamentary elections of January 1919, Eisner and the USPD suffered a major defeat. While he was on his way to the parliament building to resign on 21 February 1919, he was assassinated by the völkisch and antisemitic Anton Graf von Arco auf Valley.

In March, the state parliament elected Johannes Hoffmann (SPD) minister-president of a new minority government. On 7 April, inspired by the communist revolution in Hungary, opposition communists proclaimed the Bavarian Soviet Republic, and the playwright Ernst Toller was appointed head of state. Hoffmann and the majority of his cabinet fled to Bamberg in northern Bavaria.

== The putsch ==
Alfred Seyffertitz, commander of the Bavarian Republican Defense Troop, a volunteer militia originally formed to oust Eisner, immediately began to make plans to overthrow the Bavarian Soviet Republic. He visited Johannes Hoffmann in Bamberg on 10 and 11 April 1919 and was formally commissioned to carry out a coup against the Soviet Republic. At dawn on Palm Sunday 13 April 1919, the Republican Defense Troop broke into the rooms of the Central Council of the Soviet Republic in the Wittelsbach Palace in Munich and arrested 13 people, including 8 members of the Central Council. Important decision-makers including Ernst Toller, Gustav Landauer and leading politicians of the Communist Party of Germany (KPD), were able to evade arrest. The KPD politicians called for immediate street protests.

Seyffertitz's expectation that regular army troops in Munich would join his campaign was not fulfilled. In the hope of receiving reinforcements from outside, the Republican Defense Troop occupied Munich's central train station. There they were besieged by revolutionary militiamen of the Munich Red Army under its commander, Rudolf Egelhofer. Fighting ensued in which 20 men were killed. At around 9 p.m. Seyffertitz gave up the battle and set off for Eichstätt by train with his remaining men.

== Aftermath ==
On the afternoon of the fighting, the communist leadership of the Bavarian Soviet Republic had called for a meeting of the workers' and soldiers' councils at Munich's Hofbräuhaus. There Eugen Leviné proposed that Toller's government be dissolved by a vote of the councils and that it be replaced by a new action committee dominated by hardline communists. The councils' vote to approve the motion, together with the communists' military victory, meant that the immediate effect of the putsch was not the overthrow of the Bavarian Soviet Republic but a new and more radically leftist government under Leviné.

In early May 1919, soldiers of the German Army aided by units of the Freikorps overthrew the Bavarian Soviet Republic at the cost of over 600 lives. The Hoffmann government was reinstated, and in August 1919 the republican Free State of Bavaria was established as a constituent member of the Weimar Republic.

== Bibliography ==
- Allan Mitchell: Revolution in Bayern 1918/1919. Die Eisner-Regierung und die Räterepublik. Beck, München 1967, 2. Auflage 1982, ISBN 3-406-02003-8 (S. 277 f.)
- Bracher, Karl Dietrich (1970) The German Dictatorship. Steinberg, Jean (translator). New York: Penguin Books. ISBN 0-14-013724-6
- Burleigh, Michael (2000) The Third Reich: A New History, New York: Hill and Wang, p. 40 ISBN 0-8090-9325-1
- Gaab, Jeffrey S. (2006). Munich: Hofbräuhaus & History: Beer, Culture, and Politics. Peter Lang / International Academic Publishers. ISBN 978-0820486062.
- Kershaw, Ian (1999) Hitler: 1889–1936 Hubris, New York: W. W. Norton & Company. ISBN 0-393-04671-0
- Mitcham, Samuel W. Jr. (1996), Why Hitler? The Genesis of the Nazi Reich, Westport, Connecticut: Praeger, ISBN 0-275-95485-4
