= Rosa Meyer-Leviné =

German communist activist and writer

Rosa Meyer-Leviné (nee Broido, 1890–1979) was a German communist activist and writer. She was the widow of Eugen Leviné and Ernst Meyer.

== Background and career ==
Rosa Broido was born in Gródek, the daughter of a rabbi. After her father's death she moved to Vienna and then Heidelberg, where she met Leviné in 1915. They had a child together and moved to Munich in 1918.

After Leviné was executed for his role in the Bavarian Soviet Republic, she was expelled from Munich, moving first to Heidelberg and then Berlin. In Berlin she was active in the Communist Party of Germany (KPD) and worked as an interpreter and publicist. She married Ernst Meyer, a KPD leader, in 1922.

Meyer died of tuberculosis in 1930. In 1933, Meyer-Leviné left Germany for England to escape the Nazi regime.

She broke with Stalin and the Communist Party after the Moscow trials of 1938 but remained a believer in communism until her death. She continued to work as a political journalist after the Second World War.

She returned to Heidelberg for a time in the 1960s but otherwise remained in England until her death in 1979.

Meyer-Leviné knew many prominent figures in the twentieth-century European left, both before and after World War II, including Vladimir Lenin, Leon Trotsky, Karl Radek, Eric Hobsbawm, Erich Fried and Rudi Dutschke.

== Books ==
- Aus der Münchener Rätezeit. Vereinigung Internationaler Verlags-Anstalten, 1925.
- Leviné: The Life of a Revolutionary. Introduction by Eric Hobsbawm. Saxon House, 1973.
- Inside German Communism: Memoirs of Party Life in the Weimar Republic. Pluto Press, 1977.

== Sources ==
Howald, Stefan. "A tangled web: Stuart Hood, Rosa Meyer-Leviné and Renée Goddard"
