= Ernst Meyer (German politician) =

German politician (1887–1930)

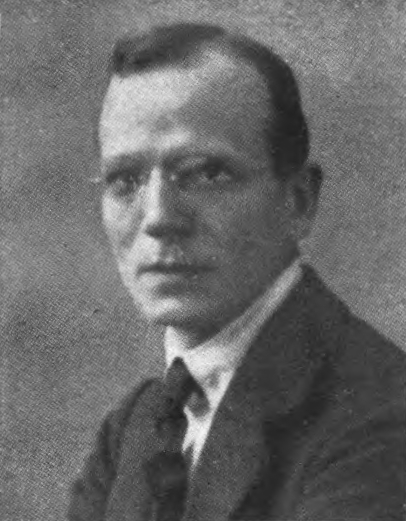
- Meyer c. 1921

Chairman of the Communist Party of Germany
- In office August 1921 – August 1922
- Preceded by: Heinrich Brandler; Walter Stoecker
- Succeeded by: Heinrich Brandler

Member of the Landtag of Prussia for East Prussia
- In office 14 June 1928 – 2 February 1930
- Preceded by: Multi-member district
- Succeeded by: Multi-member district
- In office 10 March 1921 – 5 January 1925
- Preceded by: Multi-member district
- Succeeded by: Multi-member district

Personal details
- Born: 10 July 1887 Prostken, East Prussia, Kingdom of Prussia, German Empire
- Died: 2 February 1930 (aged 42) Potsdam, Province of Brandenburg, Free State of Prussia, Weimar Republic
- Party: SPD (1908–1919); KPD (after 1919)
- Other political affiliations: Spartacus League (1914–1918)
- Spouse: Rosa Leviné (m. 1922)
- Children: 2
- Education: University of Königsberg (PhD)
- Occupation: Politician; Journalist
- Central institution membership: 1920–1923, 1927–1929: Full member, KPD Politburo; 1927–1929: Full member, KPD Central Committee; 1919–1923: Full member, KPD Zentrale

Ernst Meyer (10 July 1887 – 2 February 1930) was a German communist politician, journalist and activist who served as chairman of the Communist Party of Germany (KPD) from 1921 to 1922, during the united front period. A founding member and leading functionary of the KPD, he later served as leader of that party's faction in the Prussian Landtag. A political opponent of Ernst Thälmann, Meyer was removed from the party's Central Committee and Politburo in 1929 following the Wittorf Affair, not long before his death of tuberculosis-related pneumonia at the age of 42.

== Early life ==
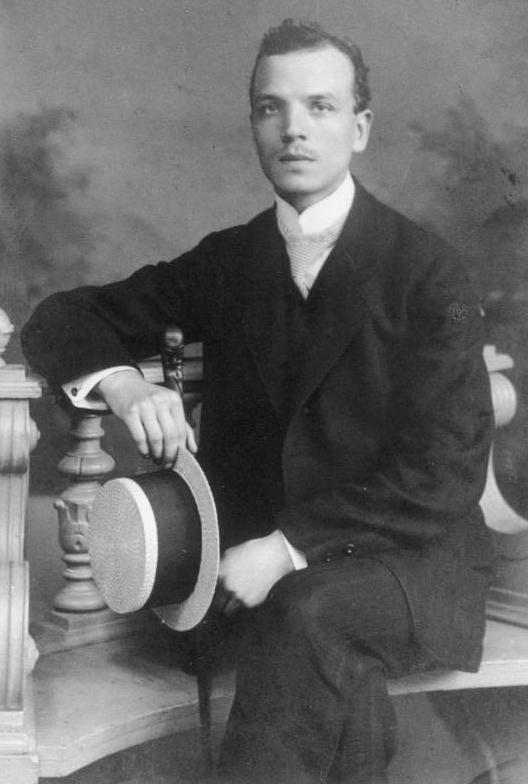
Meyer in 1905

Ernst Meyer was born in Prostken, East Prussia on 10 July 1887, to a religiously devout working-class family. He was able to attend Realschule despite financial troubles. He then studied economics, philosophy and psychology at the University of Königsberg, from which he received a PhD in 1910.

== Political career ==
Originally opposed to socialism, Meyer was converted after studying the ideology in preparation for a counter-presentation against Hugo Haase in 1907. Meyer joined the Social Democratic Party of Germany (SPD) in 1908, while he was still a student in college, beginning to write almost immediately for Vorwärts (Forward), the SPD's official daily newspaper. Meyer was promoted to the position of economics editor for the paper in 1911, and again to political editor in 1913.

=== First World War ===
Upon the outbreak of World War I, Meyer aligned himself with the extreme left of the SPD in opposition to the war, along with Rosa Luxemburg, Karl Liebknecht, Franz Mehring, and Clara Zetkin. He was a close political friend of Leo Jogiches and participated in the issuance of the letters and leaflets of the Spartakusbund (Spartacus League). Meyer remained the only Spartacist on the editorial board of Vorwärts and he attempted to resist efforts by the majority of the editorial board to support German efforts in the war. This discordant position made Meyer a target of the SPD's right wing, and on 15 April 1915 he was removed from his position on the paper's editorial board.

Meyer was a delegate of the Spartacus League to the Zimmerwald Conference in 1915, one of five Germans from three political groups to participate. Meyer and his Spartacist comrade, Bertha Thalheimer, did not support the resolution of the Zimmerwald Left demanding an immediate break of revolutionary socialists from the reformist wing of the Social Democratic movement. Meyer also served as a delegate to the Zimmerwald movement's second conference, held at Kienthal the following year.

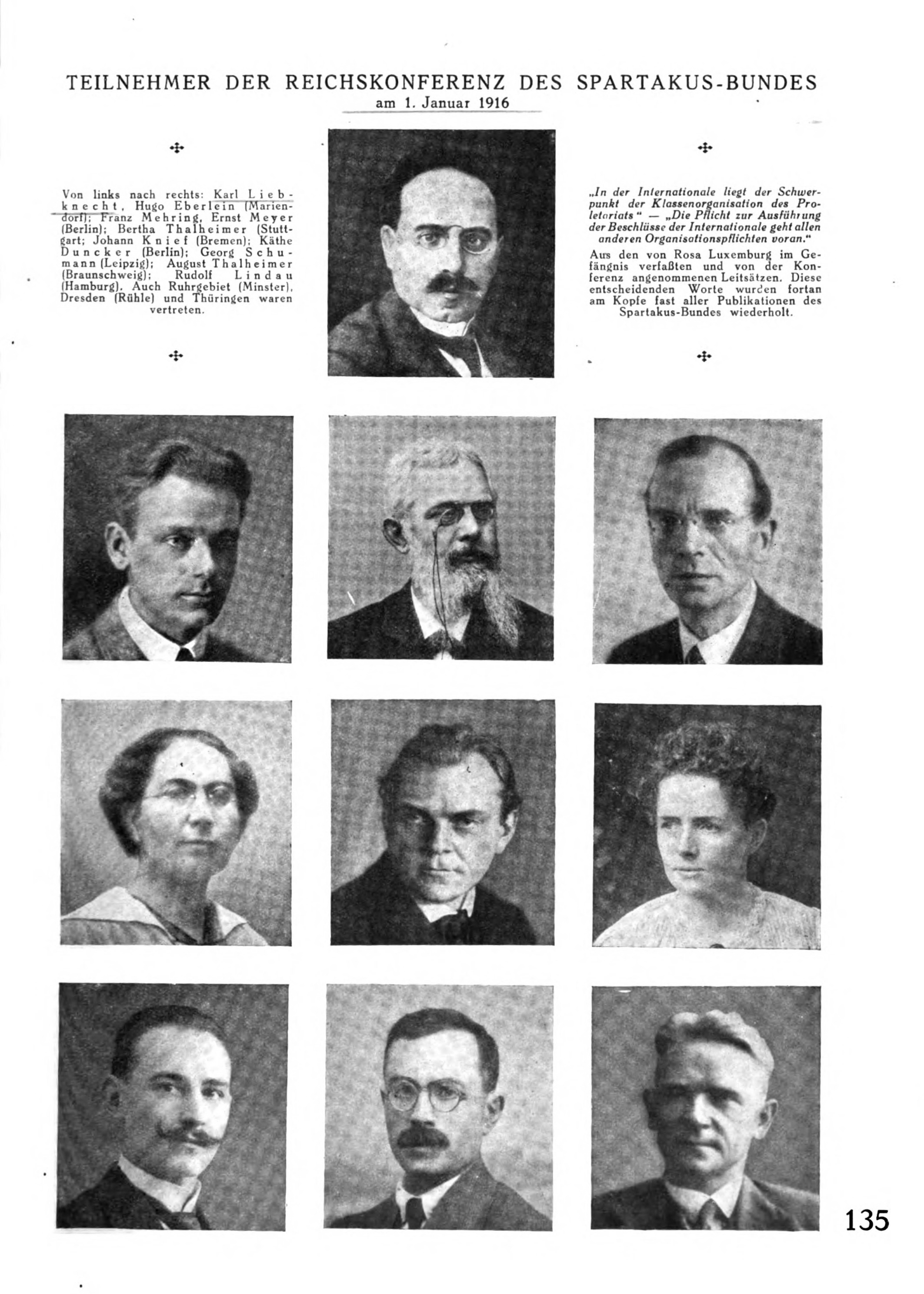
Meyer (second row, right) among participants of the Reich Conference of the Spartacus League, 1 January 1916

Meyer was arrested twice during the war, and following the trial of Karl Liebknecht for his anti-war activities in 1916, Meyer went into hiding together with his comrades Luxemburg and Mehring. During this time Meyer conducted experimental psychological studies on war veterans in Nuremberg, and in 1918 he became head of the Russian Telegraph Agency in Berlin.

=== German Revolution ===
Following the German Revolution in November 1918, Meyer and his colleagues were able to come out fo hiding. At the end of the year, the Spartacus League merged with other radical groups to form the Communist Party of Germany (KPD). Meyer was a founding member and was elected one of the twelve members of the Zentrale (Central Committee) of the new organization. He served on the editorial board of Die Rote Fahne (The Red Flag), the official organ of the KPD.

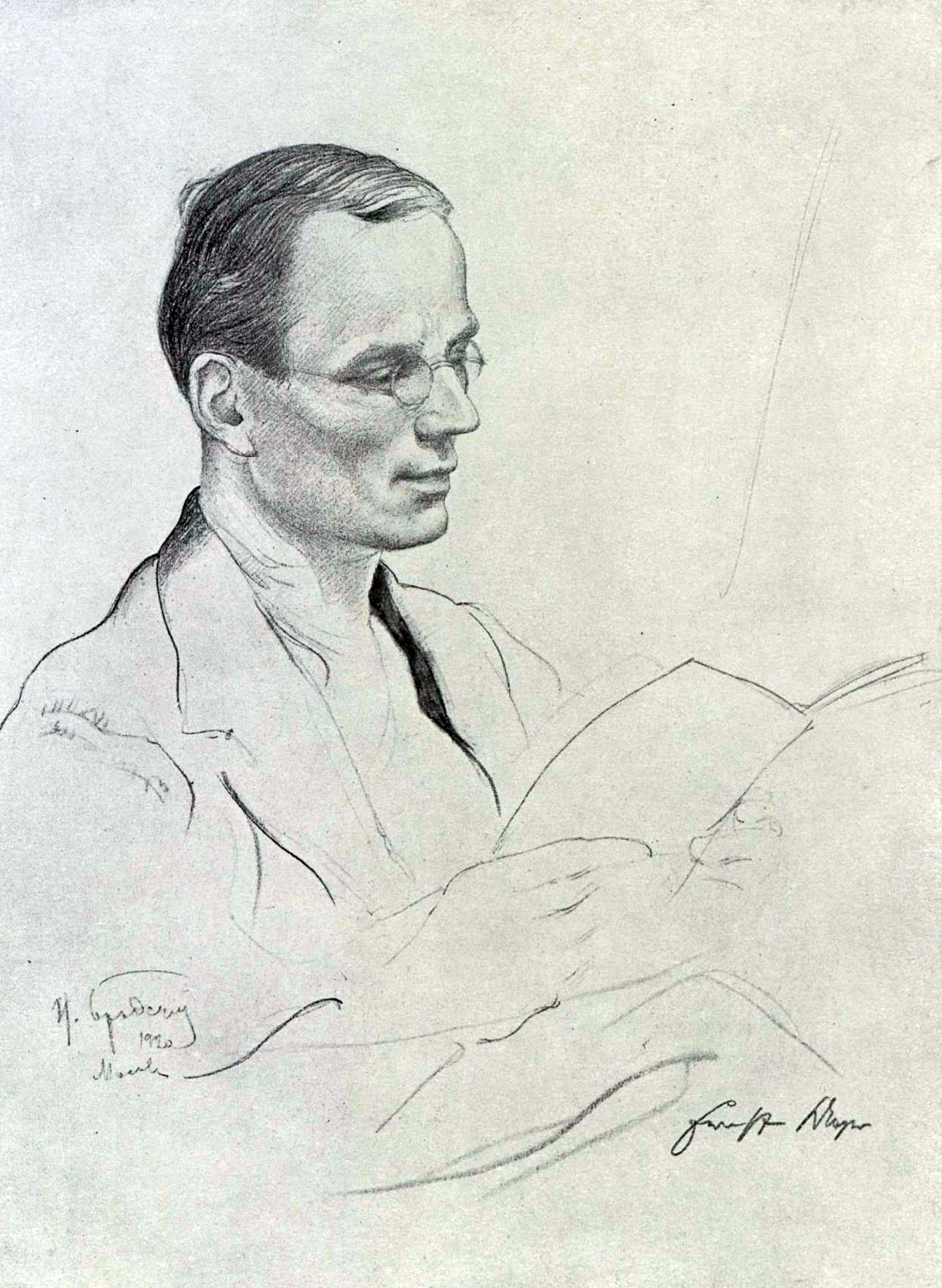
Portrait of Meyer at the 2nd World Congress of the Comintern by Isaak Brodsky, 1920

In 1920 Meyer was re-elected to the Zentrale and was made a member of the party's Politburo. The summer of that same year he attended the 2nd World Congress of the Communist International in Moscow as a representative of the KPD. Meyer reported on the agrarian question to the 2nd Congress, which elected him to the Executive Committee of the Communist International (ECCI) and its Presidium.

In the 1921 Prussian state election, Meyer was elected to the Landtag representing the East Prussia district. He was not a candidate in the 1924 election, but in 1928 he was again elected, serving until his death. During his first term, he acted as chairman of the KPD group in the Landtag.

=== Party chairman ===
At the August 1921 congress of the KPD, Meyer delivered the keynote speech, the political report of the Zentrale, and was elected chairman of the party, replacing Heinrich Brandler. Meyer became one of the main architects of the "united front" tactics in Germany. The change in policy was a reflection on the failed March Action in 1921, based on "offensive" tactics. Instead of isolated uprisings, the KPD now sought to build a mass base.

Following the assassination of Walther Rathenau, the KPD came to an agreement with the SPD, the Independent Social Democratic Party of Germany (USPD), the General German Trade Union Federation (ADGB), and the General Federation of Free Employees (AFA) to defend the republic, purge monarchists from the military, police and courts, disarm right-wing paramilitaries, and secure a political amnesty. Following a mass demonstration in support of these demands, in which protestors clashed with the police, the SPD withdrew from the agreement and sought to enact the demands solely through the Reichstag. To do so they negotiated with more moderate parties, and the bill they ended up passing targeted the KPD more than monarchists. The failure of this campaign led to the Comintern removing Meyer as party chairman, returning Brandler to the position in August 1922.

=== Later career ===
Meyer returned to Moscow in 1922 as a member of the German delegation to the 4th World Congress of the Comintern. That year, he married party activist Rosa Leviné (Eugen Leviné's widow).

Meyer again delivered the key political report to the KPD's January 1923 party congress, but this time he was not re-elected to the Central Committee. He nevertheless remained an important member of the KPD, returning to the party's higher echelons after a further factional shift in 1925.

In the spring of 1926 Meyer attended the 6th Enlarged Plenum of the Comintern, although he faced personal criticism in that body's discussion of the German question. He returned in November to participate in the 7th Enlarged Plenum of the CI.

Meyer was re-elected to the Central Committee and its Politburo by the 1927 congress of the KPD. He was one of the leaders of the Conciliator faction and a political opponent of chairman Ernst Thälmann. When Thälmann secured his position in the party following the Wittorf affair in 1928, it effectively spelled the end of Meyer's political career.

Meyer addressed the KPD's 12th Congress in June 1929, but he was removed of all party functions.

== Death and legacy ==
In the winter of 1929–30 Meyer, who had long suffered from tuberculosis, contracted a case of pneumonia. He died on 2 February 1930 at the age of 43 in Potsdam.

At the time of his death Meyer's comrade Paul Frölich remembered Meyer as a "very cool, sober, and deliberate thinker" who was valued for these characteristics during debates over party policies and tactics.
