= Hoppla, We're Alive! =

1927 German play by Ernst Toller

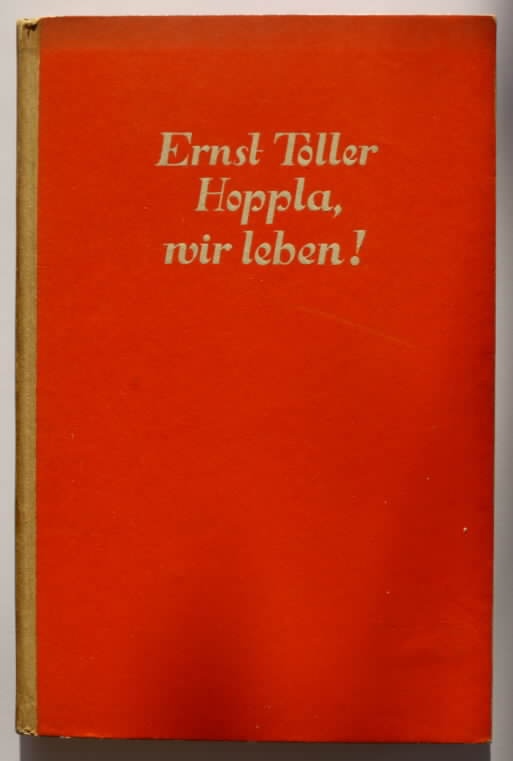
- Original German book cover, 1927
- Written by: Ernst Toller
- Original language: German
- Genre: New Objectivity

Premiere
- Date premiered: 1 September 1927

Hoppla, We're Alive! (German: Hoppla, wir leben!) is a Neue Sachlichkeit (or "New Objectivity") play by the German playwright Ernst Toller. Its second production, directed by the seminal epic theatre director Erwin Piscator in 1927, was a milestone in the history of theatre. The British playwright Mark Ravenhill based his Some Explicit Polaroids (1999) on Toller's play.

== Characters ==
=== Prologue ===
Time: 1919

Karl Thomas	Eva Berg	Wilhelm Kilman
Albert Kroll	Frau Meller	Warder Randrow
Lieutenant Baron Friedrich	Soldiers	

=== Main play ===
This piece takes place in many countries, eight years after the crushing of a people's uprising. Time: 1927

Karl Thomas	Eva Berg	Wilhelm Kilman
Frau Kilman	Lotte Kilman	Rand
Professor Lundin	Albert Kroll	Frau Meller
Rand	Professor Lundin	Fritz
Grete	Count Lande	Minister of War
Banker	Banker's Son	Pickel
Baron Friedrich	Ministry Official	Madhouse Orderly
Student	1st Worker	2nd Worker
3rd Worker	4th Worker	5th Worker
Examining Magistrate	Head Waiter	Porter
Radio Operator	Busboy	Police Chief
1st Policeman	2nd Policeman	3rd Policeman
Chairman of the Union of Intellectual Brain Workers	Philosopher X	Poet Y
Critic Z	Election officer	2nd Election Officer
1st Electioneer	2nd Electioneer	3rd Electioneer
Voter	Old Woman	Prisoner N
Journalist	Ladies, Gentlemen	People

== Reception ==
According to theatre critic Eric Bentley’s book The Playwright as Thinker, when Erwin Piscator directed the premiere of Hoppla, We’re Alive! in 1927 and Frau Meller, the mother in the play, said "There’s only one thing to do: either hang one’s self [sic] or change the world," the youthful audience burst spontaneously into the Internationale.

Hoppla, We're Alive! was one of the books burned in the infamous Nazi book burning, along with 20,000 other left-wing and Jewish books.

== Sources ==
- Bentley, Eric. 1987. The Playwright as Thinker: A Study of Drama in Modern Times. Revised ed. San Diego: Harcourt, Brace, Jovanovich. ISBN 0-15-672041-8.
- Pearlman, Alan Raphael, ed. and trans. 2000. Plays One: Transformation, Masses Man, Hoppla, We're Alive!. By Ernst Toller. Absolute Classics ser. London: Oberon. ISBN 1-84002-195-0.
