= German corvette Hiddensee =

East German Navy ship

Coordinates: 41.7062°N 71.1629°W

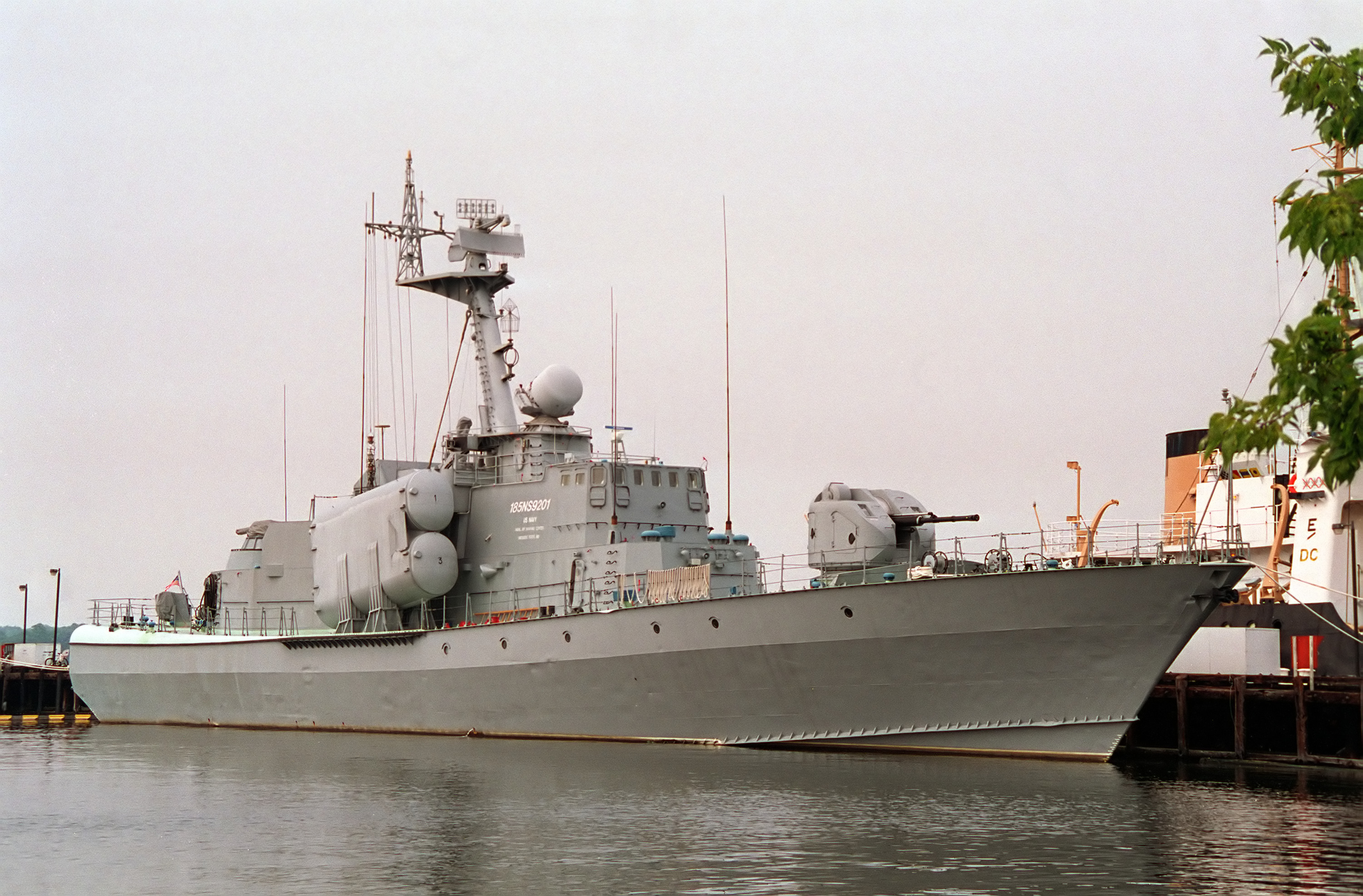
- Hiddensee in US Navy service

History

East Germany
- Name: Rudolf Egelhofer
- Namesake: Rudolf Egelhofer
- Builder: Petrovsky Shipyard, Almaz Shipbuilding Company, Leningrad
- Laid down: 1984
- Commissioned: 1985
- Fate: Transferred to unified German navy, 1990

Germany
- Name: Hiddensee (P6166)
- Namesake: Hiddensee
- Acquired: 1990
- Decommissioned: April 1991
- Fate: Transferred to United States, November 1991

United States
- Name: USNS Hiddensee (185NS9201)
- Acquired: November 1991
- Commissioned: 14 February 1992
- Decommissioned: 18 April 1996
- Fate: Museum ship from 14 June 1997; Scrapped in October 2023

General characteristics
- Class & type: Tarantul-class corvette
- Displacement: 480 long tons (488 t) standard; 540 long tons (549 t) full load
- Length: 56 m (183 ft 9 in)
- Beam: 10.50 m (34 ft 5 in)
- Draught: 2.50 m (8 ft 2 in)
- Propulsion: COGOG; 2 × DR077 12,000 hp (8,948 kW) gas turbines; 2 × DM076 4,000 hp (2,983 kW) gas turbines
- Speed: 42 knots (78 km/h; 48 mph)
- Range: 1,650 nmi (3,060 km; 1,900 mi) at 14 knots (26 km/h; 16 mph)
- Endurance: 10 days
- Complement: 50
- Armament: 1 × 76 mm AK-176 dual purpose main gun; 2 × AK-630 30 mm gatling guns; 4 × KT-138E P-15 Termit (SS-N-2 Styx) anti-ship missile launchers; 1 × quad FAM-14 Strela 2 (SA-N-5) surface-to-air missile launcher; 2 × PK-16 chaff launchers

Hiddensee was a Tarantul-class corvette. Originally a Soviet naval warship, the corvette was transferred first to the East German navy, then to the new unified German Navy, and ended her career in the United States as a non-commissioned naval ship. After decommissioning, she was later part of the Battleship Cove site at Fall River, Massachusetts as a museum ship, before being scrapped in 2023.

== Ship history ==
The Tarantul I-class missile corvette was launched in 1984 at the Petrovsky Shipyard of Almaz Shipbuilding Company in Leningrad, Russian SFSR. She was commissioned in 1985 by the East German Volksmarine as Rudolf Egelhofer, but after the reunification of Germany in 1990, she was transferred to the German Navy and renamed Hiddensee.

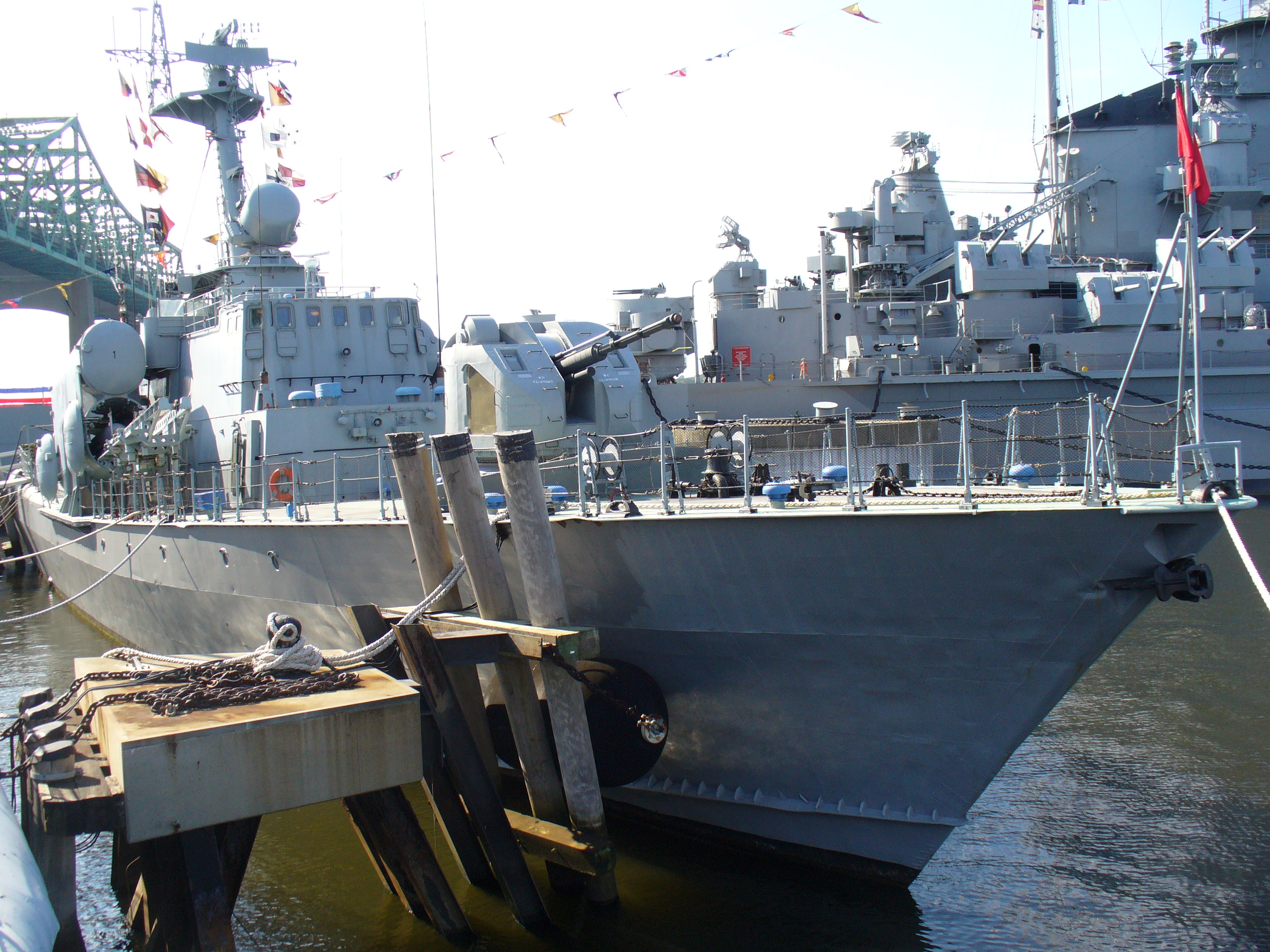
Hiddensee as a museum ship

After decommissioning in April 1991, she was transferred to the United States Navy. As USNS Hiddensee (185NS9201), the ship was extensively evaluated at the Naval Air Warfare Center at Solomons, Maryland, and used for naval exercises. Following naval budget cuts, the ship was removed from service in April 1996, and joined the Battleship Cove fleet on 14 June 1997.

Battleship Cove could not look after her due to lack of funding. Her hull deteriorated until the decision was made to remove her from the collection. She was quietly towed off to be scrapped in Bridgeport, Connecticut in early October 2023. The decision to scrap the ship came as a result of significant deterioration in the ship's hull, which would have necessitated a costly dry docking to repair. Chris Nardi, the chief operating officer for Battleship Cove, also noted that "The Hiddensee, as designed by the Russian shipyard [...] they were designed to be definitely disposable in terms of the way they were constructed", which also militated against trying to repair the vessel. In addition, two other vessels owned by the group, the submarine Lionfish and the destroyer Joseph P. Kennedy Jr. were already undergoing repairs at the time the decision was made.
