= Bavarian Soviet Republic =

1919 unrecognized socialist state in Germany

Coordinates: 48°08′N 11°34′E

Bavarian Soviet Republic Münchner Räterepublik
- 1919
- Flag
- Motto: "Proletarier aller Länder, vereinigt Euch!" "Workers of the world, unite!"
- Anthem: Die Internationale; The Internationale
- Territory claimed by the Bavarian Soviet Republic (in red) shown with the rest of the Weimar Republic (in beige)
- Status: Unrecognized state
- Capital: Munich
- Common languages: German
- Government: Soviet republic
  - 6–12 April 1919: Ernst Toller
  - 12 April 1919 – 3 May 1919: Eugen Leviné
- Historical era: Interwar period · Revolutions of 1917–1923 · Political violence in Germany (1918–1933)
  - Established: 6 April 1919
  - Disestablished: 3 May 1919
- Currency: Mark (ℳ)
Preceded by	Succeeded by
People's State of Bavaria	Free State of Bavaria (Weimar Republic)
- Today part of: Germany

The Bavarian Soviet Republic, also known as Bavarian Council Republic or the Munich Soviet Republic (German: Räterepublik Baiern, Münchner Räterepublik), was a short-lived unrecognised socialist state in Bavaria during the German revolution of 1918–1919.

A group of communists and anarchists declared the Bavarian Soviet Republic on 6 April 1919, forcing the government of the existing Free State of Bavaria to flee to Bamberg in northern Bavaria. The members of the new government, led by playwright Ernst Toller, had no political or administrative experience, and after just six days in power they were ousted in a putsch organized by the Communist Party of Germany (KPD). The new head of state, the Russian-German Bolshevik Eugen Leviné, quickly instituted communist measures such as worker control of factories. Food shortages led to popular unrest, and on 3 May the Soviet Republic was put down by soldiers of the German Army supported by paramilitary Freikorps troops. Some 600 people died in the fighting. On 14 August 1919, the republican Free State of Bavaria resumed control over all of Bavaria.

== Background ==
The roots of the Bavarian Soviet Republic lay in the German Empire's defeat in the First World War and the ensuing German revolution of 1918–1919. Faced with demonstrations and growing unrest in Munich, King Ludwig III of Bavaria fled the city on 7 November 1918. Kurt Eisner of the left-wing Independent Social Democratic Party (USPD), with the support of local revolutionary workers' and soldiers' councils, then became minister-president of the newly proclaimed Free State of Bavaria. In January, Bavarian voters elected a Landtag (parliament) to draft a republican constitution for Bavaria. On 21 February 1919, the day of the Landtag's first meeting, Eisner was assassinated by a right-wing extremist while on his way to the assembly. After a period during which the workers' councils attempted to form a new government, the Landtag met again on 17 March and chose Johannes Hoffmann of the moderate Social Democratic Party as the new minister-president. He then put together a minority cabinet to govern Bavaria along with the Landtag.

== First Toller government ==
On the night of 6–7 April 1919, communists and anarchists, energised by the news of a communist revolution in Hungary, declared a soviet republic, with Ernst Toller as chief of state. Toller called on the non-existent Bavarian Red Army to support the new dictatorship of the proletariat and ruthlessly deal with any counter-revolutionary behaviour. The KPD reluctantly took part in the newly formed soviet republic, although the party's chairman, Paul Levi, denounced the republic as "revolutionary adventurism".

The Hoffmann government fled Munich and took its seat in Bamberg in northern Bavaria.

Initially, the Bavarian Soviet Republic was ruled by USPD members such as Ernst Toller and anarchists like writer Gustav Landauer, economist Silvio Gesell and playwright Erich Mühsam. Toller, who was also a playwright, described the revolution as the "Bavarian Revolution of Love". Among the café society of Schwabing, the new government became known as "the regime of the coffeehouse anarchists".

Toller's cabinet picks were controversial. For instance, a burglar with a conviction for moral turpitude was chosen as police president of Munich. Most infamous was the Commissar of Foreign Affairs Franz Lipp, who had been admitted several times to psychiatric hospitals. He declared war on Württemberg and Switzerland over the Swiss refusal to lend 60 locomotives to the Republic. He claimed to be well acquainted with Pope Benedict XV and informed Lenin and the Pope by cable that the ousted former Minister-President Hoffmann had fled to Bamberg and taken the key to the ministry toilet with him.

Toller's brief government was characterized by bold declarations without real enforcement. The minister for public housing published a decree saying that no house could thereafter contain more than three rooms and that the living room must always be above the kitchen and bedroom. It was also declared that Finance Minister Silvio Gesell's concept of Freigeld (lit. 'free money') would be implemented, although it never was.

Members of the Toller cabinet were:

Portfolio	Minister	Took office	Left office	Party
President	Ernst Toller		Incumbent	USPD
Foreign Minister	Franz Lipp		Incumbent	USPD
Finance Minister	Silvio Gesell		Incumbent	Independent
Interior Minister	Fritz Soldmann		Incumbent	USPD
Minister of Military Affairs	Wilhelm Reichart		Incumbent	KPD
Minister of Transportation	Gustav Paulukum		Incumbent	USPD
Minister of Education	Gustav Landauer		Incumbent	USPD
Minister of Welfare	August Hagemeister		Incumbent	USPD
Minister of Justice	Konrad Kübler		Incumbent	BB
Ministry of Social Welfare	Martin Steiner		Incumbent	BB

== Eugen Leviné government ==
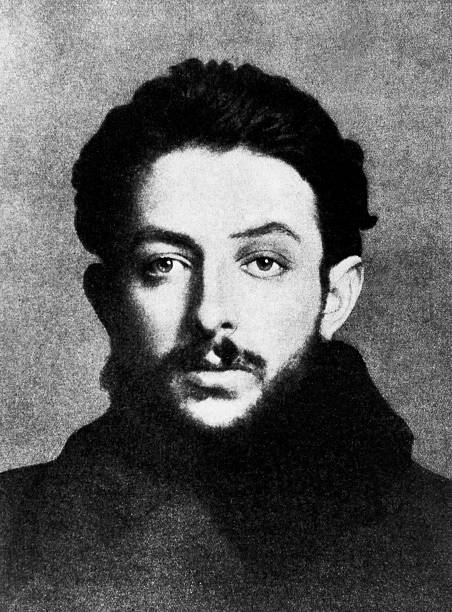
Eugen Leviné, head of the second and more radical government of the Bavarian Soviet Republic

On Saturday 12 April 1919, only six days into Toller's regime, the KPD seized power, led by three Russian-German Bolsheviks, with Eugen Leviné as head of state and Max Levien as the chairman of the Bavarian KPD. The communists managed to secure power after the Palm Sunday Putsch, when the Bavarian Red Army – which consisted of factory workers and members of the workers' and soldiers' councils under the command of Rudolf Egelhofer – defeated the Bavarian militia forces of the Republican Defense Troop. Twenty men died in the fighting.

Having received the blessings of Lenin – who at the annual May Day celebration in Red Square said: "The liberated working class is celebrating its anniversary not only in Soviet Russia but in [...] Soviet Bavaria" – Leviné began to enact more communist reforms, which included forming a "Red Army" from factory workers, seizing cash, food supplies, and privately owned guns, expropriating luxurious apartments and giving them to the homeless, and placing factories under the ownership and control of their workers. One of Munich's main churches was taken over and made into a revolutionary temple which would be presided over by "Goddess Reason". Bavaria was to be in the vanguard of the Bolshevization of Central Europe, with all workers to receive military training.

Leviné also had plans to abolish paper money and reform the education system, but he did not have time to implement them. There was time, however, for Max Levien, following Lenin's orders, to arrest aristocrats and members of the middle class as hostages.

During Leviné's short reign, food shortages quickly became a problem, especially the absence of milk. Public criticism over the milk shortage turned political, precipitating the communist government to publicly declare: "What does it matter? [...] Most of it goes to the children of the bourgeoisie anyway. We are not interested in keeping them alive. No harm if they die – they'd only grow into enemies of the proletariat."

== Second Ernst Toller government ==
On 27 April, due to disputes over whether negotiations should be held with the Hoffmann government, Leviné's committee resigned and re-elected Toller to lead the Bavarian Soviet Republic.

The rival governments – Hoffmann's seated in Bamberg and the Bavarian Soviet Republic located in Munich – clashed militarily at Dachau on 18 April when Hoffmann's 8,000 soldiers met the Soviet Republic's 30,000. The BSR forces led by Ernst Toller were victorious in the first battle at Dachau, but Hoffmann made a deal that gave him the services of 20,000 men of the Freikorps under Lt. General Burghard von Oven. Oven and the Freikorps, along with loyalist elements of the German Army – called the "White Guards of Capitalism" by the communists – then took Dachau and surrounded Munich. In the meantime, supporters of the BSR had occupied the rooms of the Thule Society in the Hotel Vier Jahreszeiten on 26 April and arrested Countess Hella von Westarp, the society's secretary, and six others, who were to be held as hostages. Rudolf Egelhofer, had these seven and three other hostages executed on 30 April. They included the well-connected Prince Gustav of Thurn and Taxis. The executions were carried out despite Toller's efforts to prevent them.

The Freikorps broke through the Munich defences on 1 May, leading to bitter street fighting that involved "flame-throwers, heavy artillery, armoured vehicles, even aircraft". At least 606 people were killed, of whom 335 were civilians. Leviné was later condemned to death for treason and shot by a firing squad in Stadelheim Prison. Gustav Landauer was killed by the Freikorps, and Egelhofer was murdered without trial after being arrested. Numerous others were given prison sentences, such as Toller (5 years) and the anarchist writer Erich Mühsam (15 years); others received longer sentences, 6,000 years' worth in all, some of it to hard labour.

General von Oven declared the city secured on 6 May, ending the reign of the Bavarian Soviet Republic. Although the Hoffmann government was restored, power in Munich had shifted to the right.

The republican Bamberg Constitution was enacted on 14 August 1919, creating the Free State of Bavaria as a constituent state of the new Weimar Republic.

== Aftermath ==
The tumultuous period of the Bavarian Soviet Republic created fear and hatred of "Bolshevism" in Bavarian society. The period during which the two states existed was popularly remembered as one of shortages, censorship, restrictions on freedom, violence and general disorder. The many separate strands of Bavarian conservatism found a common enemy in the far left, and Bavaria became profoundly "reactionary, anti-Republican, [and] counter-revolutionary". The fact that some of the prominent figures of the Soviet Republic were Jewish was used to push the conspiracy theory of "Jewish Bolshevism" in Bavaria.

== Notable people ==
One notable supporter of the Soviet Republic was the artist Georg Schrimpf, then aged 30, who was arrested when the movement was crushed. His friend, the writer Oskar Maria Graf, who was also arrested, wrote about the events in his 1927 autobiographical novel, Wir sind Gefangene (Prisoners All). The famed anarchist novelist Ret Marut (later known as B. Traven) was an active participant in the establishment of soviet power and worked as head of the Press Department of the Soviet Republic. During the early days of the Soviet Republic, representatives of cultural life also played an important role in the revolution. Some intellectuals such as the economist Lujo Brentano, the conductor Bruno Walter and the writers Heinrich Mann and Rainer Maria Rilke formed the Rat der geistigen Arbeit (Council of Intellectual Work) with Mann as its chairman.

According to biographer Ian Kershaw, Adolf Hitler's longstanding chauffeur and first leader of the Schutzstaffel (SS) Julius Schreck signed up and served as a member of the Red Army in late April 1919. Balthasar Brandmayer, one of Hitler's closest wartime friends, remarked "how he at first welcomed the end of the monarchies" and the establishment of the republic in Bavaria.

Active participants in the Freikorps units – those of Oven, Franz Ritter von Epp, and Hermann Erhardt – that suppressed the Bavarian Soviet Republic included future powerful members of the Nazi Party, including Rudolf Hess, a member of the Freikorps Epp.

In his 1952 memoir Witness, Whittaker Chambers named Eugen Leviné as one of three people whom he most admired as he joined the Communist Party USA, along with Felix Dzerzhinsky and Igor Sazonov:

During the Bavarian Soviet Republic in 1919, Leviné was the organiser of the Workers and Soldiers Soviets. When the Bavarian Soviet Republic was crushed, Leviné was captured and court martialed. The court-martial told him: "You are under sentence of death." Leviné answered: "We communists are always under sentence of death." That is another thing that it meant to be a Communist.

=== Hitler's role ===
Adolf Hitler was present in the Munich area at the time of the Bavarian Soviet Republic as part of the 16th Bavarian Reserve Infantry Regiment. He had been appointed a deputy battalion representative (deputy Vertrauensmann) for his army regiment on April 3 – before the soviet period – a position that was created by the German Army High Command; part of the duties of the role were education and propaganda. Although authors such as Ian Kershaw and others claim that Hitler held the role as early as February, it contradicts evidence put forth by Othmar Plöckinger in his book Unter Soldaten und Agitatoren ("Among Soldiers and Agitators"). The idea that Hitler attended Eisner's funeral and supported the Soviet Bavarian Republic originate with German journalist and documentarian Guido Knopp. (In 2004, a group of international historians warned that documentaries like the ones produced by Knopp could reduce important historic facts to mere infotainment.)

Hitler's unit and regiment declared themselves neutral and refused to join the Bavarian Red Army (an act of passive resistance) and was never part of the Soviet Republic. They did not give their allegiance to the new regime nor were they under its control. Author Sjoerd de Boer notes that there is no evidence of Hitler having aided the Soviet Republic personally, despite the claim of some authors. In fact, information originating from Hitler's barracks assisted the advancing Freikorps units in capturing the city. After the fighting ended, Hitler was part of a committee that prosecuted soldiers for aiding the soviet revolt. Hitler was next employed by the occupying "White" forces in the information bureau led by Captain Karl Mayr of Reichswehr Gruppen Kommando 4, which was responsible for countering soviet activity. Mayr had likely been impressed by Hitler's role on the prosecuting committee, making it extremely unlikely that he would have brought him on had he been involved with the soviet forces. In order to prevent the troops in his barracks from joining the Red Army in 1919, Hitler was recorded as saying "we are no Revolutionary Guard for a gang of vagrant Jews!”

Certain authors have argued that Hitler was in attendance at Kurt Eisner's funeral. A separate photo and video have been used as evidence that he was: in a photograph, a man purported to be Hitler (based on physical appearance) is shown observing a memorial procession from the side while Russian prisoners of war carry a portrait of Eisner. In the footage of Eisner's funeral, another man (actually participating) is claimed to be Hitler. Historians debate about the authenticity of the claim, especially with regard to the graininess of the footage. Thomas Weber believes that Hitler did attend but concluded that it was impossible to know for sure; other historians dismiss the claim outright. Representatives of Hitler's unit were ordered to attend a memorial procession for Eisner, but that was on 3 April 1919, separate from the funeral in February. As of May 1919 Hitler was an informant for the Reichswehr. Author Peter den Hartog has concluded Hitler's attendance at Eisner's funeral can safely be considered a myth.

== See also ==
- Aftermath of World War I
- History of Bavaria
- Bremen Soviet Republic
- Soviet (council)

== Bibliography ==
- Riddell, John, ed. (1986). The German Revolution and the Debate on Soviet Power: Documents: 1918-1919 Preparing the Founding Congress. Pathfinder Press.
- Bartolf, Christian; Miething, Dominique (2019). "Gustav Landauer and the Revolutionary Principle of Non-violent Non-cooperation". In Kets, Gaard; Muldoon, James (eds.). The German Revolution and Political Theory. Palgrave Macmillan. pp. 215–236. doi:10.1007/978-3-030-13917-9_11. ISBN 978-3-030-13917-9. ISSN 2524-7131.
- Bracher, Karl Dietrich (1970). The German Dictatorship. Translated by Steinberg, Jean. New York: Penguin Books. p. 110. ISBN 0-14-013724-6.
- Bronner, Stephen Eric (2019). "Revolutionary Principles and Strategy in the November Revolution: The Case of the USPD". In Kets, Gaard; Muldoon, James (eds.). The German Revolution and Political Theory. Palgrave Macmillan. pp. 237–254. doi:10.1007/978-3-030-13917-9_12. ISBN 978-3-030-13917-9. ISSN 2524-7131.
- Burleigh, Michael (2000). The Third Reich: A New History. New York: Hill and Wang. ISBN 0-8090-9325-1.
- Evans, Richard J. (2003). The Coming of the Third Reich. New York: Penguin Books. ISBN 0-14-303469-3.
- Gaab, Jeffrey S. (2006). Munich: Hofbräuhaus & History: Beer, Culture, and Politics. Lausanne, Switzerland: Peter Lang. ISBN 978-0-820-48606-2.
- Hett, Benjamin Carter (2018). The Death of Democracy. New York: St. Martin's. ISBN 978-1-250-21086-9.
- Heynen, Robert (2019). "The German Revolution and the Radical Right". In Kets, Gaard; Muldoon, James (eds.). The German Revolution and Political Theory. Marx, Engels, and Marxisms. Palgrave Macmillan. pp. 45–68. doi:10.1007/978-3-030-13917-9_3. ISBN 978-3-030-13917-9. ISSN 2524-7131.
- Kershaw, Ian (1999). Hitler: 1889–1936 Hubris. New York: W. W. Norton & Company. ISBN 0-393-04671-0.
- Mitcham, Samuel W. Jr. (1996). Why Hitler? The Genesis of the Nazi Reich. Westport, Connecticut: Praeger. ISBN 0-275-95485-4.
- Mitchell, Allan [in German] (1982). Revolution in Bayern 1918/1919. Die Eisner-Regierung und die Räterepublik [Revolution in Bavaria 1918/1919. The Eisner government and the Soviet Republic] (in German) (2nd ed.). Munich: Beck. ISBN 3-406-02003-8.
