= Ernst Toller =

German author and revolutionary (1893–1939)

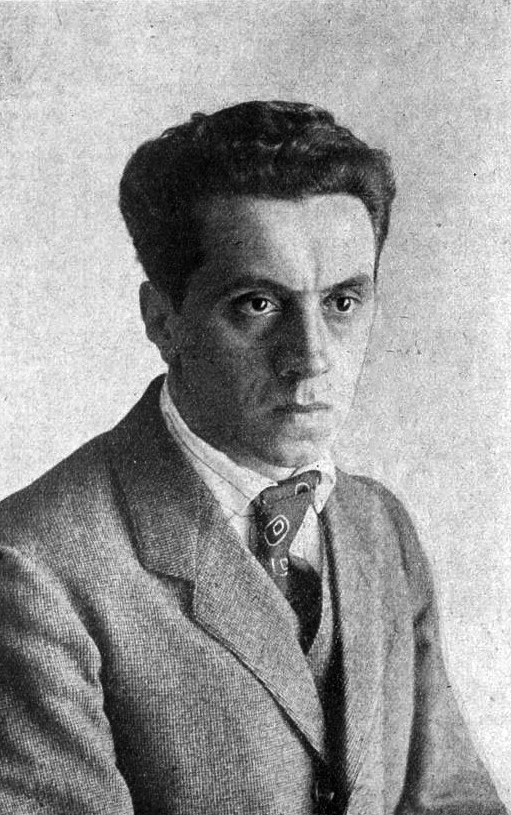
- Ernst Toller in 1923

President of the Bavarian Soviet Republic
- In office 6 April 1919 – 12 April 1919
- Preceded by: Office established
- Succeeded by: Eugen Leviné

Personal details
- Born: 1 December 1893 Samotschin, Posen, Germany
- Died: 22 May 1939 (aged 45) New York City, US
- Military career
- Branch: Imperial German Army
- Service years: 1914- 1915
- Conflicts: World War I German revolution

Ernst Toller (1 December 1893 – 22 May 1939) was a German author, playwright, left-wing politician, and revolutionary known for his Expressionist plays. He served for six days in 1919 as president of the short-lived Bavarian Soviet Republic, after which he became head of its army. He was imprisoned for five years for his part in the Bavarian Soviet Republic's armed resistance to the central government in Berlin. In prison, Toller wrote several plays that gained him international renown. They were performed in London, New York City, and Berlin.

In 1933 Toller was exiled from Germany after the Nazis came to power. He did a lecture tour in 1936–1937 in the United States and Canada, settling in California for a while before going to New York, where he joined other exiles. He died by suicide in 1939.

== Life and career ==
Toller was born in 1893 to a Jewish family in Samotschin, Germany (now Szamocin, Poland). He was the son of Ida (Kohn) and Max Toller, a pharmacist. His parents ran a general store.

At the outbreak of World War I, he volunteered for the German Army. After serving 13 months on the Western Front, he suffered a complete physical and psychological collapse. His first drama, Transformation (Die Wandlung, 1919), was wrought from his wartime experiences.

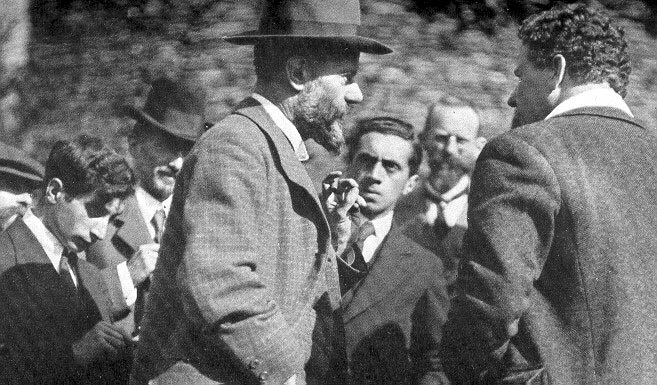
Ernst Toller (center) and Max Weber (foreground, bearded) in May 1917 at the Lauensteiner Tagung

Together with leading anarchists, such as B. Traven and Gustav Landauer, and Toller's party, the Independent Social Democratic Party of Germany (USPD), Toller was involved in the short-lived 1919 Bavarian Soviet Republic. At the time, the communists opposed the founding of a communist republic. Toller served as president from 6 to 12 April. Communists agitated against him and his councils and sent speakers into soldiers' barracks to announce that the Council Republic did not deserve to be defended. Toller issued numerous decrees, almost none of which were realised: the press was to be socialised, the mining industry to be socialised, and the eight-hour working day made legally binding. He decreed that citizens could withdraw only 100 marks per day from the banks, and assured workers that these measures were directed against the major capitalists who were attempting to take money abroad. A decree was made against exorbitant rents. His government members were not always well-chosen. Foreign Affairs Deputy Franz Lipp became known for his eccentricity: in particular, he informed Vladimir Lenin via cable that the former Minister-President Johannes Hoffmann had taken the key to the ministry toilet with him while fleeing to Bamberg. On 13 April 1919, the Communist Party seized power, with Eugen Leviné as their leader. In May 1919, the republic was defeated by the Freikorps.

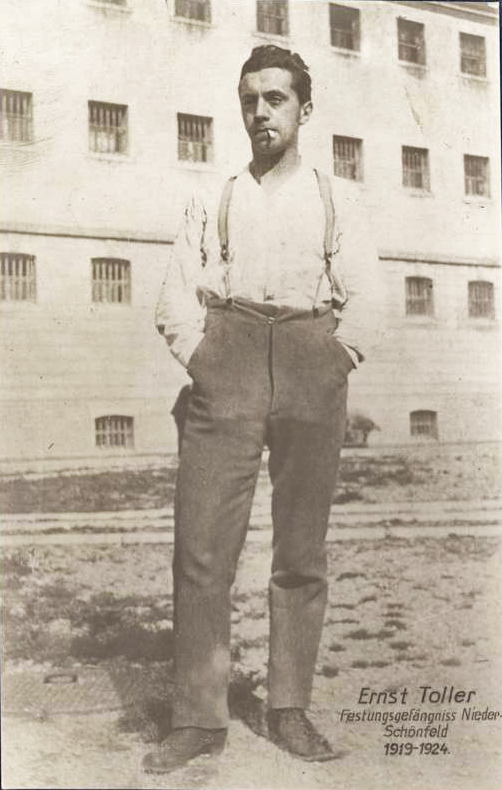
Ernst Toller during his imprisonment in the Niederschönenfeld fortress (early 1920s)

The authors Max Weber and Thomas Mann testified on Toller's behalf when he was tried for his part in the revolution. He was sentenced to five years in prison and served his sentence in Stadelheim, Neuburg, and Eichstätt. From February 1920 until his release, he spent most of his time in the fortress of Niederschönenfeld, where he spent 149 days in solitary confinement and 24 days on hunger strike.

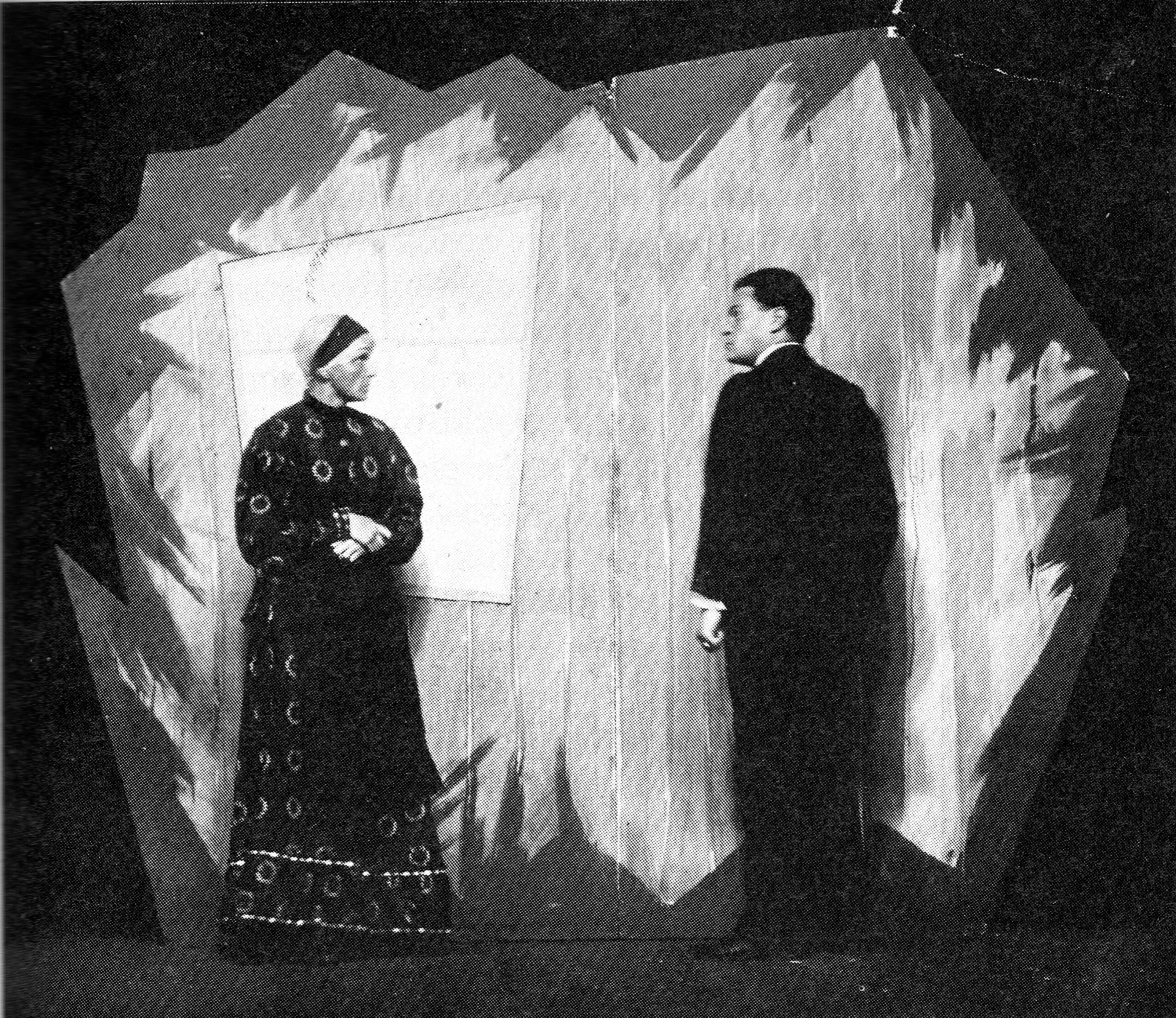
Karlheinz Martin's production of Transformation in Berlin with Fritz Kortner as the war returnee, 30 September 1919

Toller did not see the plays he wrote in prison performed until after his release in July 1925. The most famous of his later dramas, Hoppla, We're Alive! (Hoppla, wir Leben!), directed by Erwin Piscator, premiered in Berlin in 1924. It depicts a revolutionary discharged from a mental hospital after eight years who discovers that his former comrades have grown complacent and compromised in the system they once opposed. He kills himself in despair.

== Exile, death and legacy ==
Two of Toller's early plays were produced in New York in the 1930s: The Machine Wreckers (1922), whose opening night in 1937 Toller attended, and No More Peace, produced in 1937 by the Federal Theatre Project and presented in New York City in 1938. Their sense of immediacy was gone: the first play was related to World War I and its aftermath, and the second an earlier period of the Nazis' rise. Their style was outmoded for New York, and the poor reception added to Toller's discouragement.

Suffering from depression, separated from his wife and struggling with financial woes (he had given all his money to Spanish Civil War refugees), Toller died by suicide on 22 May 1939. He hanged himself in his room at the Mayflower Hotel after laying out on his hotel desk "photos of Spanish children who had been killed by fascist bombs".

The English author Robert Payne, who knew Toller in Spain and in Paris, wrote in his diary that Toller had said shortly before his death:

"If ever you read that I committed suicide, I beg you not to believe it." Payne continued: "He hanged himself with the silk cord of his nightgown in a hotel in New York two years ago. This is what the newspapers said at the time, but I continue to believe that he was murdered".

W. H. Auden's poem "In Memory of Ernst Toller" was published in Another Time (1940).

== Works ==
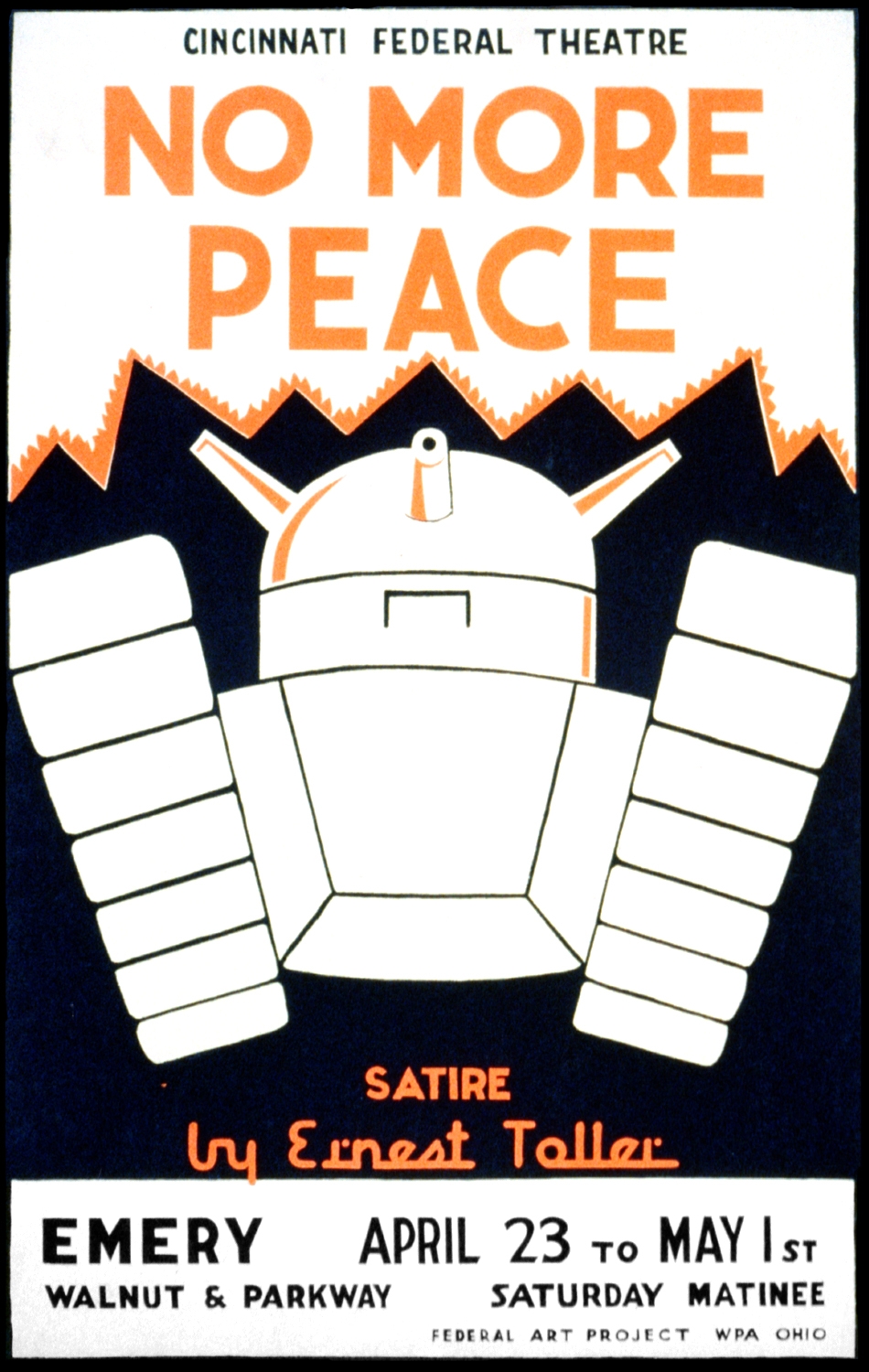
Poster for the Federal Theatre Project production of No More Peace in Cincinnati, Ohio (1937)

- Transfiguration (Die Wandlung, 1919)
- Masses Man (Masse Mensch, 1921)
- The Machine Wreckers (Die Maschinenstürmer, 1922)
- Hinkemann (orig. Der deutsche Hinkemann), premiered 19 September 1923 and produced under the titles The Red Laugh and Bloody Laughter (US). Issued in England by the Nonesuch Press in 1926 under the title Brokenbrow with a translation by Vera Mendel.
- Hoppla, We're Alive! (Hoppla, wir leben!, 1927)
- Feuer aus den Kesseln (1930)
- Mary Baker Eddy (1930), play in five acts, with Hermann Kesten

After exile:

- Eine Jugend in Deutschland (A Youth in Germany, 1933), autobiography, Amsterdam
- I Was a German: The Autobiography of a Revolutionary (1934), New York: Paragon
- Nie Wieder Friede! (No More Peace ,1935), first published and produced in English, as he was living in London, but it was originally written in German.
- Briefe aus dem Gefängnis (Letters from Prison, 1935), Amsterdam
- Letters from Prison: Including Poems and a New Version of 'The Swallow Book' (1936), London

In 2000, Alan Pearlman published a translation into English of several of Toller's plays. The literary rights to Toller's work were the property of the novelist Katharine Weber until the copyright expired on 31 December 2009. His work is now in the public domain.

The most recent comprehensive biography of Toller is Robert Ellis's Ernst Toller and German Society. Intellectuals as Leaders and Critics (Fairleigh Dickinson University Press, 2013).

== Influence ==
- The English dramatist Torben Betts reworked Hinkemann; his play Broken was produced in the UK in 2011.
- Toller was a central character in Anna Funder's Miles Franklin Award-winning novel All That I Am.
- Paul Schrader's 2017 film First Reformed centers on a troubled, although Protestant, character named for Toller.
- A poem by Miklos Radnoti (Radnóti Miklós) was published as "Thursday" (Hungarian title: "Csütörtök") in 1939.
- Tankred Dorst's play Toller explores the political situation in Germany during the Weimar Republic through Toller, depicting him as an inexperienced political leader who clashes with the communist Leviné. It raises questions about political ideals and activism during times of political oppression and violence.
- Rotmord is a film about Toller and the Munich Soviet Republic directed by Peter Zadek. It won the Prix Italia in 1969 and the Adolf-Grimme-Preis with Gold in 1970.

== Sources ==
- Tankred Dorst (1968). Toller (suhrkamp ed.). Suhrkamp Verlag. ISBN 3-518-10294-X.
- Dove, Richard (1990). He was a German: A Biography of Ernst Toller. Libris, London. ISBN 1-870352-85-8.
- Fuld, Werner; Ostermaier(Hrsg.), Albert (1996). Die Göttin und ihr Sozialist: Gristiane Grauthoff - ihr Leben mit Ernst Toller. Weidle Verlag, Bonn. ISBN 3-931135-18-7.
- Ossar, Michael (1980). Anarchism in the Dramas of Ernst Toller: The Realm of Necessity and the Realm of Freedom. State University of New York Press, Albany. ISBN 0873953932.
- Mauthner, Martin (2007). German Writers in French Exile, 1933-1940. London. ISBN 978-0853035411.
- Ellis, Robert; Toller and, Ernst; German Society (2013). Intellectuals as Leaders and Critics, 1914-1939. Fairleigh Dickinson University Press.
