= Max Levien =

German politician (1885–1937)

- Макс Левин
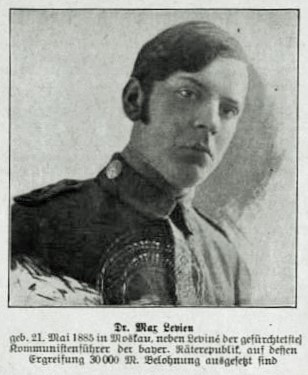
- Levien in 1919
- Born: Макс Людвигович Левин; Max Lyudvigovich Levien; 21 May 1885; Moscow, Russian Empire
- Died: 17 June 1937 (aged 52); Soviet Union
- Occupations: Politician; academic; journalist; biologist
- Political party: Socialist Revolutionary Party (1906); Russian Social Democratic Labour Party (1913); Communist Party of Germany (1918); Communist Party of the Soviet Union (1925)

Academic work
- Institutions: Moscow State University
- Military career
- Allegiance: German Empire
- Branch: Imperial German Army
- Service years: 1914–1918
- Unit: Royal Bavarian Life Guards Regiment
- Conflict: First World War

Max Levien (Russian: Макс Левин, romanized: Maks Levin; 21 May 1885 – 17 June 1937) was a Russian-German Communist politician, academic, journalist and biologist, known for co-founding the Munich Spartacus League and the Communist Party of Germany (KPD). A victim of the Great Purge, Levien was arrested on 10 December 1936 and initially sentenced to 5 years camp imprisonment. Levien's sentence was subsequently converted to the death penalty on 16 June.

== Life ==
=== Early life ===
Max Lyudvigovich Levien (Russian: Макс Людвигович Левин, romanized: Maks Lyudvigovich Levin) was born on 21 May 1885 in Moscow, Russian Empire (present-day Russia) to a Russian German merchant family. His studies began in 1893 at the Moscow German Gymnasium and continued in 1897 in Meissen, Germany, where he graduated in 1902. He discontinued his scientific studies at the University of Halle in the fall of 1905 to participate in the Russian revolution that year. Joining the Socialist Revolutionary Party (SR) in 1906, he was arrested by the Okhrana and sentenced to prison in Moscow in 1907. After his release in 1908, Levien went to Zürich where he continued his studies, and graduated with a doctorate in the summer of 1913. In Switzerland, he joined the Russian Social Democratic Party, had contacts with Lenin and became a follower of the Bolsheviks. After graduation, Levien went to Germany and became a German citizen. On 29 October 1913, he volunteered for the Royal Bavarian Infantry Lifeguards Regiment and served from 1914 to 1918 on most fronts in the First World War, fighting alternately in France, Italy, Serbia and Romania.

=== Revolution and Council republic ===
During the November revolution he was active in the soldiers' and workers' councils and worked closely with the anarchist writer and activist Erich Mühsam. Levien became chairman of the Munich Soldiers' Council and a leader of the Munich Spartacus group. He participated as a delegate for Munich in the founding convention of the Communist Party of Germany (KPD) over the New Year 1918–19, and was elected chairman of the KPD in Bavaria in early 1919. Levien was together with Eugen Leviné one of the leaders of the second phase of the Soviet Republic after the suppression of the right-wing counter-coup on Palm Sunday 13 April 1919. Levien was one of the leading political figures of the new communist-led Soviet Republic. Unlike Leviné, Levien was of German descent and was not Jewish, but was nevertheless defamed as Jewish by right-wing political opponents. Levien was arrested after the suppression of the Soviet Republic, but escaped and fled to Vienna in May 1919, where he was arrested again. There he was arrested again.

By November 1919, Levien was being held at Burg Karlstein, alongside Béla Kun. The Austrian government released Levien by the end of 1920. Before that, long negotiations had taken place after the Bavarian judiciary had placed a request for his extradition.

=== Soviet exile ===
Levien settled in Moscow in June 1921, there he first worked in the hunger relief for Soviet Russia. Elected in 1922 into the Executive Committee of the Comintern (ECCI), he worked in his apparatus and participated in 1924 at the 5th World Congress of the Communist International. Levien was later involved in academic work as a journalist and biologist, he was an editor of the philosophical journal Under the Banner of Marxism and lectured at the Communist University of the National Minorities of the West and the Communist Academy and was a member of its presidium. In 1925 he became member of the Communist Party of the Soviet Union. During this time Levien was closely associated with the disgraced former KPD leader Arkadi Maslow.

In the 1930s he had a professorship for History and Philosophy of natural sciences at the Moscow University.

== Death ==
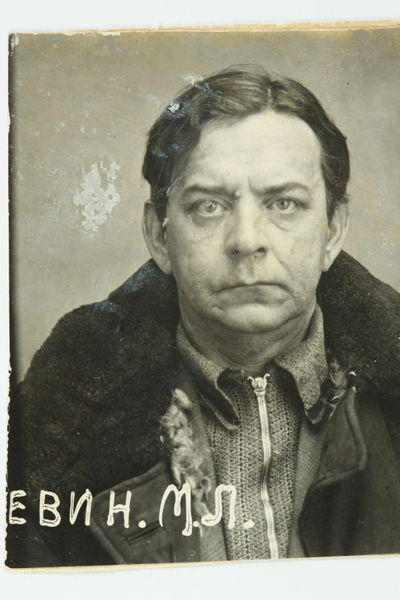
Photo of Levien after his arrest by the NKVD

Eventually Levien fell victim to the Great Terror. He was arrested by the NKVD on 10 December 1936 and was in March 1937 initially sentenced to five years camp imprisonment. But on 16 June the verdict was converted into a death sentence, which was executed the following day.

Max Levien is classified by the Russian historian Alexander Vatlin as a victim of the German operation of the NKVD, even if he was sentenced and executed before Nikolai Yezhov signed the order of its initiation.

== Personal life and legacy ==
Karl Retzlaw, who personally knew and worked with him, wrote in his biography: "Max Levien was an interesting figure. About 35 years old, medium-sized, full dark hair - "artist's mane" - doctor of science and a great, quick-witted speaker.“

== Literature ==
- Martin H. Geyer: Verkehrte Welt. Revolution, Inflation und Moderne. München 1914–1924, Göttingen, Vandenhoeck & Ruprecht, 1998, p. 82.
- Branko Lazitch; Drachkovitch, Milorad M. (Hgg.): Biographical Dictionary of the Comintern, Stanford/CA, Hoover Institution Press, 1986, p. 259f.
- Natalia Mussienko; Ulla Plener (Hgg.): Verurteilt zur Höchststrafe. Tod durch Erschießen. Todesopfer aus Deutschland und deutscher Nationalität im Großen Terror in der Sowjetunion 1937/1938, Berlin, Dietz, 2006, p. 58.
- Levien, Max. In: Hermann Weber, Andreas Herbst: Deutsche Kommunisten. Biographisches Handbuch 1918 bis 1945. 2., überarbeitete und stark erweiterte Auflage. Karl Dietz, Berlin 2008, ISBN 978-3-320-02130-6.
- Hermann Weber: „Zu den Beziehungen zwischen der KPD und der Kommunistischen Internationale“, in: Vierteljahrshefte für Zeitgeschichte 16 (1968), 2, p. 177–208, here: p. 188 (PDF).
