= Eugen Leviné =

German communist revolutionary (1883–1919)

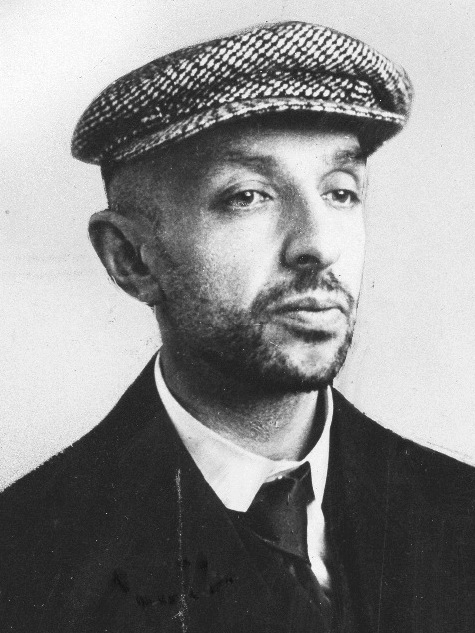
- Leviné c. 1919

Leader of the Bavarian Soviet Republic
- In office 12 April 1919 – 3 May 1919
- Preceded by: Ernst Toller
- Succeeded by: Office abolished

Personal details
- Born: 10 May 1883 St Petersburg, Russian Empire
- Died: 5 June 1919 (aged 36) Stadelheim Prison, Munich, Bavaria, Germany
- Party: Communist Party of Germany
- Spouse: Rosa Broido
- Children: Eugen Leviné

Eugen Leviné (Russian: Евгений Левине, romanized: Yevgeny Levine; 10 May 1883 – 5 June 1919), also known as Dr. Eugen Leviné, was a German communist revolutionary and one of the leaders of the short-lived Second Bavarian Soviet Republic.

== Background ==
Eugen Leviné was born on 10 May 1883 in St. Petersburg to affluent Jewish merchants, Julius and Rozalia (née Goldberg) Leviné. Julius Leviné died when Eugen was three years old, and Rozalia emigrated to Germany with her son, settling in Wiesbaden and Mannheim. Eugen went on to study law at the Heidelberg University. While a student there, he remained in touch with Russia.

== Career ==
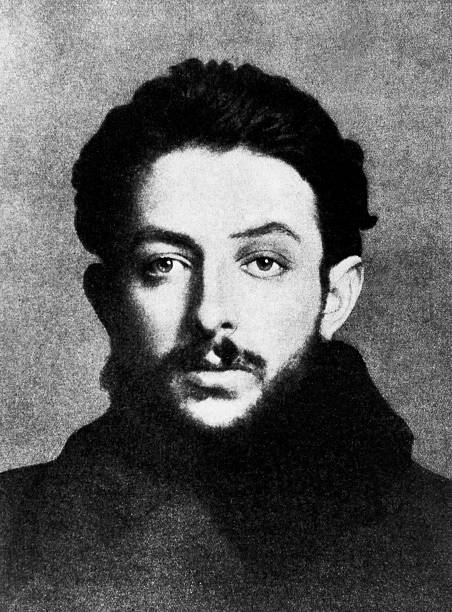
Leviné, undated

=== 1905 revolution ===
Leviné returned to Russia to participate in the failed revolution of 1905 against the Tsar. For his actions, he was exiled to Siberia. He eventually escaped to Germany and began studying at Heidelberg University and married in 1915. For a short time, he served in the Imperial German Army during the First World War.

=== 1919 Bavarian Soviet Republic ===
Leviné helped establish and lead the short-lived Bavarian Soviet Republic (territory in red vs. Weimar Republic in beige)

After the war ended, Leviné joined the Communist Party of Germany (KPD), which, under Paul Levi, who sent first Max Levien in December 1918 and then Leviné, first to Upper Silesia to quell an uprising and then in March 1919 to Munich to organize the KPD locally and help to create a socialist republic in Bavaria. Neither Levien or Leviné had much revolutionary experience.

The republic lasted only several weeks, replaced quickly by a Soviet-style republic after the assassination of Kurt Eisner, then leader of the Independent Social Democratic Party of Germany (USPD). The ruling government of the new republic lasted only six days, due to poor leadership under the German-Jewish playwright Ernst Toller.

==== Coup ====
On 13 April 1919, a "Red Army," led by Leviné and without KPD orders or approval, won clashes with the Toller's soldiers, created a second soviet republic with Leviné at its head, who then received approval and support directly from Lenin.

Leviné attempted to expropriate luxurious flats to the homeless and seize factories and place them under workers control. He introduced censorship and a "military-style" government, while also revamping education and declaring the Munich Frauenkirche a revolutionary temple. These actions followed inquiries from Lenin as to whether Leviné had assumed control of banks and taken bourgeois hostages.

On 27 April 1919, Leviné stepped down ("abdicated") as leader of the Soviet. As the German president Friedrich Ebert gave orders to subdue the Bavarian Soviet Republic and reinstate the Bavarian government under Johannes Hoffmann, the Red Guards executed eight hostages on 29 April 1919.

==== Countercoup, arrest, trial ====
The German Army, assisted by Freikorps, with a force of roughly 39,000 men invaded and quickly re-conquered Munich on 3 May 1919. Leviné personally took part in the street fighting against them. In retaliation for the execution of the hostages, the Freikorps captured or killed some 700 men and women. Leviné evaded arrest at first, perhaps by hiding in the apartment of Erich Katzenstein. Leviné was captured on 13 May 1919. Public interest in his trial was high. On 19 May 1919, Albert Einstein sent a joint telegram asking the courts to delay Leviné's trial. Leviné was tried along with Toller in early June 1919; Max Hirschberg refused to serve as his legal counsel, but Anton Graf von Pestalozza accepted. On 3 June 1919, the courts, calling him a "foreign interloper in Bavaria", sentenced Leviné to death by execution. Soldiers, bureaucrats, and members of the public passed by to see the so-called "blood-thirsty Robespierre" while he awaited execution, his wife later reported.

==== Speech ====
Leviné gave the following speech during his trial:

We Communists are all dead men on leave. Of this I am fully aware. I do not know if you will extend my leave or whether I shall have to join Karl Liebknecht and Rosa Luxemburg. In any case I await your verdict with composure and inner serenity. For I know that, whatever your verdict, events cannot be stopped.

=== Aftermath ===
In reaction to the two Bavarian socialist republics, whose leaders included many Jews, Bavaria, which was already conservative and anti-Semitic, became even more so. One of the people affected was Reiner Maria Rilke, who left Munich after soldiers ransacked his apartment.

== Personal life and death ==
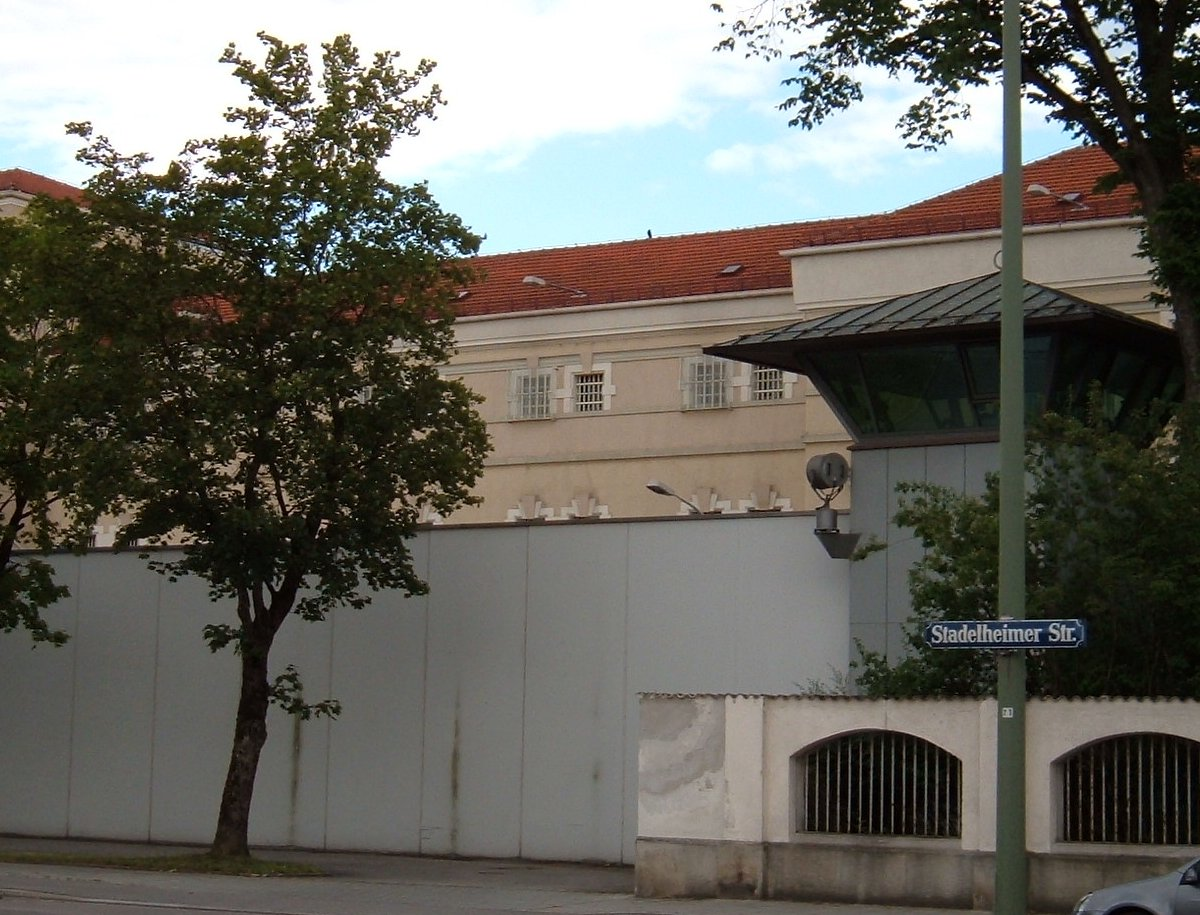
Stadelheim Prison (c. 2006), site of Leviné's execution in 1919

In 1915, Leviné married Rosa Broido (from the Polish town of Gródek), who married Ernst Meyer (1887–1930) and so became known as Meyer-Leviné, and then fled Germany when Hitler came to power and lived the rest of her life in London (1890–1979). The Levinés had at least one child, a son, whom they named Eugen.

Stephen Eric Bronner considers Leviné a follower of Rosa Luxemburg (for seeking "to provide a legacy for the next generation," knowing "the soviet was doomed") and characterized him as follows:

He incarnated the best of the Bolshevik spirit. He was unyielding and dogmatic, but an honest intellectual and totally committed to the most radical utopian ideals of international revolution... [and] also exhibited exceptional bravery."

Leviné was executed, age 36, on 5 June (or 6), 1919, by firing squad in Stadelheim Prison. Lawyer von Pestalozza arranged a Jewish funeral for the Marxist revolutionary.

== Works ==
Books by Eugen Leviné

- Ahasver, Rede vor Gericht, u. anderes (Wandering Jew, Speech in Court, and Others) (1919)
  - Skizzen, Rede vor Gericht und Anderes (Sketches, Speech in Court, and Others) (1925)
- Stimmen der Völker zum Krieg (Voices of the Nations on War) (1925)

Books by wife Rosa Meyer-Leviné

- Aus der Münchener Rätezeit (1925)
  - Sovetskaia respublika v Miunkhene (1926)
- Leviné: Leben und Tod eines Revolutionärs (1972)
  - Leviné: The Life of a Revolutionary (1973)
- Leviné, the Spartacist (1978)
- Im Inneren Kreis: Erinnerungen Einer Kommunistin in Deutschland, 1920–1933 (1979)

Near-contemporary books on Leviné

- Eugen Leviné (1922)
- Evgeny Levine (1927)
- Broeder, ik kan de brief niet aannemen (undated)

== Influence ==
Max Hirshberg remembered Leviné as "far superior" to Levien "in learning and spiritual purpose" but believed both had committed blindly to the "correctness of Russian methods."

In 1948, American ex-Soviet agent and later anti-communist Whittaker Chambers cited Leviné as one of three men who inspired him to join the Communist Party USA during testimony before the House Un-American Activities Committee, quoted in his 1952 memoir:

Then I said: "When I was a Communist, I had three heroes. One was a Russian. One was a Pole. One was a German Jew. "The German Jew was Eugen Levine. He was a Communist. During the Bavarian Soviet Republic in 1919, Levine was the organizer of the Workers and Soldiers Soviets. When the Bavarian Soviet Republic was crushed, Levine was captured and courtmartialed. The court-martial told him: 'You are under sentence of death.' Levine answered: 'We Communists are always under sentence of death.'"

In 2017, Michael Löwy placed Leviné in a group of Jewish libertarians including Hans Köhn, Rudolph Kayser, and Erich Unger, as well as Toller and Manes Sperber.

== See also ==
- Paul Levi
- Max Levien
- People's State of Bavaria
- Free State of Bavaria (Weimar Republic)
- German Revolution of 1918–1919
- Revolutions of 1917–1923
