= 1958 Bavarian state election =

State election in Bavaria, Germany

- 23 November 1958

All 204 seats in the Landtag of Bavaria 103 seats needed for a majority
- Registered: 6,254,214
- Turnout: 4,655,745 (76.6%) ▼5.8%
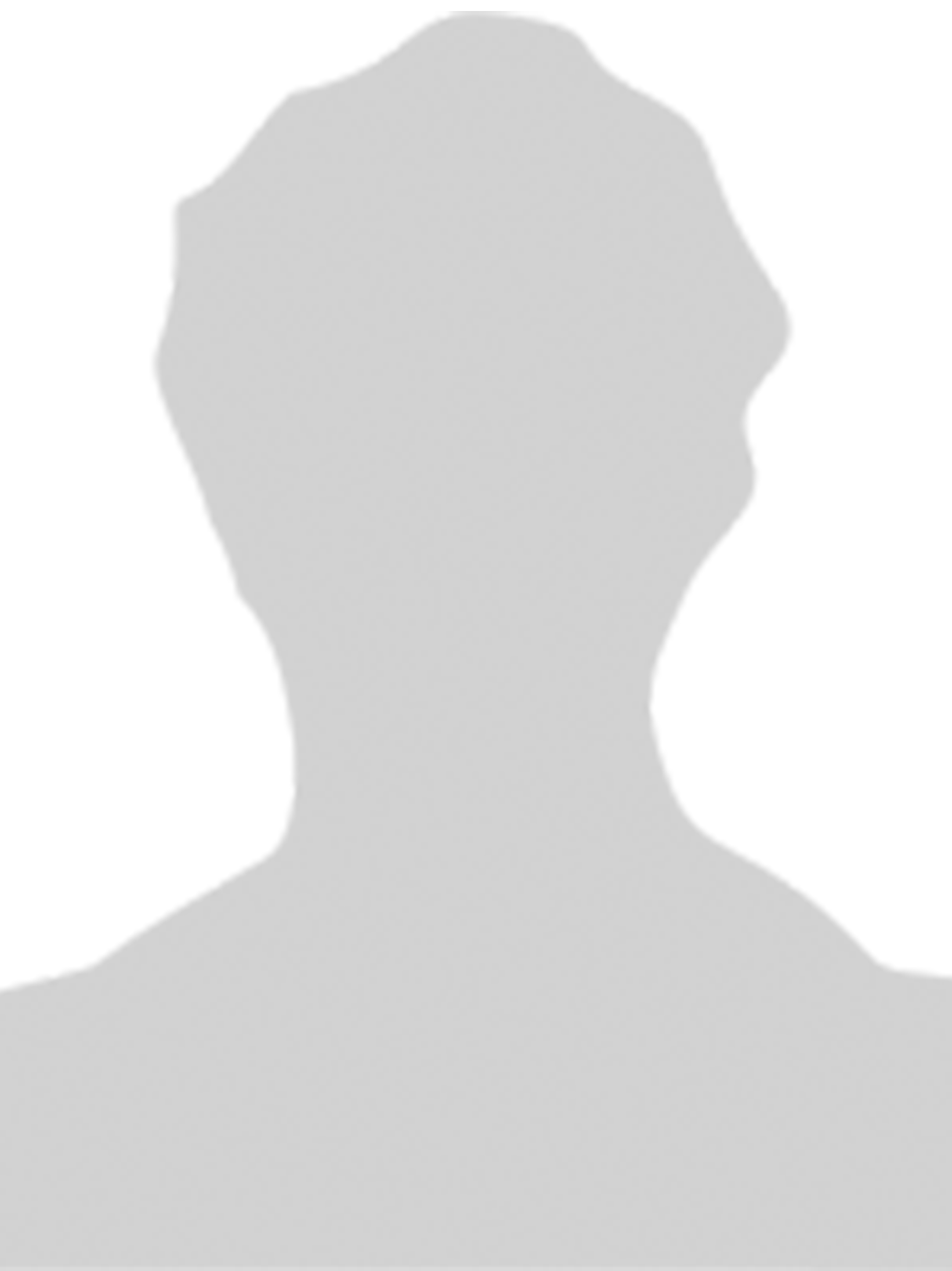

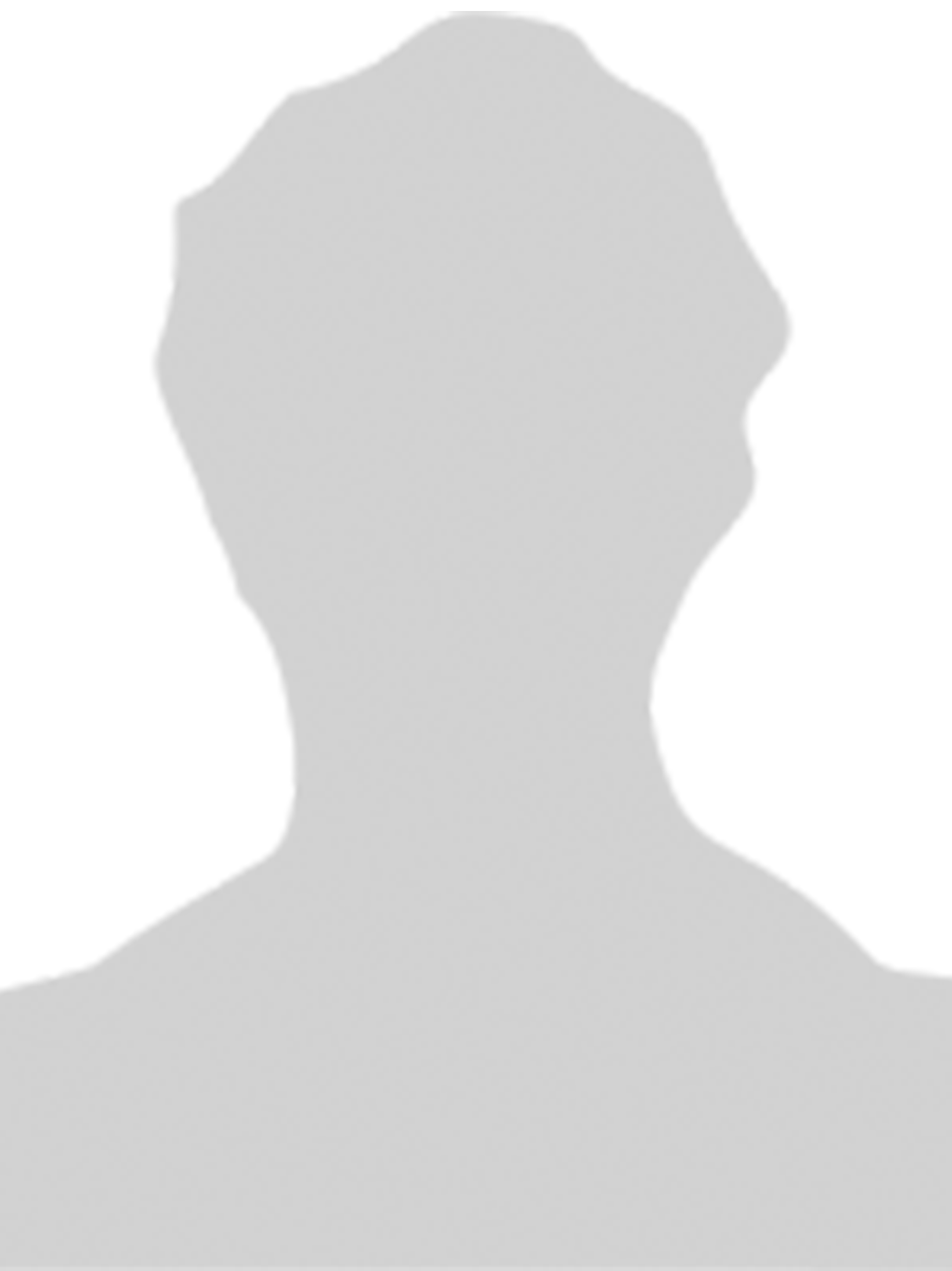

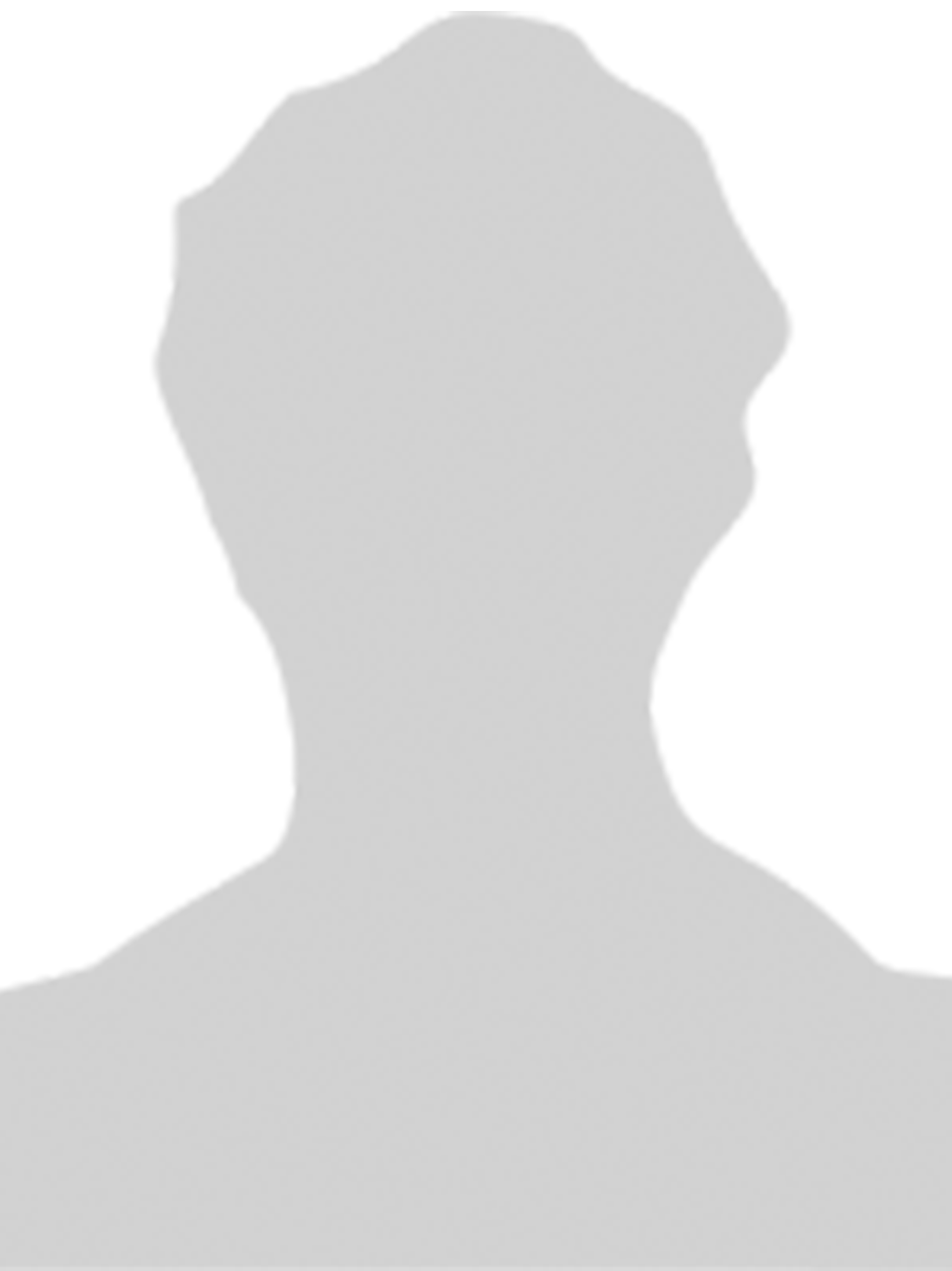

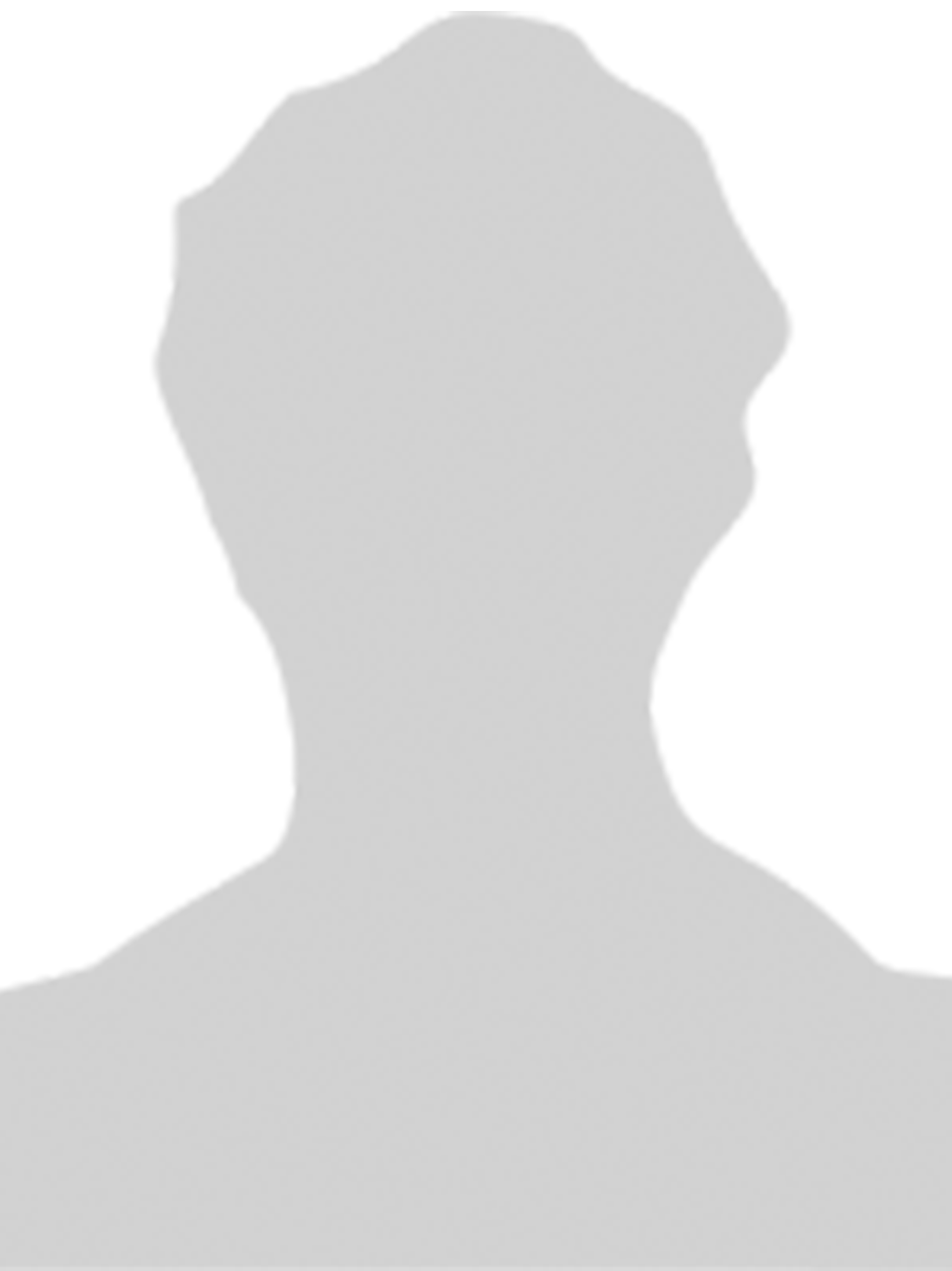

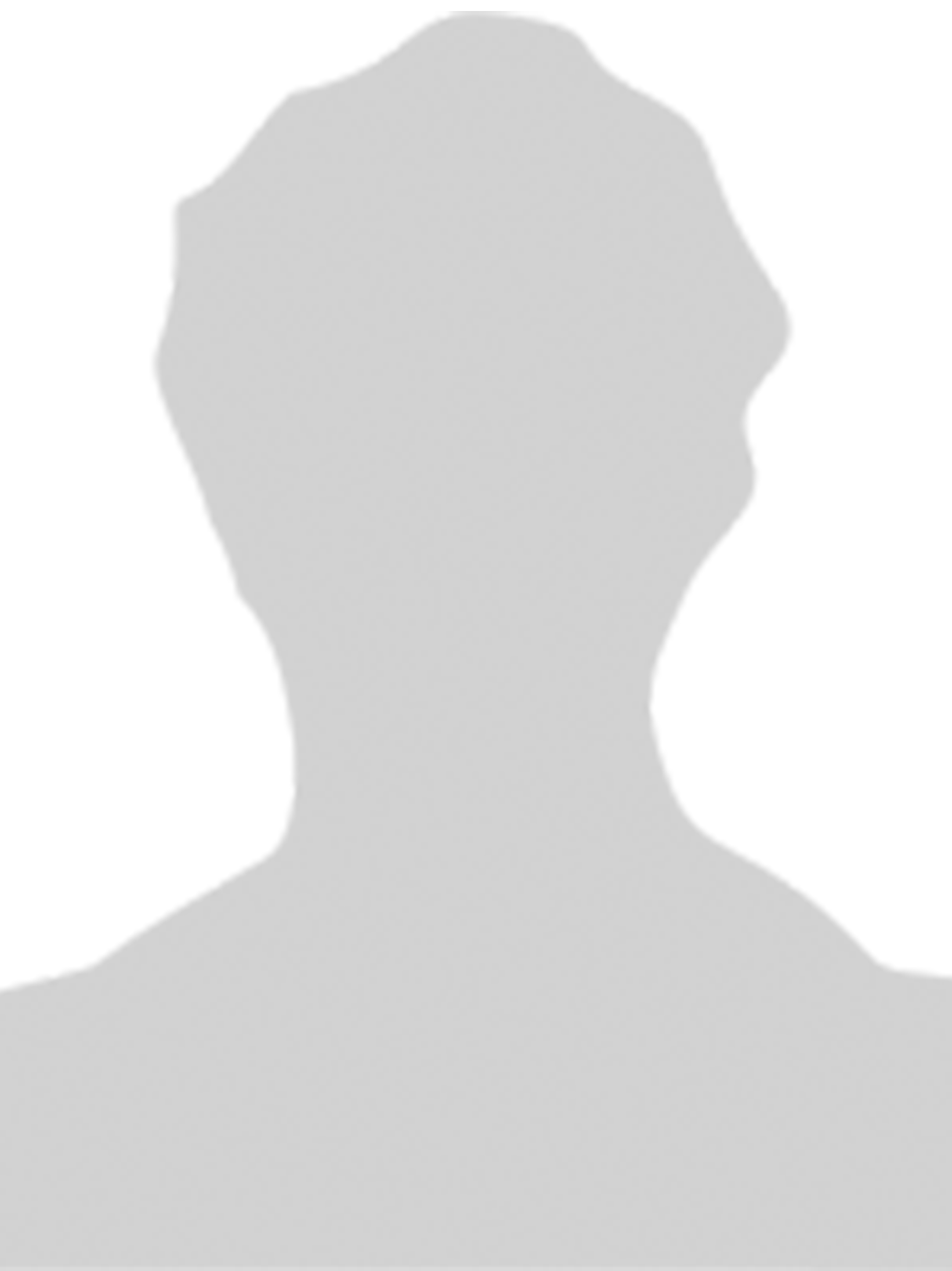
	First party	Second party	Third party
Leader	Georg Meixner	Waldemar von Knoeringen	Willi Guthsmuths
Party	CSU	SPD	GB/BHE
Seats won	101	64	17
Seat change	▲18	▲3	▼2
Popular vote	4,192,904	2,839,300	793,628
Percentage	45.6%	30.9%	8.6%
Swing	▲7.6%	▲2.7%	▼1.6%
	Fourth party	Fifth party
Leader	Jakob Fischbacher	Karl Eberhardt
Party	BP	FDP
Seats won	14	8
Seat change	▼14	▼5
Popular vote	742,424	512,344
Percentage	8.1%	5.6%
Swing	▼5.1%	▼1.6%
- Results for the single-member constituencies.
Minister-President before election
Hanns Seidel
CSU
Elected Minister-President
Hanns Seidel
CSU

The 1958 Bavarian state election was held on 23 November 1958 to elect the members of the Fourth Bavarian Landtag, and was notable for being held in the midst of the Casino Affair, which indicted several Bavarian politicians in the previous government on charges of corruption.

The Christian Social Union in Bavaria (CSU) has won every Bavarian state election since 1958, as of 2026.

== Background ==
=== Viererkoalition ===
While the CSU was still suffering from the major upset of the 1950 state elections, it found itself recouping their losses in 1954, gaining back 19 seats out of the total 40 lost in 1950, and the SPD struggled to keep its upwards momentum. That opened a door to another grand coalition, which had been done twice, or a possible alliance with the declining right-wing parties. However, the SPD pulled a major coup after the election results had come in. Under SPD Landtag Chairman Waldemar von Knoeringen, negotiations were brokered with the BP, GB/BHE and FDP for a Viererkoalition (coalition of four) against the CSU. That was approved, and the SPD politician Wilhelm Hoegner became Minister-President for a second time, with the BP co-founder Joseph Baumgartner as his deputy. That caused internal strife within the CSU, which led to the resignation of Hans Ehard as party chair in January 1955, but he remained in his position as President of Landtag.

=== Casino Affair ===
In 1951, the businessman Karl Freisehner had approached the government about casino operating concessions in his name. That was rejected, but several Landtag members had received a bribe of 50,000 marks to vote for it. With enough pressure, the Bavarian government gave the licences in April 1955. Soon afterwards, the CSU had launched a parliamentary investigation into the opening of the casinos. One of the recipients of the 50,000-mark check was a CSU deputy, Franz Michel, who came forwards to his other party members. Later, he claimed that he had burned the check. The crusade against bribery was now led by Friedrich Zimmermann, who reportedly had incriminating evidence on Baumgartner. In 1957, Baumgartner and Interior Minister August Geislhöringer, also a member of the BP, resigned in the face of the allegations.

The Viererkoalition officially collapsed on 8 October 1957 by the Casino Affair and the CDU/CSU victory in the 1957 federal election. The right-wing parties abandoned the SPD in reaction to the election, and Hoegner submitted his resignation on 9 October 1957. The CSU politician Hanns Seidel was chosen as Minister-President and formed a coalition with the FDP and GB/BHE, which would last through the 1958 state elections.

== Results ==
The Casino Affair and the 1958 elections were a major coup for the CSU, which had completely regained the seats lost in 1950 but was now only three off from a Landtag majority. It continued the right-wing coalition government under Seidel, and Zimmerman continued his investigations with vigour. In January 1959, Freisehner came forward with documents detailing payments made to Baumgartner and Geislhöringer. Both were sentenced to jail, with Baumgartner receiving two years and Geislhöringer one-and-a-half years. It would later be revealed that the documents Freisehner had presented were most likely forged, but it no longer mattered since the BP had managed to destroy its own reputation.

The right-wing populists in Bavaria had gone through several ups and downs since the formation of post-war democracy, starting with the rise of the Economic Reconstruction Union and Alfred Loritz's rise to the state cabinet and subsequent escape to Switzerland in 1947 to 1948. The quick rise of the BP and GB/BHE were no different. In the 1952 local elections the BP won 705 seats and 10.2% of the vote; in 1956, it on the eve of the Casino Affair, ot won 519 seats and 7.6% of the vote; and finally in 1960, it won 145 seats and 2.3% of the vote. By 1972, it won only two local seats. In that same 1952-1960 period, the GB/BHE went from 740 seats and 10.1% of the vote to 550 seats and 7.8% of the vote and finally to 464 seats and 6.7% of the vote before it disbanded. The Casino Affair solidified the downward trend of these parties and the integration of the more radical elements of Bavarian politics into the mainstream parties of the CSU and FDP.

The CSU continued on a relative path of prosperity, even with the death of Minister-President Seidel, who was replaced by the formerly-disgraced chairman of the state party, Hans Ehard, who continued forth with essentially the same cabinet.

== Parties ==
The table below lists parties represented in the Third Landtag of Bavaria.

Name		Ideology	Leader(s)	1954 result	
Name		Ideology	Leader(s)	Votes (%)	Seats
CSU	Christian Social Union in Bavaria; Christlich-Soziale Union in Bayern	Christian democracy	George Mexiner	38	83 / 204
SPD	Social Democratic Party of Germany; Sozialdemokratische Partei Deutschlands	Social democracy	Waldemar von Knoeringen	28.1	61 / 204
BP	Bavaria Party; Bayernpartei	Bavarian nationalism	Joseph Baumgartner	13.2	28 / 204
GB/BHE	All-German Bloc/League of Expellees and Deprived of Rights; Gesamtdeutscher Block/Bund der Heimatvertriebenen und Entrechteten	German nationalism	Willi Guthsmuths	10.2	19 / 204
FDP	Free Democratic Party; Freie Demokratische Partei	Classical liberalism	Karl Eberhardt	7.2	13 / 204

Summary of the 23 November 1958 election results of the Landtag of Bavaria
Party	Votes	%	+/-	Seats	+/-	Seats %
Christian Social Union (CSU)	4,192,904	45.6	▲7.6	101	▲18	49.5
Social Democratic Party (SPD)	2,839,300	30.9	▲2.7	64	▲3	31.4
All-German Bloc/League of Expellees and Deprived of Rights (GB/BHE)	793,628	8.6	▼1.6	17	▼2	8.3
Bavaria Party	742,424	8.1	▼5.1	14	▼14	6.9
Free Democratic Party (FDP)	512,344	5.6	▼1.6	8	▼5	3.9
Others	123,220	0.9		0	±0	0
Total	9,203,820	100.0		204		
Voter turnout		76.6	▼5.8			
Source: Statistik Bayern and Historisches Lexikon Bayerns

Popular Vote
CSU	45.6%
SPD	30.9%
GB/BHE	8.6%
BP	8.1%
FDP	5.6%
Other	0.9%

Landtag seats
CSU	49.5%
SPD	31.4%
GB/BHE	8.3%
BP	6.9%
FDP	3.9%
