= Willi Ankermüller =

German politician and jurist (born 1901)

Willi Ankermüller (18 March 1901, Bad Neustadt an der Saale, Lower Franconia – 7 July 1986 in Grosshesselohe) was a German politician and jurist. He represented the Christian Social Union of Bavaria (CSU), and was a member of the Landtag of Bavaria in the 1950s.

== Education ==
Ankermüller studied law and political science at the University of Würzburg. There he became an active member of the Catholic Student Association. In 1925, he supported property rights of churches according to the Codex Juris Canonici, and worked as a magistrate and then director of the municipal youth office in Schweinfurt. Two years later he passed the second legal state examination and settled in Schweinfurt as a lawyer. After the Nazis came to power in Germany, he was taken into protective custody in 1933. In 1938, he was recruited into the Wehrmacht and served as a soldier in the Second World War between 1939 and 1945.

He was married to Elisabeth geb. Dielmann.

== Post-war career ==
He began his political career in the spring of 1945, when he was employed by the U.S. military government as a district administrator of the county of Hofheim in Unterfranken. There, he was co-founder of the local CSU in the fall of 1945. The following year, he took over the post of district administrator in the neighboring district of Bad Neustadt an der Saale. His contacts with the Würzburg group of the CSU paved the way for Ankermüller to advance into Bavarian state politics.

In June 1946, he was elected to the Constituent Assembly, which worked out a new Constitution of Bavaria, and served until the end of October 1946. In the popular vote on the constitution on December 1, 1946, and the simultaneous state elections, Ankermüller was elected to the first Bavarian parliament after the end of the war (the Landtag of Bavaria), and six weeks later was appointed Secretary of State in the Ministry of the Interior, led by Josef Seifried. When the Social Democratic Party of Germany (SPD) left the government of Hans Ehard in September 1947, he took over Seifried's office as Minister of the Interior. With the new formation of the CSU / SPD coalition after the regional election in 1950, a new Interior Minister took office: Wilhelm Hoegner who was known as the father of the new Bavarian constitution.

In his parliamentary work, Ankermüller concentrated on legal and security policy issues. He took the chairmanship of the Security Affairs Committee and became deputy chairman of the Committee on Legal and Constitutional Questions. He also served from 1950 to 1962 as a non-professional judge of the Bavarian Constitutional Court.

In October 1957, the four-party coalition led by Wilhelm Hoegner collapsed and Hanns Seidel was elected as the new Prime Minister of Bavaria. Seidel, who also came from Unterfranken, appointed Ankermüller as a Bavarian Minister of Justice in his cabinet. He remained in that office until the state elections in December 1958. He then resumed his activity as an attorney, but until the end of the 5th legislative period in November 1966 he remained a Landtag deputy.

== Awards ==
- Bavarian Order of Merit, 1959

== See also ==
- List of Bavarian Christian Social Union politicians
