= 1950 Bavarian state election =

State election in Germany

- 26 November 1950

All 204 seats in the Landtag of Bavaria 103 seats needed for a majority
- Registered: 6,026,641
- Turnout: 4,813,528 (79.9%) ▲4.2%
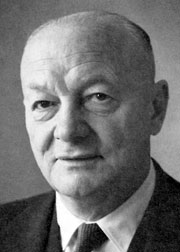

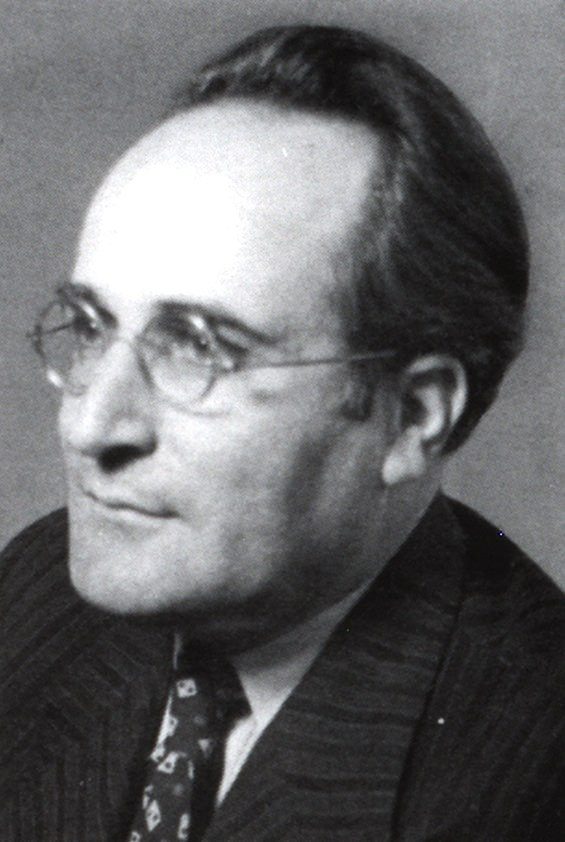

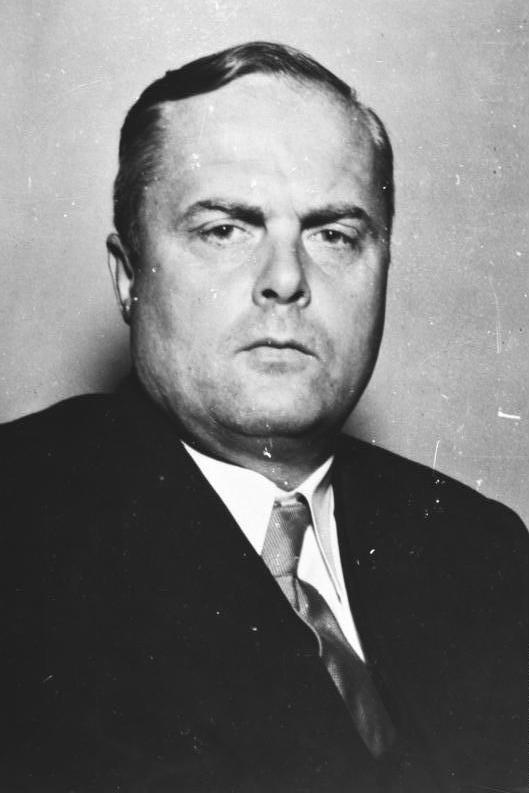

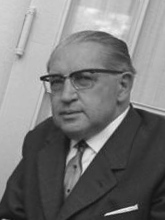
| | First party | Second party | Third party |
|---|---|---|---|
| Leader | Jean Stock | Alois Hundhammer | Joseph Baumgartner |
| Party | SPD | CSU | BP |
| Seats won | 63 | 64 | 39 |
| Seat change | ▲9 | ▼40 | ▲39 |
| Popular vote | 2,588,549 | 2,527,370 | 1,657,713 |
| Percentage | 28.0% | 27.4% | 17.9% |
| Swing | ▼0.6% | ▼24.9% | ▲17.9% |
| | Fourth party | Fifth party |
| Leader | Theodor Oberländer | Thomas Dehler |
| Party | BHE–DG | FDP |
| Seats won | 26 | 12 |
| Seat change | ▲26 | ▲3 |
| Popular vote | 1,136,148 | 653,741 |
| Percentage | 12.2% | 7.1% |
| Swing | ▲12.2% | ▲1.4% |
- Results for the single-member constituencies.
Minister-President before election
Hans Ehard
CSU
Elected Minister-President
Hans Ehard
CSU

The 1950 Bavarian state election was held on 26 November 1950 to elect the members of the 2nd Landtag of Bavaria. The outgoing government was a majority of the Christian Social Union (CSU) led by Minister-President Hans Ehard.

The CSU suffered an enormous decline of 25 percentage points, and lost first place in the overall vote to the opposition Social Democratic Party (SPD) by a slight margin. However, the CSU narrowly retained a plurality of 64 seats to the SPD's 63 thanks to the regional apportionment of seats. Two new parties entered the Landtag: the Bavaria Party (BP) with 18% of the vote and the All-German Bloc (BHE) with 12%. The Free Democratic Party (FDP) also improved to 7%. The CSU subsequently formed a grand coalition with the SPD, and Minister-President Ehard continued in office.

The 1950 election remains the CSU's worst performance in a Bavarian election and the only occasion they did not win a plurality of the vote.

== Background ==
After the 1946 state elections, the CSU had won a majority of seats in the Landtag, and proceeded to form a coalition government with the SPD and right-wing populist WAV under Minister-President Hans Ehard. The coalition, however, was short lived. On 20 June 1947, WAV party chairman and Minister for Denazification Alfred Loritz was ousted by his fellow party-members over a power struggle involving a fellow state delegate, Karl Meissner. Four days later, on 24 June, Loritz was dismissed from his post on charges of blackmail and patronage. He subsequently was arrested on 19 July 1947, before escaping custody, being re-arrested, and eventually found asylum in Switzerland in April 1948. In his place, a CSU attorney, Ludwig Hagenauer was appointed. Only three months after the Loritz episode, all of the SPD ministers within the government resigned, ending the coalition government, which lasted for under a year. The CSU then ruled alone (still as a majority government) for the remaining three years. In the intervening time, Ehard mainly battled with other member of his party to pass the Basic Law. The electoral system was changed since the 1946 election, now every voter has two votes. One for local district candidate (first vote) and one for a constituency candidate (second vote).

== Parties ==
The table below lists parties represented in the First Landtag of Bavaria.

| Name | | Ideology | Leader(s) | December 1946 result | |
| Name | | Ideology | Leader(s) | Votes (%) | Seats |
|---|---|---|---|---|---|
| CSU | Christian Social Union in Bavaria; Christlich-Soziale Union in Bayern | Christian democracy | Alois Hundhammer | 52.3 | 104 / 180 |
| SPD | Social Democratic Party of Germany; Sozialdemokratische Partei Deutschlands | Social democracy | Jean Stock | 28.6 | 54 / 180 |
| WAV | Economic Reconstruction Union; Wirtschaftliche Aufbau-Vereinigung | Right-wing populism | Alfred Loritz | 7.4 | 13 / 180 |
| FDP | Free Democratic Party; Freie Demokratische Partei | Liberalism | Thomas Dehler | 5.7 | 9 / 180 |

== Results ==
With the WAV now essentially collapsed due to factional disputes, the right-wing vote was scattered over several different parties, the most important being the GB/BHE and the Bavaria Party, which capitalized on nationalism and took votes away from both the WAV and CSU. With the right-wing vote now spread thin, the SPD captured a plurality of the first and second votes combined, but were still one seat off of being tied with the CSU's delegation, and neither party being close to a majority. After 17 days of negotiations, a mass coalition between the CSU, SPD, and GB/BHE was declared. On 18 December 1950, Hans Ehard received 131 votes in the Landtag to serve a second term as Minister-President, with 5 votes against, and 36 members abstaining.

| Party | Votes | | | | | | | | List seats | Total seats | +/- |
| Party | Constituency | % | Seats | List | % | Total | % | Swing | List seats | Total seats | +/- |
|---|---|---|---|---|---|---|---|---|---|---|---|
| Social Democratic Party (SPD) | 1,334,888 | 28.33 | 38 | 1,253,661 | 27.70 | 2,588,549 | 28.02 | ▼0.58 | 25 | 63 | ▲9 |
| Christian Social Union (CSU) | 1,264,993 | 26.85 | 46 | 1,262,377 | 27.89 | 2,527,370 | 27.36 | ▼24.93 | 18 | 64 | ▼40 |
| Bavaria Party (BP) | 862,123 | 18.30 | 16 | 795,590 | 17.58 | 1,657,713 | 17.94 | New | 23 | 39 | New |
| German Community / Block of Expellees and Dispossessed (BHE–DG) | 586,067 | 12.44 | 0 | 550,081 | 12.15 | 1,135,148 | 12.30 | New | 26 | 26 | New |
| Free Democratic Party (FDP) | 334,289 | 7.09 | 1 | 319,452 | 7.06 | 653,741 | 7.08 | ▲1.43 | 11 | 12 | ▲3 |
| Economic Reconstruction Union (WAV) | 132,183 | 2.81 | 0 | 127,504 | 2.82 | 259,687 | 2.81 | ▼4.58 | 0 | 0 | ▼13 |
| Communist Party of Germany (KPD) | 91,750 | 1.95 | 0 | 86,018 | 1.90 | 177,768 | 1.92 | ▼4.15 | 0 | 0 | 0 |
| German Block (DB) | 40,454 | 0.86 | 0 | 41,584 | 0.92 | 82,038 | 0.89 | New | 0 | 0 | New |
| Bavarian Homeland and King's Party (BHKP) | 29,641 | 0.64 | 0 | 41,448 | 0.92 | 71,089 | 0.77 | New | 0 | 0 | New |
| Electoral Bloc of the War-Damaged, Expelled, and Dispossessed (WKHE) | 19,499 | 0.41 | 0 | 32,740 | 0.72 | 52,239 | 0.57 | New | 0 | 0 | New |
| Bloc of Expellees (BdH) | 10,074 | 0.21 | 0 | 10,703 | 0.24 | 20,777 | 0.22 | New | 0 | 0 | New |
| Association of Economically and Politically Disenfranchised (VWPE) | 5,085 | 0.11 | 0 | 4,254 | 0.09 | 9,339 | 0.10 | New | 0 | 0 | New |
| Nonpartisan Farmers' Emergency Association – Aid for the Bavarian Forest (UBN) | 586 | 0.01 | 0 | 796 | 0.02 | 1,382 | 0.01 | New | 0 | 0 | New |
| Total | 4,711,632 | 100.00 | 101 | 4,526,208 | 100.00 | 9,237,840 | 100.00 | | 103 | 204 | ▲24 |
| Invalid | 100,290 | 2.08 | | 283,561 | 5.90 | 383,851 | 3.99 | | | | |
| Turnout | 4,811,922 | 79.84 | | 4,809,769 | 79.81 | 9,621,691 | | ▲4.11 | | | |
| Registered voters | 6,026,641 | | | 6,026,641 | | | | | | | |
Source: Statistik Bayern and Historisches Lexikon Bayerns

Popular Vote
| SPD | 28.02% |
| CSU | 27.36% |
| BP | 17.94% |
| GB/BHE | 12.30% |
| FDP | 7.08% |
| WAV | 2.81% |
| KPD | 1.92% |
| Other | 2.57% |

Landtag seats
| CSU | 31.37% |
| SPD | 30.88% |
| BP | 19.12% |
| GB/BHE | 12.75% |
| FDP | 5.88% |
