= Langenenslingen =

- Municipality
- Coat of arms

- Location of Langenenslingen within Biberach district
- Interactive map of Langenenslingen
- Location within Germany Location within Baden-Württemberg
- Coordinates: 48°8′52″N 9°22′45″E
- Country: Germany
- State: Baden-Württemberg
- Admin. region: Tübingen
- District: Biberach

Government
  - Mayor (2023–31): Andreas Schneider

Area
  - Total: 88.40 km^{2} (34.13 sq mi)
- Elevation: 571 m (1,873 ft)

Population (2025-12-31)
  - Total: 3,648
  - Density: 41.27/km^{2} (106.9/sq mi)
- Time zone: UTC+01:00 (CET)
  - Summer (DST): UTC+02:00 (CEST)
- Postal codes: 88515
- Dialling codes: 07376
- Vehicle registration: BC
- Website: www.langenenslingen.de

Langenenslingen (German pronunciation: [ˌlaŋənˈʔɛnslɪŋən]; Swabian: Ẽslenga) is a municipality in the district of Biberach in Baden-Württemberg in Germany. It has a population close to 3,500.

== Geography ==
=== Location ===
Langenenslingen is located on the northern edge of Upper Swabia in Old and Young Drift in the district of Biberach. It lies on the Upper Swabian Baroque Route, a tourist route.

The highest elevation of the Biberach district with 801 metres is located in Ittenhausen.

== History ==
Langenenslingen was first mentioned in a document in 935. It originally belonged to the Counts of Veringen. They sold it in 1291 to the House of Habsburg. In 1806 Langenenslingen fell to Hohenzollern-Sigmaringen, where it was assigned to Oberamt Sigmaringen, later Sigmaringen district. In 1945 it became a part of the newly formed Württemberg-Hohenzollern and since 1952 it has been part of the state of Baden-Württemberg. Since 1973 Langenenslingen has been located in Biberach district.

=== Amalgamations ===
- 1 February 1972: Egelfingen
- 1 January 1975: Andelfingen, Billafingen, Dürrenwaldstetten, Emerfeld, Friedingen, Ittenhausen and Unterwilflingen

=== District history ===
==== Andelfingen ====
The place Antolvinga was already mentioned in documents, when local goods from the convent St. Gallen were transferred to the Bishop of Constance.

==== Billafingen ====
Alemannic grave finds indicate a settlement already in the 7th century. In the 13th century the city came as Pilofingen to the Counts of Grüningen-Landau, later to Habsburg. In the district reform in 1973 the site was, although formerly belonging to Hohenzollern, assigned to the district of Biberach.

==== Dürrenwaldstetten ====
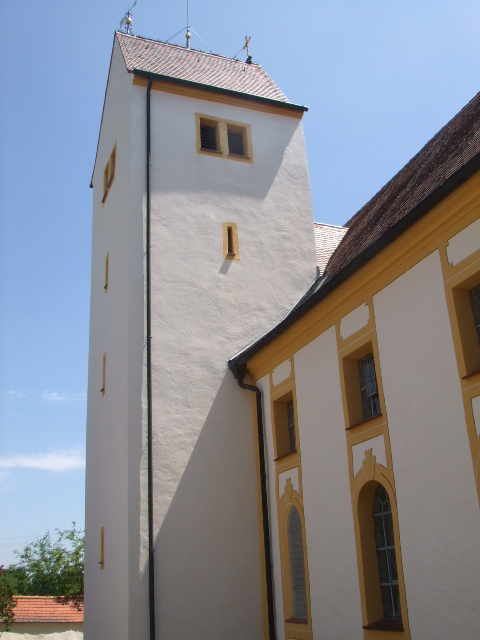
Dürrenwaldstetten St Jakob

Since 1975 it belongs to the district of Biberach. The village was first clearly identified in 1273 in a document of the monastery Heiligkreuztal. The parish map of Dürrenwaldstetten was first mentioned in 1275. In 1611/2 95 and in 1635/6 43 people died from the plague. During the Thirty Years' War Dürrenwaldstetten was plundered by Swedish troops. In 1803, the monastery Zwiefalten was secularized and the monastery's possessions came to Württemberg. The monastery's parishes, including Dürrenwaldstetten came to the Diocese of Constance. Dürrenwaldstetten came in 1809 to Oberamt Riedlingen.

Dürrenwaldstetten was connected to the electric power grid of the Oberschwäbische Elektrizitätswerke (OEW, later EVS, now EnBW) in 1922. The district of Saulgau was dissolved in 1972 as part of the district reform; Dürrenwaldstetten came to the district of Biberach. The village was dominated for a long time by agriculture. Now almost all residents are employed outside of the village in the secondary and tertiary sectors.

==== Egelfingen ====
Egelfingen belonged to the Knights rule Unterwilflingen, they were vassals of the Counts of Veringen. In 1487 the location was sold by the Counts of Hornstein to Hans Mulflingen. His heirs sold the place including the castle Schatzberg to the Schenk von Stauffenberg.

==== Emerfeld ====
Emerfeld formerly belonged to the imperial rule Gundelfingen, later to the Prince of Fürstenberg. The church was consecrated in 1133 by the Bishop of Constance. For a long time iron ore was mined and smelted in the nearby Lauchert valley.

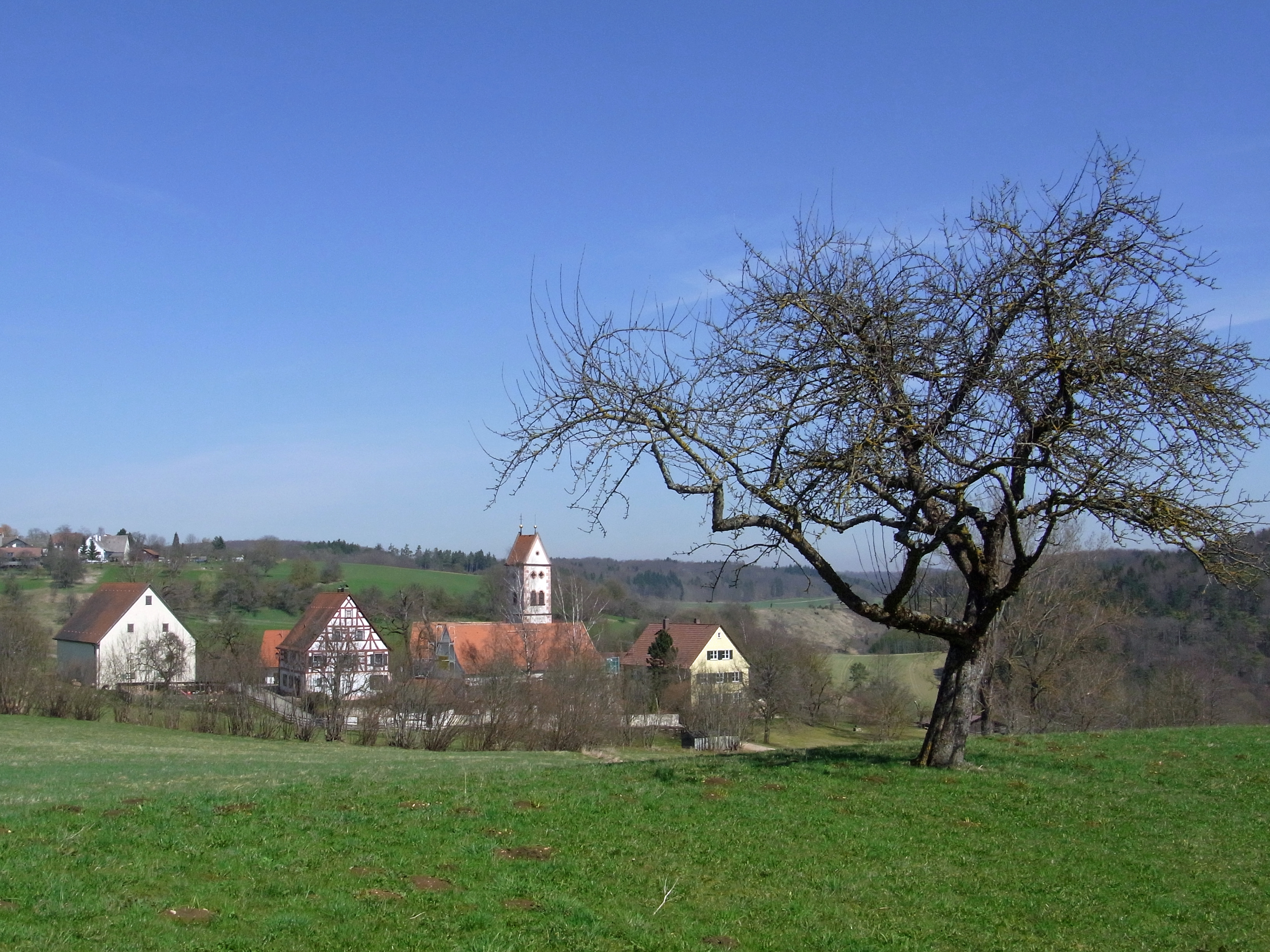
Langenenslingen-Emerfeld

==== Friedingen ====
In 1278 Countess Sophia of Veringen gave an estate from Friedingen to the monastery Heiligkreuztal. In 1286 Count Heinrich von Veringen sold all his possessions from Friedingen to the monastery Kreuztal for 130 silver marks.

==== Ittenhausen ====
Ittenhausen once belonged to the Counts of Veringen, after their extinction to the Counts of Rechberg and in 1447 for a short time to the Counts of Württemberg, who sold it again in 1465. With the resolution of the monastery Zwiefalten in 1803 the place with 200 inhabitants fell to the Duchy, later Kingdom of Württemberg.

==== Unterwilflingen ====
Documented for the first time in 1086, Unterwilflingen once belonged to the Counts of Veringen or the Count of Gruningen-Landau. Many of the local goods came by purchase or donation to the Heiligkreuztal Monastery. The writer Ernst Jünger lived in the local Stauffenberg Forsthaus from 1951 until his death in 1998.

== Governance ==
=== Mayor ===
The mayor of Langenenslingen is Andreas Schneider.

=== Council ===
Mayor Schneider is the head of the council, which besides him has 19 members.

=== Coat of arms ===
A divided blade up in red on green Dreiberg three golden deer feet, bottom in gold three red deer antler above the other. The upper half of the shield corresponds to the seal of the Heinrich von Enslingen from the year 1341. The deer antler in the lower half of the shield relate to the Counts of Veringen as Langenenslingen belonged to the County of Veringen in the 14th century. The coat of arms was granted by the Interior Ministry of Württemberg-Hohenzollern on 28 January 1949.

=== Town twinning ===
Since 1997 there is a partnership with the Polish community of Brzesko.

== Education ==
Langenenslingen has a primary school.

== Demographics ==
Population development:

Year	Inhabitants
1990	3,130
2001	3,516
2011	3,468
2021	3,554

== Attractions ==
=== Museums ===
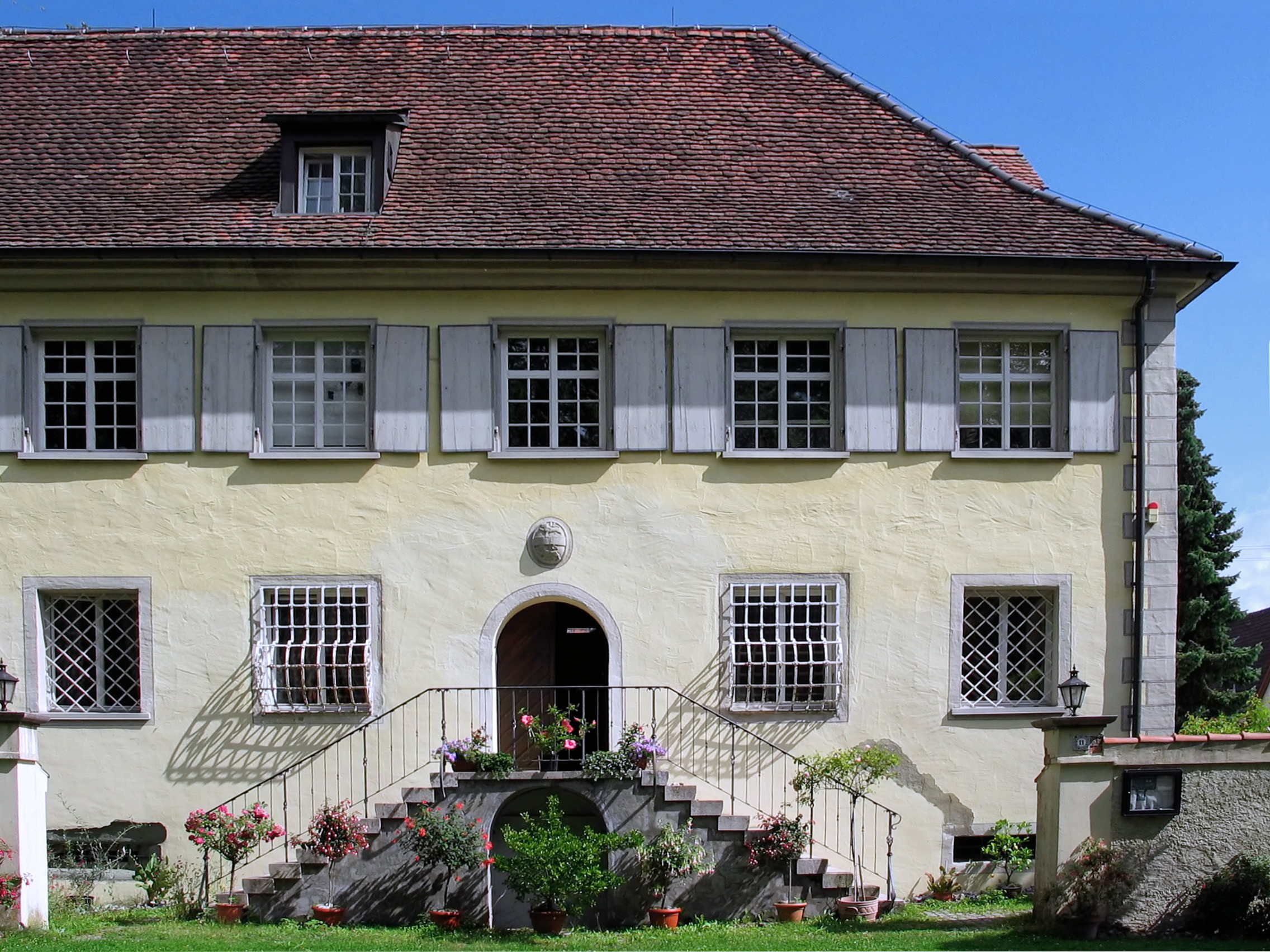
House where Ernst Jünger lived

- Forsthaus (Ernst Jünger House) in Unterwilflingen: Ernst Jünger lived in the Stauffenberg Forsthaus in Unterwilflingen, a Baroque building of 1728, from 1950 until his death in 1998. In 1999, the house was turned into a museum and memorial by the Ernst-Jünger-Foundation.
- Unterwilflingen Castle: The Stauffenberg family have been the owners of Unterwilflingen Castle since 1464. Johann Franz Schenk von Stauffenberg built the current structure in 1710 as a hunting lodge. The Reichstag Vice President Franz August Schenk von Stauffenberg and his son Franz Schenk Freiherr von Stauffenberg established a private library, which now contains about 30,000 volumes. During World War II the castle served as a princely exile and home of the retired Ministers of Vichy France from Sigmaringen.

=== Notable buildings ===
- Alte Burg, remains of a hilltop fortification dating to the Hallstatt period and associated with nearby Heuneburg, a major Celtic settlement.
- Parish church of St. Jakob (St. Jacobus Maior) in Dürrenwaldstetten, Baroque church of 1781/1782 with frescoes by Januarius Zick.
- The church of St. Mauritius in Langenenslingen, was first mentioned in 1266 and expanded in 1736/36. In 1751 the interior was structured and painted.
- The church of St. Konrad in Langenenslingen was built 1889–1893.
- The chapel Maria refuge on the Eichberg bei Langenenslingen was built by returning German soldiers in 1947/48 as prayer and memorial to the fallen and missing persons of World War II.
- Town hall Langenenslingen (former hunting lodge of the Princes of Hohenzollern-Sigmaringen)

== Notable people ==
- Michael Helding (1506–1561), Catholic bishop, scholar, writer and humanist
- Benedikt Sauter (1835–1908), Benedictine Beuron, 1st abbot of Emaus / Prague (1885–1908)
- Fidelis Böhler (1887–1954), car designer, born in Friedingen
- Adalbert Neuburger (1903–1968), born and buried in Egelfingen, educator and university teacher
- Marcel Hepp (1936–1970), leading official of the CSU and publisher of the Bayernkurier
- Robert Hepp (born 1938), sociologist and right-wing author
