= Steffen Vogel =

German politician (born 1974)

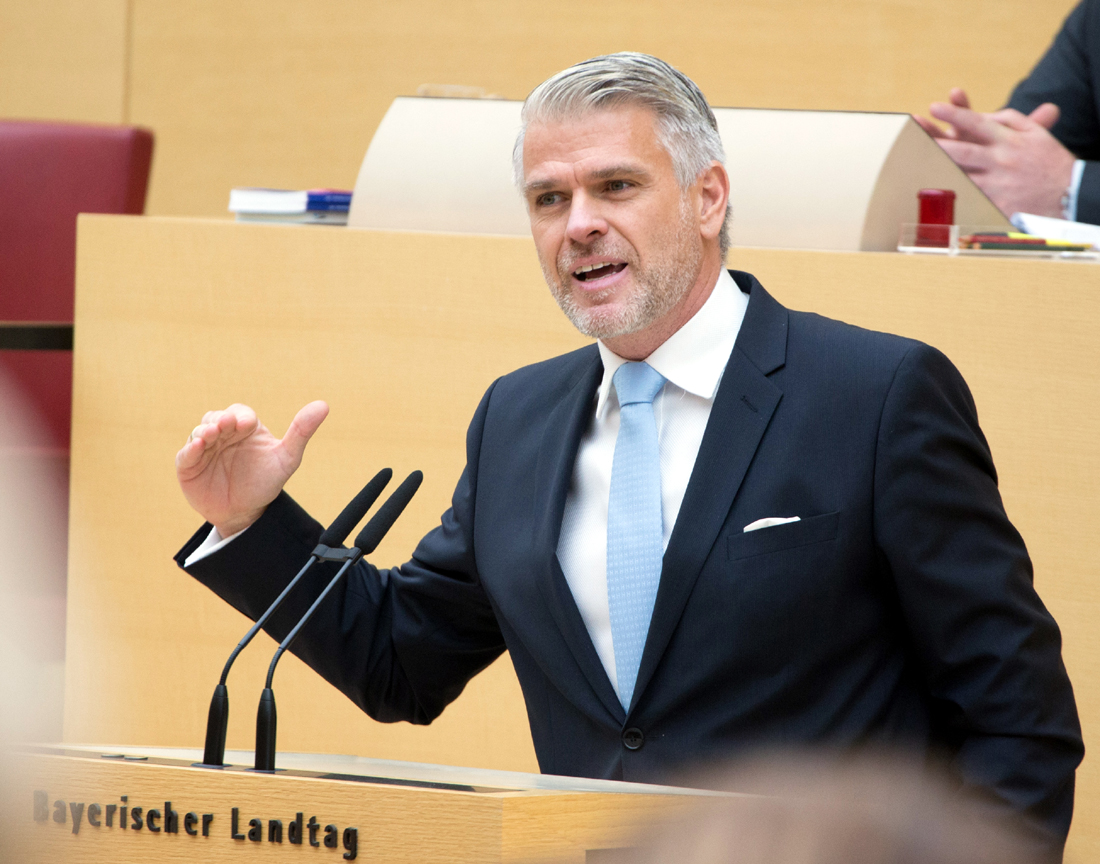
- Vogel in 2019

Member of the Landtag of Bavaria
- Incumbent
- Assumed office 7 October 2013
- Preceded by: Bernd Weiß
- Constituency: Haßberge, Rhön-Grabfeld

Personal details
- Born: 23 June 1974 (age 51) Coburg
- Party: Christian Social Union (since 1994)

Steffen Vogel (born 23 June 1974 in Coburg) is a German politician serving as a member of the Landtag of Bavaria since 2013. He has served as chairman of the Christian Social Union in Lower Franconia since 2022.
