= Walter Kolbenhoff =

Walter Kolbenhoff, born as Walter Hoffman (20 May 1908 – 29 January 1993), was a German novelist.

== Biography ==
Kolbenhoff was born in Berlin, the son of a workman. He became a worker himself and travelled as a vagabond throughout Europe, Turkey and northern Africa. In 1929 he joined the German communist party KPD living in Berlin, where he published his first novels in communist periodicals.

The Hessischer Rundfunk produced a portrait of him in 1980, in which he spoke about his years in Berlin before Hitler came to power. He had to realize that the German communist party in the early 1930s was willing to help bring Hitler to power. Kolbenhoffs words about the KPD were: "Die wollte ja faktisch die Nazis an die Macht bringen um dann die Macht zu übernehmen" ("In fact, they wanted to bring the Nazis to power and then take power"). This was said very unambiguously in the periodical "Die Rote Fahne" of the KPD. It was told to Kolbenhoff and to his comrades, that Hitler would not remain in the government for long time and that a revolution of the working class in Germany would take place that would sweep him away and communist dictatorship would be the unavoidable consequence. Indeed in 1932 during a strike of the transport workers in Berlin the pickets were Rotfront (the KDP's organisation analogous to Hitler's SA) and SA-members side by side. These kind of actions by the German communists can only be explained by a direct order from Joseph Stalin. Walter now has descendants that live in London England

In 1933, he left Germany for Denmark, where he stayed until 1940, with Wilhelm Reich. 1933 in Denmark appeared his novel "Untermenschen" (Undermen) in which he depicted his former life as a vagabond.

As German troops invaded Denmark in 1940 Kolbenhoff received orders from the communist party to go back to Germany and to join the Wehrmacht and to form a red cell. He obeyed, becoming a soldier and took part in the battles in Yugoslavia as well as Italy. In 1944 he was made a prisoner of war by the American troops in the ruins of the monastery at Monte Cassino. As a prisoner of war he got instructions in democratic governance in the USA and was released soon and came back to Berlin. In post war Germany he became a member of the famous Gruppe 47. He translated a lot of crime novels from English into German and wrote one himself about the man-hunt of the French Foreign Legion in Germany under chancellor Konrad Adenauer.

Kolbenhoff died in Germering on 29 January 1993.

== See also ==
- Social fascism
- Wilhelm Hoegner

== Works ==
- "Der Hinterhof", 1930
- "Untermenschen", Copenhague 1933
- "Moderne Balladen", 1936
- "Von unserem Fleisch und Blut", 1947. (about the so-called Werwolf-movement).
- "Heimkehr in die Fremde, 1949
- "Der Kopfjäger",1960, a novel about the man-hunt of the French Foreign Legion.
- "Das Wochenende", 1970. A novel about the German studentic movement in 1968.
- "Das Wochenende", 1984
- "Bilder aus einem Panoptikum. Grotesken und Geschichten" (short stories), 1988.

== Sources ==
- MSN Encarta (German)
- "Meyers Handbuch über die Literatur", Mannheim 1964 (in German)
- "Walter Kolbenhoff", a portrait of the author produced in 1980 by the Hessischer Rundfunk ("Produktion: Thomas Dierks, Buch und Regie: Wilfried F. Schoeller und Herbert Wiesner).
