= Bayernkurier =

Bayernkurier is a defunct German monthly political and news magazine. The magazine was based in Munich and was published between 1950 and November 2019.

== History and profile ==
Bayernkurier was first published on 3 June 1950. Franz Josef Strauß was the founding editor-in-chief of the magazine. It was associated with the Christian Social Union in Bavaria. The magazine was published by a company with the same name and had a right-wing political stance. The headquarters was in Munich. It ended publication on 16 November 2019.

The circulation of Bayernkurier was 79,000 copies in 2005 and fell to 60,800 copies in 2010.
