= Joseph Baumgartner =

German politician (1904–1964)

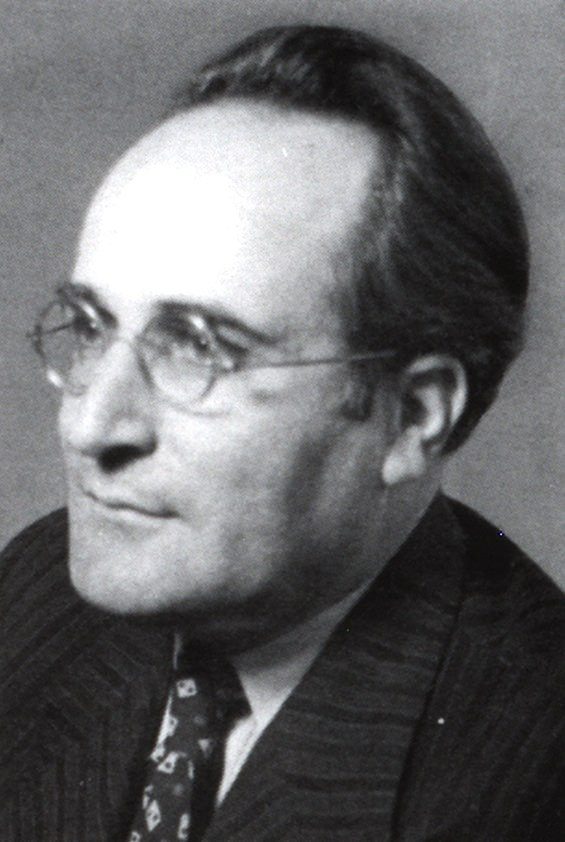
Baumgartner in 1948

Joseph Baumgartner (November 16, 1904 in Sulzemoos – January 21, 1964 in Munich) was a German politician, representative of the Christian Social Union of Bavaria, Bavarian People's Party and the Bavaria Party.

He was a member of the Landtag of Bavaria.

He served as the Bavarian Minister of Agriculture and Forestry in the first Hoegner cabinet and the first Ehard cabinet, during which, he was seen as one of the participants in the "Potato War of 1947" (Kartoffelkrieg von 1947). In the immediate post-war years, Bavaria had to deliver large quantities of potatoes to Berlin. However, the winter of 1946/47 was one of the coldest in German history, being considered the fourth-coldest winter between 1881 and 2020. The crop shortages were further exacerbated by the 1947 drought - whilst Bavarian farmers had trouble feeding themselves during the harsh times, they were still supposed to deliver some of the potatoes. However, Baumgartner called on the farmers to boycott the deliveries, leading to the Bizone Council having Allied soldiers carry out the harvest levies themselves, upon which Baumgartner resigned in protest in December 1947. He then retorted that "Denazification (Entnazifizierung) ought to be followed by "debazification" (Entbazifizierung)" - the repatriation of north German (Prussian) war refugees from Bavaria. In protest of the "Potato War", he resigned from CSU and joined BP. In 1954, when Wilhelm Hoegner (SPD) formed the next Bavarian state government after CSU failed to secure a majority or form a coalition, Hoegner reappointed Baumgartner as Agriculture Minister in his cabinet, where he served until 1957. He died in his home on January 21st, 1964, of a stroke.

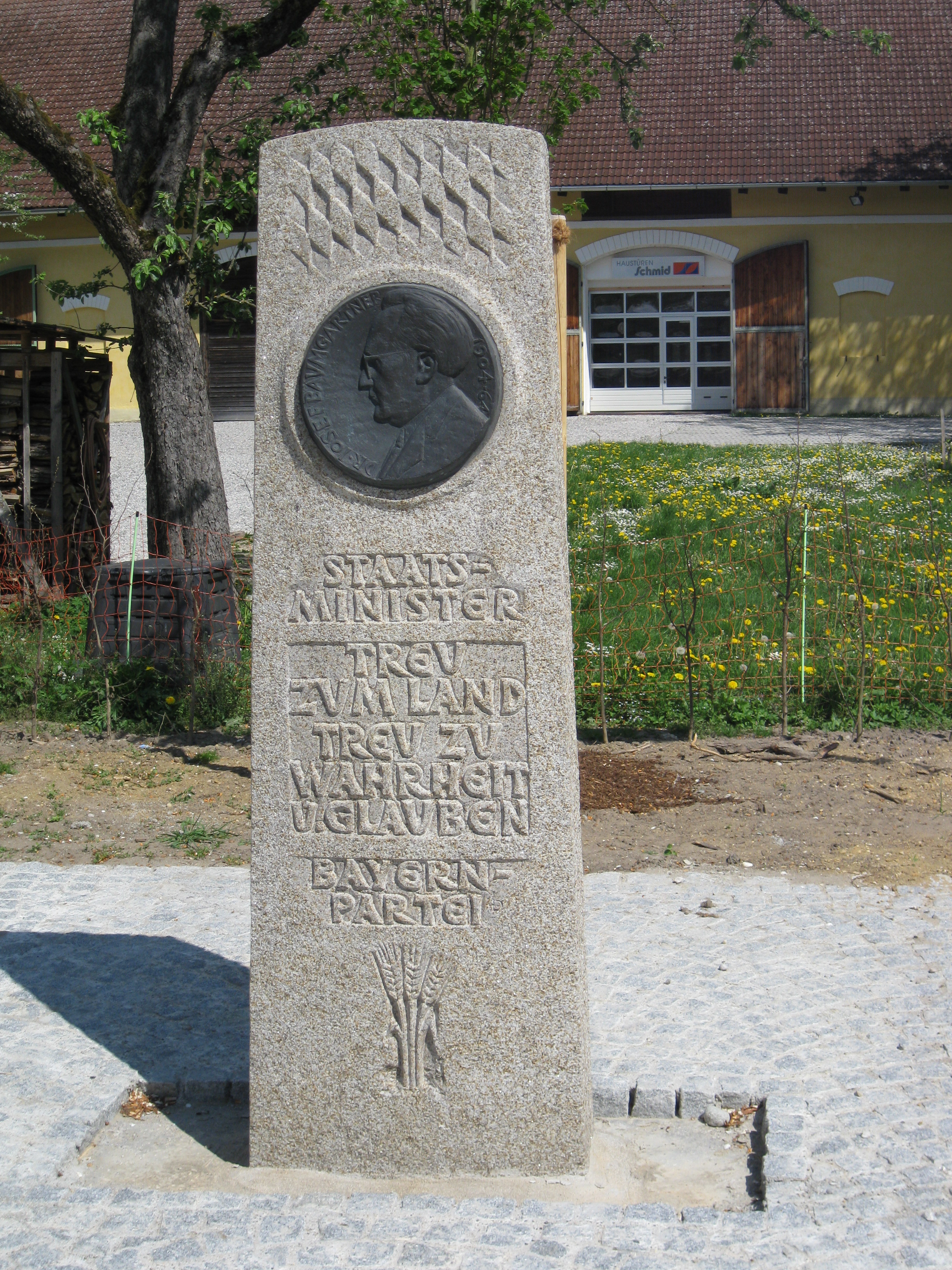
Memorial to Baumgartner in Sulzemoos

== See also ==
- List of Bavarian Christian Social Union politicians
