= Franz Josef Strauss =

German politician (1915–1988)

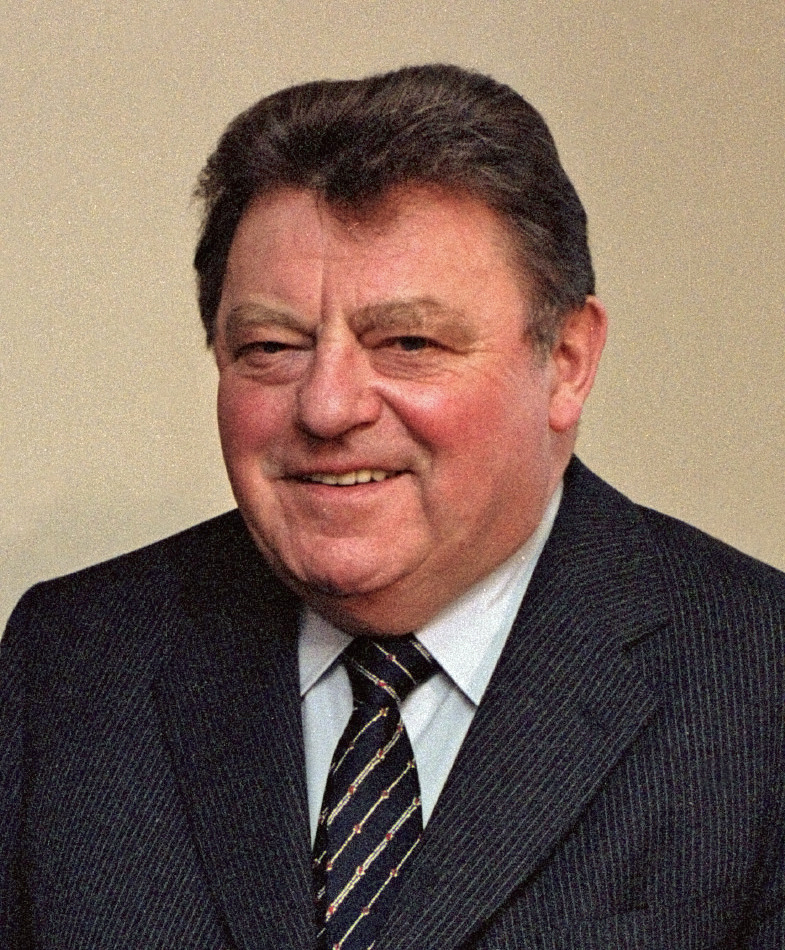
- Strauss in 1982

Minister-President of Bavaria
- In office 6 November 1978 – 3 October 1988
- Deputy: Karl Hillermeier; Max Streibl
- Preceded by: Alfons Goppel
- Succeeded by: Max Streibl

Leader of the Christian Social Union
- In office 18 March 1961 – 3 October 1988
- General Secretary: Friedrich Zimmermann; Anton Jaumann; Max Streibl; Gerold Tandler; Edmund Stoiber; Otto Wiesheu
- Preceded by: Hanns Seidel
- Succeeded by: Theo Waigel
Federal Cabinet
Minister of Finance
In office 2 December 1966 – 22 October 1969
Chancellor	Kurt Georg Kiesinger
Preceded by	Kurt Schmücker
Succeeded by	Alex Möller
Minister of Defence
In office 16 October 1956 – 16 December 1962
Chancellor	Konrad Adenauer
Preceded by	Theodor Blank
Succeeded by	Kai-Uwe von Hassel
Minister for Atomic Affairs
In office 20 October 1955 – 16 October 1956
Chancellor	Konrad Adenauer
Preceded by	Office established
Succeeded by	Siegfried Balke
Minister for Special Affairs
In office 6 October 1953 – 12 October 1955 Serving with Heinrich Krone, Robert Tillmanns, Hermann Schäfer
Chancellor	Konrad Adenauer
Preceded by	Office established
Succeeded by	Heinrich Krone (1961)
Parliamentary constituencies
Member of the Landtag of Bavaria; for Upper Bavaria
In office 30 October 1978 – 3 October 1988
Preceded by	Multi-member district
Succeeded by	Hans Koller
Member of the Bundestag; from Bavaria
In office 18 February 1987 – 19 March 1987
Preceded by	Multi-member district
Succeeded by	Gerda Hasselfeldt
Constituency	State list
In office 7 September 1949 – 29 November 1978
Preceded by	Constituency established
Succeeded by	Heinrich Reichold
Constituency	Weilheim
Member of the European Parliament; for West Germany
In office 1952–1956

President of the Bundesrat
- In office 1 November 1983 – 31 October 1984
- Preceded by: Johannes Rau
- Succeeded by: Lothar Späth

Personal details
- Born: 6 September 1915 Munich, Bavaria, Germany
- Died: 3 October 1988 (aged 73) Regensburg, West Germany
- Party: Christian Social Union (1946–1988)
- Spouse: Marianne Zwicknagl (m. 1957; died 1984)
- Children: 3, including Monika
- Education: LMU Munich
- Occupation: Politician; Teacher; Civil servant
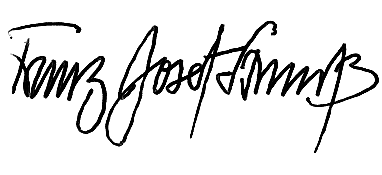
- Signature

Military service
- Allegiance: Germany
- Branch/service: Heer
- Years of service: 1939–1945
- Rank: Oberleutnant
- Battles/wars: World War II; Western Front; Battle of France; Allied invasion of Germany (surrendered); Eastern Front; Siege of Sevastopol; Battle of Stalingrad (WIA)

Franz Josef Strauss (German: Strauß [fʁants ˈjoːzɛf ˈʃtʁaʊs]; 6 September 1915 – 3 October 1988) was a German politician. He was the long-time chairman of the Christian Social Union in Bavaria (CSU) from 1961 until 1988, member of the federal cabinet in different positions between 1953 and 1969 and minister-president of Bavaria from 1978 until 1988. Strauss is also credited as a co-founder of European aerospace conglomerate Airbus.

After the 1969 federal elections, West Germany's CDU/CSU alliance found itself out of power for the first time since the founding of the Federal Republic. At this time, Strauss became more identified with the regional politics of Bavaria. While he ran for the chancellorship as the candidate of the CDU/CSU in 1980, for the rest of his life Strauss never again held federal office. From 1978 until his death in 1988, he was the head of the Bavarian government. His last two decades were marked by a fierce rivalry with CDU chairman Helmut Kohl.

== Early life ==
Born in Munich on 6 September 1915, as the second child of a butcher, Strauss studied German letters, history and economics at the Ludwig-Maximilians-Universität München from 1935 to 1939. He was an active member of a Roman Catholic youth organization that clashed with the Nazi Party. Like most young men in Germany he was called up for military service when war began in 1939. Thanks to his university background he became an officer.

== World War II ==
Strauss in the Heer c. 1939

In World War II, he served in the Wehrmacht on the Western and Eastern Fronts. While on furlough, he passed the German state exams to become a teacher. After suffering from severe frostbite on the Eastern Front in early 1943, he served as an Offizier für wehrgeistige Führung, responsible for the education of the troops, at the antiaircraft artillery school in Altenstadt Air Base, near Schongau. He held the rank of Oberleutnant at the end of the war when he surrendered to American forces.

== Early post-war years ==
In 1945, he served as translator for the U.S. Army. He called himself Franz Strauß until soon after the war, when he started using his middle name Josef as well.

== Early political career (1945–1961) ==
After the war, in 1945, he was appointed deputy Landrat (chief executive and representative of the district) of Schongau by the American military government and was involved in founding the local party organization of the Christian Social Union in Bavaria (CSU). Strauss became a member of the first Bundestag (Federal Parliament) in 1949.

In 1953, Strauss became Federal Minister for Special Affairs in the second cabinet of Chancellor Konrad Adenauer, in 1955, Federal Minister of Nuclear Energy, and in 1956, Defence Minister, charged with the build-up of the new West German defence forces, the Bundeswehr – the youngest man to hold this office at the time. He became chairman of the CSU in 1961.

Strauss stated in a letter to HIAG in March 1957: "I think you know how I personally think about the front-line units of the Waffen-SS. They are included in my admiration for the German soldiers of the last world war."

== Lockheed bribery scandals ==
Former Lockheed lobbyist Ernest Hauser admitted to investigators during a U.S. Senate hearing that Minister of Defence Strauss and his party had received at least $10 million in remuneration for arranging West Germany's purchase of 900 F-104G Starfighters in 1961, which later became part of the Lockheed bribery scandals. The party, its leaders, and Strauss all denied the allegations; and Strauss filed a slander suit against Hauser. Strauss and Hauser had met after World War II in Schongau, Bavaria, where Hauser was stationed. They were good friends, which Strauss later denied, in a denial belied by the fact that Strauss had attended Hauser's wedding. As the allegations were not corroborated, the issue was dropped. It was known at the time that a Senate hearing in the U.S. revealed that Lockheed associates paid Strauss a bribe to purchase the planes, due to Boeing suing Lockheed over the lost German business. In a Senate hearing in the U.S., it was admitted by Lockheed associates that the funds were disbursed to Strauss. In spite of this fact, Strauss was never indicted in Germany due to his influence. Lockheed at that time was on the brink of collapse; the German contract was key to the company's survival. The F-104G's development had been expensive; the U.S. Air Force refused to purchase the plane due to its unnecessary features. The German contract proved to be a windfall for Lockheed. After Germany ordered the fighter planes from Lockheed, many more European governments started to place their trust in the Starfighter and ordered more planes, saving Lockheed from financial ruin.

== Spiegel affair ==
Strauss was forced to step down as defence minister in 1962 in the wake of the Spiegel affair. Rudolf Augstein, owner and editor-in-chief of the influential Der Spiegel magazine, published German defense information that Strauss's department alleged was top secret. He was arrested on Strauss's request and was held for 103 days. On 19 November, the five FDP ministers of the cabinet resigned, demanding that Strauss be fired. This put Chancellor Adenauer himself at risk. He found himself publicly accused of backing the suppression of a critical press with the resources of the state. Strauss had no choice but to admit that he had lied to the parliament, and was forced to resign. Strauss himself was exonerated by the courts on the charge of acting against the constitution.

== Rivalry between Kohl and Strauss ==
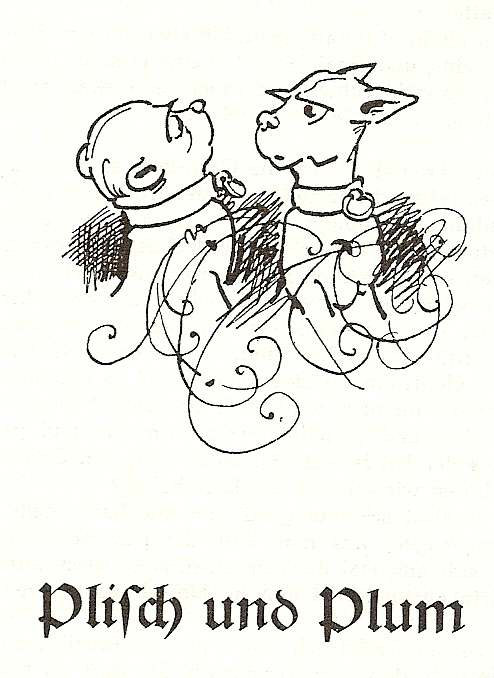
F. J. Strauß, K. Schiller

Strauss was appointed minister of the treasury again in 1966, in the cabinet of Kurt Georg Kiesinger. In cooperation with the SPD minister for economy, Karl Schiller, he developed a groundbreaking economic stability policy; the two ministers, quite unlike in physical appearance and political background, were popularly dubbed Plisch und Plum, after two dogs in a 19th-century cartoon by Wilhelm Busch.

After the SPD was able to form a government without the conservatives, in 1969, Strauss became one of the most vocal critics of Willy Brandt's Ostpolitik. After Helmut Kohl's first run for chancellor in 1976 failed, Strauss cancelled the alliance between the CDU and CSU parties in the Bundestag, a decision which he reversed only months later when the CDU threatened to extend their party to Bavaria (where the CSU holds a political monopoly for the conservatives). In the 1980 federal election, the CDU/CSU opted to nominate Strauss as their candidate for chancellor. Strauss had continued to be critical of Kohl's leadership, so providing Strauss a shot at the chancellery may have been seen as an endorsement of either Strauss' policies or style (or both) over Kohl's. But many, if not most, observers at the time believed that the CDU had concluded that Helmut Schmidt's SPD was likely unbeatable in 1980, and felt that they had nothing to lose in running Strauss. Schmidt's victory was seen by Kohl's supporters as a vindication of their man, and though the rivalry between Kohl and Strauss persisted for years, once the CDU/CSU was able to take power in 1982, it was Kohl who became chancellor. He remained in power well beyond Strauss's death.

== European integration ==
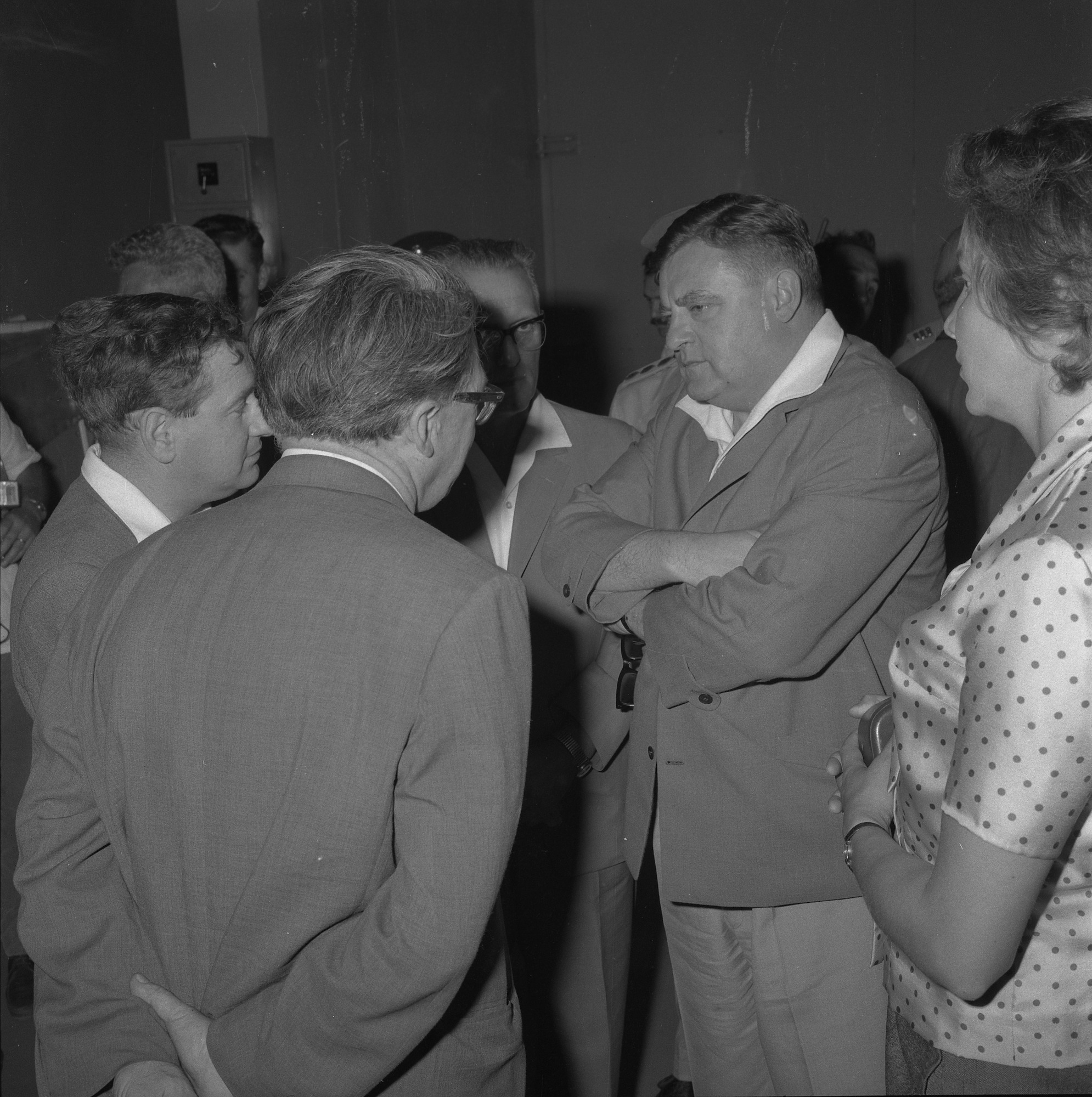
Strauss during a 1963 visit to Israel

Strauss wrote a book called The Grand Design, in which he set forth his views of how the future unification of Europe might be achieved. He was part of the secret paneuropean conservative network Le Cercle that promoted his political career.

== Airbus ==
As an aerospace enthusiast, Strauss was a key player in the creation of Airbus in the 1970s. He served as chairman of the company. in the late 1980s, until his death in 1988; he saw the company win a lucrative but controversial (see Airbus affair) contract to supply planes to Air Canada just before his death. Munich's new airport, the Franz Josef Strauß Airport, was named after him in 1992.

== Minister-President of Bavaria (1978-1988) ==
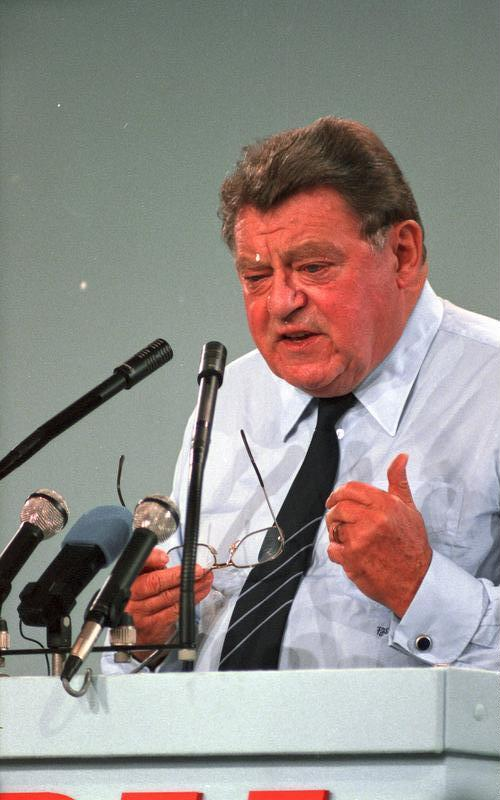
Strauss addressing the CDU in 1986, two years before his death

From 1978 until his death in 1988, Strauss was Minister-President of Bavaria, serving his rotation as president of the German Bundesrat in 1983–84. After his defeat in the 1980 federal election, he retreated to commenting on federal politics from Bavaria. Strauss admired the history of the defunct Bavarian monarchy, but did not want it restored. He became the most visible critic of Kohl's politics in his own political camp, even after Kohl ascended to the chancellorship. In 1983, Strauss was primarily responsible for a loan of 3 billion Deutsche Marks given to East Germany. This move, in violation of longtime CSU/CDU policy to allow the East German economy to collapse naturally, was widely criticised even during Strauss's lifetime. The Republicans split from the CSU/CDU over this move.

== Wackersdorf nuclear reprocessing plant (WAA) ==
Strauß campaigned vehemently for the construction of the Wackersdorf nuclear reprocessing plant (WAA) in Wackersdorf (Bavaria), which was accompanied by strong protests from the population, which he described as "hardly more dangerous than a bicycle spoke factory".

The ecclesiastical resistance in particular, which met primarily at the Franziskus-Marterl, was a nuisance for Strauss and he said that "anyone who confuses people, whoever causes them to feel insecure, excited and afraid for no reason, is doing the work of the devil".

== Visit to Albania ==
Strauss visited communist Albania on 21 August 1984, while Enver Hoxha, the ruler from the end of World War II until his death in 1985, was still in power. Strauss was one of the few Western leaders, if not the only one, to visit the isolationist Albania in decades. This fuelled speculation that Strauss might be preparing the way for diplomatic links between Albania and West Germany and, indeed, relations were established in 1987.

In 2017, Strauss was honored with the Albanian National Flag Order, while a city square holds his name in Tirana.

== Death ==
On 1 October 1988, Strauss collapsed while out hunting with Johannes, 11th Prince of Thurn and Taxis, in the Thurn and Taxis forests, east of Regensburg. He died in a Regensburg hospital on 3 October without having regained consciousness. He was 73.

== Family ==
Strauss married Marianne Zwicknagl in 1957. She died in a car accident in 1984. They had three children: Maximilan Josef, Franz Georg, and Monika, who was member of the Landtag of Bavaria and a Bavarian minister. In 2009 she was elected to the European Parliament.

== Legacy ==
Strauss shaped post-war Bavaria and polarized the public like few others. He was an articulate leader of conservatives and a skilled rhetorician. His outspoken right-leaning political standpoints made him an opponent of more moderate politicians and the entire political left. His association with several large-scale scandals made many politicians distance themselves from him. His policies contributed to changing Bavaria from an agrarian state to one of Germany's leading industry centres, and one of the wealthiest regions of Germany.

British diplomat and academic Richard Hiscocks wrote in 1966:

Strauss is without doubt one of the most remarkable personalities that has yet emerged in Germany since the war and, from a democratic point of view, the most dangerous…. he has great ambition and combines with it the advantages of considerable intellectual gifts, an exceptional memory, immense resilience and capacity for work, and the ability to make quick decisions....On the other hand, these positive qualities are offset by equally pronounced defects. The unscrupulousness of his political methods exceeds even Adenauer’s and is not counterbalanced, as with Adenauer, by good judgment and serenity of manner. Above all he is lacking in self-control and knowledge of men, and has the habit of picking weak and sycophantic companions....His quick decisions therefore have often been the wrong ones. Martin Walser once wrote of him, “He can defend us against everything, only not against himself.”
