= Wilhelm Hoegner =

German politician (1887–1980)

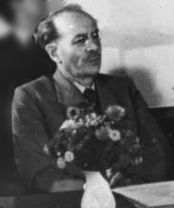
- Wilhelm Hoegner (1947)

Minister President of Bavaria
- In office 14 December 1954 – 8 October 1957
- President: Theodor Heuss
- Chancellor: Konrad Adenauer
- Preceded by: Hans Ehard
- Succeeded by: Hanns Seidel
- In office 28 September 1945 – 16 December 1946
- Preceded by: Fritz Schäffer
- Succeeded by: Hans Ehard

Minister of the Interior of Bavaria
- In office 18 December 1950 – 14 December 1954
- Preceded by: Willi Ankermüller
- Succeeded by: August Geislhöringer

Minister of Justice of Bavaria
- In office 28 September 1945 – 20 September 1947
- Preceded by: Hans Ehard
- Succeeded by: Josef Müller

Personal details
- Born: 23 September 1887 Munich, Kingdom of Bavaria, German Empire
- Died: 5 March 1980 (aged 92) Munich, Bavaria, West Germany
- Party: Social Democratic Party
- Spouse: Anna Woock (m. 1918)
- Children: 2
- Education: University of Erlangen–Nuremberg
- Occupation: Lawyer

Wilhelm Johann Harald Hoegner (23 September 1887 – 5 March 1980) was the second Bavarian minister-president after World War II (1945–1946 and 1954–1957), and the father of the Bavarian constitution. He has been the only Social Democrat to hold this office since 1920.

== Early life ==
Wilhelm Hoegner was born in Munich in 1887, the son of Michael Georg Hoegner and Therese Engelhardt. Growing up in Burghausen, he studied law at the Ludwig-Maximilians-Universität München, the Friedrich Wilhelm University of Berlin, and the University of Erlangen–Nuremberg. After graduation, he worked as a lawyer, then as a Staatsanwalt, a state prosecutor. In 1919, he became a member of the SPD. He married Anna Woock in 1918, with whom he had two children.

== Interwar politics and exile ==
From 1924 to 1930, Hoegner was a Social Democratic member of the Landtag of Bavaria. He was involved in the investigation into Hitler's Beer Hall Putsch in 1923 and through this became part of the opposition to the Nazis. He published, anonymously, a paper on the findings of the investigation, which is considered an important historical document due to the fact that the Nazis destroyed all official reports from the inquest after 1933. He actively opposed Hitler in his time as a member of the German Reichstag from 1930 to 1933. For this reason, he was dismissed from government service after the Nazi takeover in 1933 and had to escape to Austria, and from there, in 1934, to Switzerland, where he worked as a freelance writer. He was in contact there with other German refugees from the Nazis and worked with them in an organisation called Demokratisches Deutschland, aimed against the Nazis.

== Postwar politics ==
Upon his return to Bavaria in June 1945, he served at the court in Munich. He became minister-president of Bavaria from 1945 to 1946, after the sudden dismissal of Fritz Schäffer, also holding the post of Minister of Justice until 1947. He became known at this time as the father of the new Bavarian constitution. After losing the December 1946 election, he was replaced as Bavarian minister-president by Hans Ehard but remained as Minister of Justice. When his party decided to leave the coalition with the Christian Social Union (CSU), he opposed this move and temporarily lost influence within the SPD, resigning from his ministerial post. In October 1946 he served as one of two German witnesses at the execution of the war criminals sentenced to death by the International Military Tribunal (the Nuremberg Tribunal).

From 1946 to 1970, he was again a member of the Bavarian Landtag (parliament), leading the SPD faction there from 1958 to 1962. He held the post of Minister of the Interior from 1950 to 1954, when Bavaria was ruled by a CSU-SPD coalition. During this time, he devoted a great deal of effort towards the reunification of the Palatinate with the rest of Bavaria, but ultimately failed, as only 7.6 percent of all eligible voters in the Palatinate voted for reunification.

He became minister-president of Bavaria for a second time in 1954, when he led a four-party grand coalition government until 1957. The coalition fell apart before the end of its term after the 1957 federal elections and, as of 2023, Wilhelm Hoegner is still the last non-CSU minister-president of Bavaria.

He was also a member of the German Bundestag from 1961 to 1962.

While a social democrat, Hoegner was not a doctrinaire socialist, and he always preferred a common-sense approach to politics and the economy, rather than radical theories. He considered being a social democrat to be wholly compatible with Christian ethics and values—an important factor in the traditionally conservative and Catholic-dominated state of Bavaria.

Hoegner died, aged 92, almost blind but mentally still in full capacity, on 5 March 1980 in Munich.

== Honours ==
- Grand Cross of the Order of Merit of the Federal Republic of Germany (1953)
- Knight Grand Cross of the Order of Merit of the Italian Republic (1956)
- Grand Decoration of Honour in Silver with Sash for Services to the Republic of Austria (1957)
- Honorary doctorate at the Ludwig-Maximilians-Universität München

== Works ==
- Die verratene Republik (in German), by Wilhelm Hoegner, Munich, 1979.
- Der Volksbetrug der Nationalsozialisten (in German), by Wilhelm Hoegner
- Der Schwierige Außenseiter: Erinnerungen eines Abgeordneten, Emigranten und Ministerpräsidenten (in German), by Wilhelm Hoegner, Munich, publisher: Isar Verlag, 1959

== See also ==
- List of minister-presidents of Bavaria
- Walter Kolbenhoff

Political offices
| Preceded by Fritz Schäffer | Minister-President of Bavaria; 1945 – 1946 | Succeeded by Hans Ehard |
| Preceded by Hans Ehard | Minister-President of Bavaria; 1954 – 1957 | Succeeded by Hanns Seidel |
