= List of minister-presidents of Bavaria =

Minister-President of Bavaria
- Ministerpräsident des Freistaates Bayern
- Coat of arms of Bavaria

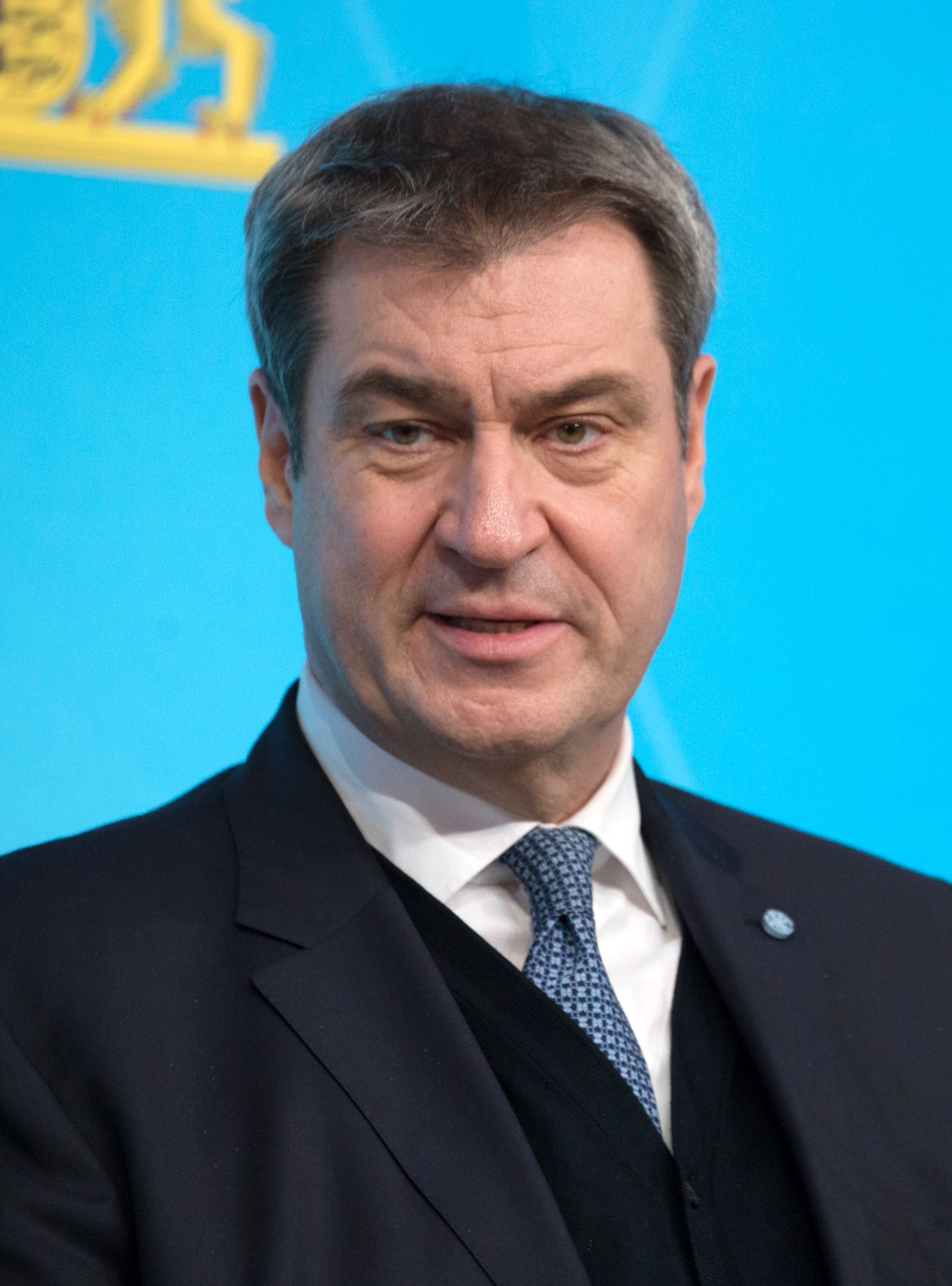
- Incumbent; Markus Söder since 16 March 2018
- Residence: Prinz-Carl-Palais, Munich (official residence); Bavarian State Chancellery, Munich (executive office)
- Appointer: Landtag of Bavaria
- Term length: Pending resignation or the election of a successor
- Inaugural holder: Kurt Eisner
- Formation: 8 November 1918; 107 years ago
- Salary: regulated by legislation
- Website: Official website

Below is a list of the men who have served in the capacity of minister-president or equivalent office in the German state of Bavaria from the 17th century to the present.

== Privy Council chancellor ==
Privy Council chancellors (Geheime Ratskanzler) were:

Portrait	Name (Birth–Death)	Term of office			Note
Portrait	Name (Birth–Death)	Took office	Left office	Time in office	Note
	Johann Adlzreiter von Tettenweis (1596–1662)	1650	11 May 1662	12 years	
	Johann Georg Oexle (1605–1675)	11 May 1662	1667	c. 5 years	
	Kaspar von Schmid (1622–1693)	1667	3 September 1693	c. 26 years	
	Johann Rudolf von Wämpl (1638–1704)	1695	9 December 1704	c. 9 years	
	Franz Xaver Josef von Unertl (1675–1750)	3 March 1726	6 March 1749	23 years, 3 days	
	Franz Xaver Andreas von Praidlohn (1689–1757)	7 March 1749	20 September 1758	9 years, 197 days	
	Wiguläus von Kreittmayr (1705–1790)	20 September 1758	21 October 1790	32 years, 31 days	
	Johann Friedrich von Hertling (1729–1806)	21 October 1790	13 February 1806	15 years, 115 days	

== Ministers of foreign affairs ==
Before 1849, Bavaria had no actual head of government, but the minister of foreign affairs was the most senior of the ministers. In 1806, the office was given to the minister of the Royal House and of foreign affairs.

Portrait	Name (Birth–Death)	Term of office			Note
Portrait	Name (Birth–Death)	Took office	Left office	Time in office	Note
Electorate of Bavaria (until 1805)
Part of the Holy Roman Empire
1	Maximilian Franz Joseph von Berchem (1702–1777)	1745	18 November 1777	c. 32 years	
2	Matthäus von Vieregg (1719–1802)	18 November 1777	21 February 1799	21 years, 95 days	
3	Maximilian Graf von Montgelas (1759–1838)	21 February 1799	26 December 1805	6 years, 308 days	
Kingdom of Bavaria (1805–1918)
3	Maximilian Graf von Montgelas (1759–1838)	26 December 1805	2 February 1817	11 years, 38 days	
4	Heinrich Alois von Reigersberg (1770–1865)	2 February 1817	1823	c. 5 years	
5	Aloys Graf von Rechberg und Rothenlöwen (1766–1849)	2 Februar 1817	13 Oktober 1825	8 years, 253 days	
6	Friedrich Karl von Thürheim (1763–1832)	1 Januar 1827	28 April 1827	117 days	
7	Georg Friedrich von Zentner (1752–1835)	28 April 1827	1 September 1828	1 year, 132 days	
8	Josef Ludwig von Armansperg (1787–1853)	1 September 1828	31 December 1831	3 years, 121 days	
9	Friedrich August von Gise (1783–1860)	2 January 1832	26 May 1846	14 years, 144 days	
10	Count; Otto von Bray-Steinburg (1807–1899)	26 May 1846	13 February 1847	263 days	
11	Georg Ludwig von Maurer (1790–1872)	1 March 1847	29 November 1847	273 days	
12	Ludwig von Oettingen-Wallerstein (1791–1870)	1 December 1847	12 March 1848	102 days	
13	Klemens August Graf von Waldkirch (1806–1858)	14 March 1848	29 April 1848	46 days	
14	Count; Otto von Bray-Steinburg (1807–1899)	29 April 1848	18 April 1849	354 days	

== Chairmen of the Council of Ministers ==
The office of Chairman of the Council of Ministers was established in 1849. With one exception (1880–1890), the chairman was always the foreign minister.

Portrait	Name (Birth–Death)	Term of office			Political party
Portrait	Name (Birth–Death)	Took office	Left office	Time in office	Political party
15/1	Baron; Ludwig von der Pfordten (1811–1880)	22 December 1849	1 May 1859	9 years, 130 days	Non-partisan
16/2	Karl von Schrenck von Notzing (1806–1884)	1 May 1859	4 October 1864	5 years, 156 days	Non-partisan
17/3	Max von Neumayr (1808–1881)	4 October 1864	4 December 1864	61 days	Non-partisan
18/4	Baron; Ludwig von der Pfordten (1811–1880)	4 December 1864	29 December 1866	2 years, 25 days	Non-partisan
19/5	Chlodwig zu Hohenlohe-Schillingsfürst (1819–1901)	31 December 1866	7 March 1870	3 years, 66 days	Non-partisan
20/6	Count; Otto von Bray-Steinburg (1807–1899)	8 March 1870	18 January 1871	316 days	Non-partisan
Kingdom of Bavaria (1871–1918)
State of the German Reich during the period of the German Empire.
(20/6)	Count; Otto von Bray-Steinburg (1807–1899)	18 January 1871	25 June 1871	158 days	Non-partisan
21/7	Friedrich von Hegnenberg-Dux (1810–1872)	21 August 1871	2 June 1872	286 days	Non-partisan
22/8	Adolph von Pfretzschner (1820–1901)	1 October 1872	4 March 1880	7 years, 155 days	Non-partisan
9	Johann von Lutz (1826–1890)	4 March 1880	1 June 1890	10 years, 89 days	Non-partisan
23/10	Friedrich Krafft Graf von Crailsheim (1841–1926)	1 June 1890	1 March 1903	12 years, 273 days	Non-partisan
24/11	Clemens von Podewils-Dürniz (1850–1922)	1 March 1903	9 February 1912	8 years, 345 days	Non-partisan
25/12	Georg von Hertling (1843–1919)	9 February 1912	10 November 1917	5 years, 274 days	Centre Party
26/13	Otto Ritter von Dandl (1868–1942)	11 November 1917	7 November 1918	361 days	Non-partisan

== Minister-presidents ==
=== Free State of Bavaria (1918–1945) ===
Minister-President of the Free State of Bavaria

Political party: USPD SPD BVP NSDAP None

Portrait	Name (Birth–Death)	Term of office			Political party
Portrait	Name (Birth–Death)	Took office	Left office	Time in office	Political party
Free State of Bavaria (1918–1933)
State of the German Reich during the period of the Weimar Republic.
1	Kurt Eisner (1867–1919)	8 November 1918	21 February 1919 †	105 days	Independent Social Democratic Party
–	Martin Segitz (1853–1927); Acting	1 March 1919	17 March 1919	16 days	Social Democratic Party
2	Johannes Hoffmann (1867–1930)	17 March 1919	16 March 1920	365 days	Social Democratic Party
3	Gustav Ritter von Kahr (1862–1934)	16 March 1920	21 September 1921	1 year, 189 days	Bavarian People's Party
4	Hugo Graf von Lerchenfeld-Köfering (1871–1944)	21 September 1921	8 November 1922	1 year, 48 days	Bavarian People's Party
5	Eugen Ritter von Knilling (1856–1927)	8 November 1922	1 July 1924	1 year, 236 days	Bavarian People's Party
–	Gustav Ritter von Kahr (1862–1934) as Generalstaatskommissar	25 September 1923	17 February 1924	145 days	Bavarian People's Party
6	Heinrich Held (1868–1938)	2 July 1924	30 January 1933	8 years, 212 days	Bavarian People's Party
Free State of Bavaria (1933–1945)
State of the German Reich during the period of Nazi Germany.
(6)	Heinrich Held (1868–1938)	30 January 1933	9 March 1933	38 days	Bavarian People's Party
7	Franz Ritter von Epp (1868–1947)	Reichskommissar		31 days	Nazi Party
7	Franz Ritter von Epp (1868–1947)	10 March 1933	10 April 1933	31 days	Nazi Party
7	Franz Ritter von Epp (1868–1947)	Reichsstatthalter		12 years, 19 days	Nazi Party
7	Franz Ritter von Epp (1868–1947)	10 April 1933	29 April 1945	12 years, 19 days	Nazi Party
8	Ludwig Siebert (1874–1942)	12 April 1933	1 November 1942 †	9 years, 203 days	Nazi Party
9	Paul Giesler (1895–1945)	2 November 1942	29 April 1945	2 years, 178 days	Nazi Party

=== Free State of Bavaria (since 1945) ===
Minister-President of Free State of Bavaria

Political party: CSU SPD

Portrait	Name (Birth–Death)	Term of office			Political party	Cabinet
Portrait	Name (Birth–Death)	Took office	Left office	Time in office	Political party	Cabinet
1	Fritz Schäffer (1888–1967)	28 May 1945	28 September 1945	123 days	Independent (Note: During the Weimar Republic, Schäffer was a member of the Bavarian People's Party, which had been dissolved in 1933. The successor party, the CSU, was only founded in October 1945, after Schäffer's term of office, so that he was formally independent during his term of office.)	I
2	Wilhelm Hoegner (1887–1980); 1st term	28 September 1945	16 December 1946	1 year, 79 days	SPD	I
3	Hans Ehard (1887–1980); 1st term	21 December 1946	14 December 1954	7 years, 358 days	CSU	I II III
4	Wilhelm Hoegner (1887–1980); 2nd term	14 December 1954	8 October 1957 (resigned)	2 years, 298 days	SPD	II
5	Hanns Seidel (1901–1961)	16 October 1957	22 January 1960 (resigned)	2 years, 98 days	CSU	I II
6	Hans Ehard (1887–1980); 2nd term	26 January 1960	11 December 1962	2 years, 319 days	CSU	IV
7	Alfons Goppel (1905–1991)	11 December 1962	6 November 1978	15 years, 330 days	CSU	I II III IV
8	Franz Josef Strauß (1915–1988)	6 November 1978	3 October 1988 (died in office)	9 years, 332 days	CSU	I II III
Deputy Minister-President Max Streibl and President of the Landtag Franz Heubl (both CSU) served together as acting minister-presidents from 3 to 19 October 1988.
9	Max Streibl (1932–1998)	19 October 1988	28 May 1993 (resigned)	4 years, 221 days	CSU	I II
10	Edmund Stoiber (born 1941)	28 May 1993	9 October 2007 (resigned)	14 years, 135 days	CSU	I II III IV
11	Günther Beckstein (born 1943)	9 October 2007	27 October 2008	1 year, 18 days	CSU	I
12	Horst Seehofer (born 1949)	27 October 2008	13 March 2018 (resigned)	9 years, 140 days	CSU	I II
Deputy Minister-President Ilse Aigner and President of the Landtag Barbara Stamm (both CSU) served together as acting minister-presidents from 13 to 16 March 2018.
13	Markus Söder (born 1967)	16 March 2018	Incumbent	8 years, 175 days	CSU	I II III

== Longest-serving minister-presidents ==
The following table lists all minister-presidents of the Free State of Bavaria (since 1945) ranked by their length of tenure, with the incumbent minister-president's tenure automatically updating daily.

Rank	Minister-President	Length of tenure(s)	Timespan(s)	Party
1	Alfons Goppel	15 years, 331 days	1962–1978	CSU
2	Edmund Stoiber	14 years, 134 days	1993–2007	CSU
3	Hans Ehard	10 years, 320 days 8 years, 0 days + 2 years, 320 days	1946–1954; 1960–1962	CSU
4	Franz Josef Strauß	9 years, 331 days	1978–1988	CSU
5	Horst Seehofer	9 years, 137 days	2008–2018	CSU
6	Markus Söder	8 years, 175 days	2018–present	CSU
7	Max Streibl	4 years, 221 days	1988–1993	CSU
8	Wilhelm Hoegner	4 years, 13 days 1 year, 79 days + 2 years, 299 days	1945–1946; 1954–1957	SPD
9	Hanns Seidel	2 years, 101 days	1957–1960	CSU
10	Günther Beckstein	1 year, 18 days	2007–2008	CSU
11	Fritz Schäffer	123 days	1945	CSU

Notes:

- Green indicates the current incumbent minister-president
- Söder's rank will rise as his tenure continues
- Hans Ehard and Wilhelm Hoegner each served two non-consecutive terms; combined totals are shown

== Minister-presidents by party ==
The following table summarizes minister-presidents of the Free State of Bavaria (since 1945) grouped by political party.

Party	Total time in office	Number of minister-presidents	Minister-Presidents
**CSU; Christian Social Union**	**77 years, 62 days (+ ongoing)**	9	Fritz Schäffer, Hans Ehard, Hanns Seidel, Alfons Goppel, Franz Josef Strauß, Max Streibl, Edmund Stoiber, Günther Beckstein, Horst Seehofer, **Markus Söder**
SPD; Social Democratic Party	**4 years, 13 days**	1	Wilhelm Hoegner

Notes:

- Green indicates the party of the current incumbent minister-president
- Bold name indicates the current incumbent minister-president
- CSU total time includes the ongoing tenure of Markus Söder
- Fritz Schäffer was a member of the BVP (Bavarian People's Party) before the war; he co-founded the CSU in 1945

== Age-related statistics ==
The following table shows age-related data for all minister-presidents of the Free State of Bavaria since 1945, with living minister-presidents' ages automatically updating.

Minister-President	Born	Age at start of office	Age at end of office	Post-office timespan	Died	Lifespan
Fritz Schäffer (1st term)	12 May 1888	**57 years, 16 days** 28 May 1945	**57 years, 139 days** 28 September 1945	21 years, 182 days	29 March 1967	78 years, 321 days
Wilhelm Hoegner (1st term)	23 September 1887	**58 years, 5 days** 28 September 1945	**59 years, 84 days** 16 December 1946	7 years, 363 days	5 March 1980	92 years, 164 days
Hans Ehard (1st term)	10 November 1887	**59 years, 36 days** 16 December 1946	**67 years, 34 days** 14 December 1954	5 years, 43 days	18 October 1980	92 years, 343 days
Wilhelm Hoegner (2nd term)	23 September 1887	**67 years, 82 days** 14 December 1954	**70 years, 15 days** 8 October 1957	22 years, 149 days	5 March 1980	92 years, 164 days
Hanns Seidel	12 October 1901	**56 years, 4 days** 16 October 1957	**58 years, 105 days** 25 January 1960	—	5 August 1961	59 years, 297 days
Hans Ehard (2nd term)	10 November 1887	**72 years, 77 days** 26 January 1960	**75 years, 31 days** 11 December 1962	17 years, 312 days	18 October 1980	92 years, 343 days
Alfons Goppel	1 October 1905	**57 years, 71 days** 11 December 1962	**73 years, 37 days** 7 November 1978	13 years, 47 days	24 December 1991	86 years, 84 days
Franz Josef Strauß	6 September 1915	**63 years, 62 days** 7 November 1978	**73 years, 27 days** 3 October 1988	—	3 October 1988	73 years, 27 days
Max Streibl	6 January 1932	**56 years, 287 days** 19 October 1988	**61 years, 142 days** 28 May 1993	5 years, 197 days	11 December 1998	66 years, 339 days
Edmund Stoiber	28 September 1941	**51 years, 242 days** 28 May 1993	**66 years, 11 days** 9 October 2007	18 years, 333 days	—	84 years, 344 days
Günther Beckstein	23 November 1943	**63 years, 320 days** 9 October 2007	**64 years, 339 days** 27 October 2008	17 years, 315 days	—	82 years, 288 days
Horst Seehofer	4 July 1949	**59 years, 115 days** 27 October 2008	**68 years, 252 days** 13 March 2018	8 years, 178 days	—	77 years, 65 days
**Markus Söder**	5 January 1967	**51 years, 70 days** 16 March 2018	Incumbent			59 years, 245 days

Notes:

- Light green indicates living former minister-presidents
- Green indicates the current incumbent minister-president
- Hans Ehard and Wilhelm Hoegner each served two non-consecutive terms; both are shown separately
- Hanns Seidel and Franz Josef Strauß died in office, hence "—" for post-office timespan
- Living minister-presidents' post-office timespan and lifespan automatically update daily

== Graphical representation ==
This is a graphical lifespan timeline of the minister-presidents of Bavaria since 1945. They are listed in order of first assuming office.

The following chart shows minister-presidents by their age (living minister-presidents in green), with the years of their time in office in color.

== See also ==
- List of rulers of Bavaria
