= Hanns Seidel =

German politician (1901–1961)

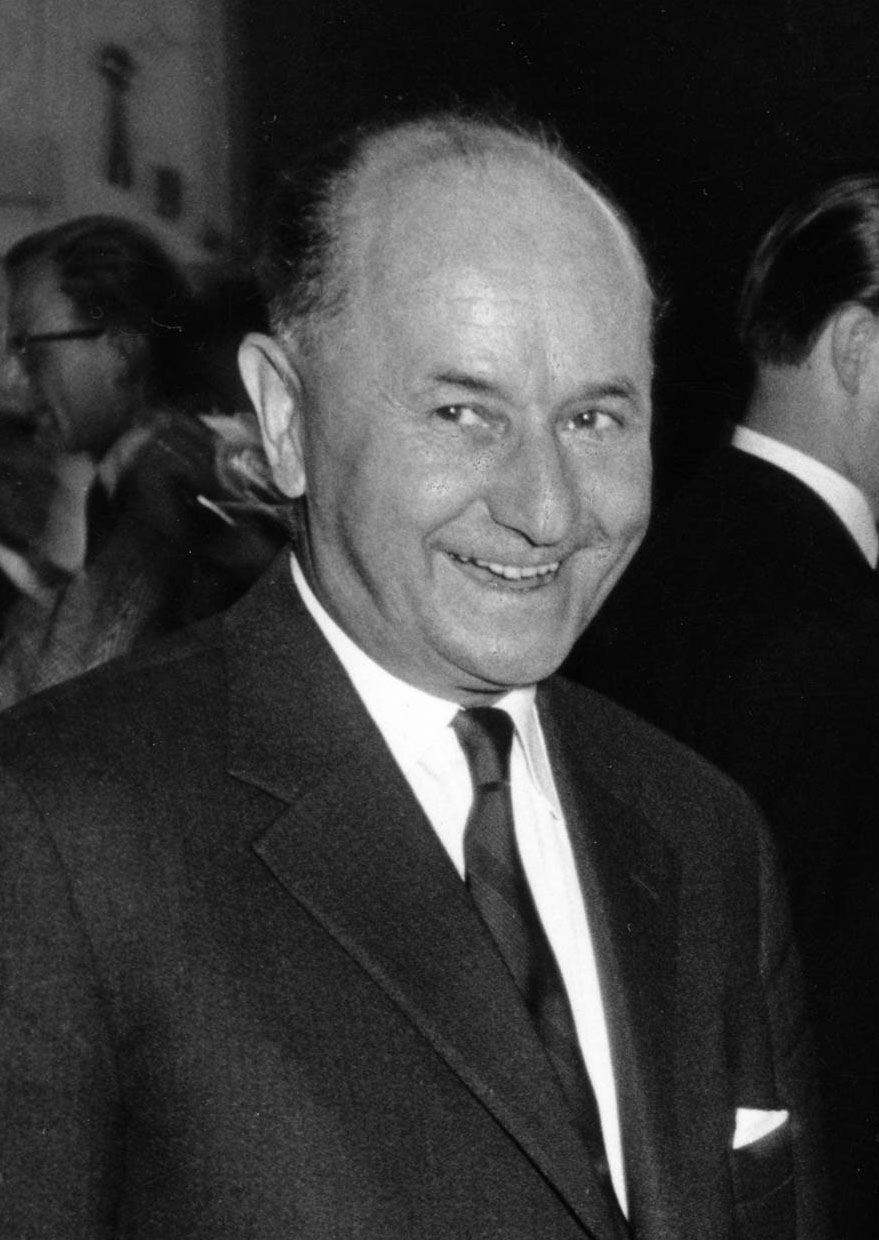
- Seidel in 1957

Minister President of Bavaria
- In office 16 October 1957 – 22 January 1960
- President: Theodor Heuss; Heinrich Lübke
- Chancellor: Konrad Adenauer
- Preceded by: Wilhelm Hoegner
- Succeeded by: Hans Ehard

Minister for Economy
- In office 1947–1954

Personal details
- Born: 12 October 1901 Schweinheim, Kingdom of Bavaria, German Empire
- Died: 5 August 1961 (aged 59) Munich, Bavaria, West Germany
- Party: CSU
- Occupation: Lawyer

Franz Wendelin "Hanns" Seidel (/ˈzaɪdəl/; German: [ˈzaɪdəl]; 12 October 1901 – 5 August 1961) was a German politician who served as Minister-President of Bavaria from 1957 to 1960. He was a member, and from 1955 to 1961 chairman, of the Christian Social Union of Bavaria (CSU).

== Biography ==
Seidel was born in Schweinheim, now part of Aschaffenburg, one of seven children; his parents were Johann and Christine Seidel. He was originally baptized under the name Franz Wendelin but was soon called simply Hanns. His father died when he was seven and the family had to live in relative poverty from then on. Despite those circumstances, he managed to obtain a good education.

Hanns Seidel studied law in Jena, Freiburg and Würzburg, where he graduated in 1929. He worked as a lawyer in Aschaffenburg after this and married Ilse Tenter, with whom he had two sons. As a strict Catholic, he joined the Bavarian People's Party in 1932. His outspokenness about the Nazis soon got him into trouble and he had to withdraw his candidacy for the Aschaffenburg town council. He briefly had to escape to Memel (now Klaipėda) in Eastern Prussia to avoid arrest but returned home soon after.

He was elected to the Landtag of Bavaria in 1946. Previous to this, the US occupation authorities had already made him Landrat for Aschaffenburg due to the fact that he had no previous political history in the Nazi regime. As a liberal-conservative he supported the multi-confessional fraction in his party. Seidel held neoliberal and ordoliberal views on the economy. His views influenced the position of the party on the way the economy should be run after World War II and the welfare-state that should be established.

Seidel eventually became Minister for Economy in 1947 and held this post until his party's election defeat in 1954. He was an important force in the reconstruction efforts in post-war Bavaria. He was also highly regarded by the German chancellor Konrad Adenauer who unsuccessfully tried to convince him to take up a post in the federal government. In 1954, he was made speaker for the opposition, the year after, he became party chairman of the CSU, defeating Franz Josef Strauß in a highly contested party vote. Under his leadership, Seidel modernized the party and its politics.

After Wilhelm Hoegner resigned as Minister-President of Bavaria, Hanns Seidel was elected by the Landtag as Minister-President on 16 October 1957. He had to resign from this post on 21 January 1960 for health reasons and died the year after, at the age of 59, in Munich.

== Hanns Seidel Foundation ==
The Hanns-Seidel-Stiftung abbreviated HSS and internationally known as the Hanns Seidel Foundation, formed in 1967. As a political research foundation funded from the federal budget, it is closely associated with the CSU and named after Hanns Seidel.

Political offices
Preceded by Wilhelm Hoegner	Prime Minister of Bavaria; 1957 – 1960	Succeeded by Hans Ehard
