= Christian Social Union in Bavaria =

Political party in Bavaria, Germany

Christian Social Union in Bavaria Christlich-Soziale Union in Bayern
- Abbreviation: CSU
- Leader: Markus Söder
- Secretary General: Martin Huber
- Founded: 13 October 1945; 81 years ago
- Preceded by: Bavarian People's Party (de facto)
- Headquarters: Munich, Bavaria, Germany
- Newspaper: Bayernkurier (1950–2019)
- Youth wing: Young Union
- Membership (2024): ▼125,300
- Ideology: Christian democracy; Conservatism (German); Regionalism
- Political position: Centre-right
- National affiliation: CDU/CSU (since 1949)
- Regional affiliation: German Social Union (1990–1993)
- European affiliation: European People's Party
- European Parliament group: European People's Party Group
- International affiliation: International Democracy Union
- Colours: Blue
- Bundestag Bavarian seats: 44 / 101
- Bundesrat Bavarian seats: 4 / 6
- Landtag of Bavaria: 85 / 205
- European Parliament: 6 / 96
- Heads of State Governments: 1 / 16

Party flag

Website
- csu.de

The Christian Social Union in Bavaria (German: Christlich-Soziale Union in Bayern, CSU) is a Christian democratic and conservative political party in Germany. Having a regionalist identity, the CSU operates only in Bavaria while its larger counterpart, the Christian Democratic Union (CDU), operates in the other 15 states of Germany. The CSU is considered more conservative than the CDU. Founded in 1945, the CSU is considered the de facto successor of the Weimar-era Catholic Bavarian People's Party.

At the federal level, the CSU forms a common faction in the Bundestag with the CDU which is frequently referred to as the Union Faction (die Unionsfraktion) or simply CDU/CSU. The CSU has had 44 seats in the Bundestag since the 2025 federal election, making it currently the sixth largest of the seven parties represented and the largest parliamentary faction as part of CDU/CSU with 208 seats. The CSU is a member of the European People's Party and the International Democracy Union.

Party leader Markus Söder serves as Minister-President of Bavaria, a position that CSU representatives have held from 1946 to 1954 and again since 1957. From 1962 to 2008 and from 2013 to 2018, the CSU had the absolute majority in the Bavarian Landtag.

== History ==
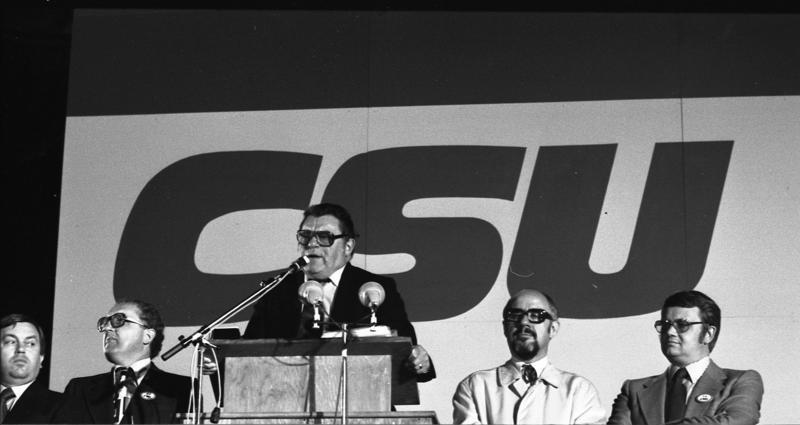
Chairman Franz Josef Strauß in 1976

The CSU has led the Bavarian state government since it came into existence in 1946, save from 1954 to 1957 when the SPD formed a state government in coalition with the Bavaria Party and the state branches of the GB/BHE and FDP.

Initially, the separatist Bavaria Party (BP) successfully competed for the same electorate as the CSU, as both parties saw and presented themselves as successors to the BVP. The CSU was ultimately able to win this power struggle for itself. Among other things, the BP was involved in the "casino affair" under dubious circumstances by the CSU at the end of the 1950s and lost considerable prestige and votes. In the 1966 state election, the BP finally left the state parliament.

Franz Josef Strauß (1915–1988) had left behind the strongest legacy as a leader of the party, having led the party from 1961 until his death in 1988. His political career in the federal cabinet was unique in that he had served in four ministerial posts in the years between 1953 and 1969. From 1978 until his death in 1988, Strauß served as the Minister-President of Bavaria. Strauß was the first leader of the CSU to be a candidate for the German chancellery in 1980. In the 1980 federal election, Strauß ran against the incumbent Helmut Schmidt of the Social Democratic Party of Germany (SPD) but lost thereafter as the SPD and the Free Democratic Party (FDP) managed to secure an absolute majority together, forming a social-liberal coalition.

Before the 2008 elections in Bavaria, the CSU perennially achieved absolute majorities at the state level by itself. This level of dominance is unique among Germany's 16 states. Edmund Stoiber took over the CSU leadership in 1999. He ran for Chancellor of Germany in 2002, but his preferred CDU/CSU–FDP coalition lost against the SPD candidate Gerhard Schröder's SPD–Green alliance.

In the 2003 Bavarian state election, the CSU won 60.7% of the vote and 124 of 180 seats in the state parliament. This was the first time any party had won a two-thirds majority in a German state parliament. The Economist later suggested that this exceptional result was due to a backlash against Schröder's government in Berlin. The CSU's popularity declined in subsequent years. Stoiber stepped down from the posts of Minister-President and CSU chairman in September 2007. A year later, the CSU lost its majority in the 2008 Bavarian state election, with its vote share dropping from 60.7% to 43.4%. The CSU remained in power by forming a coalition with the FDP. In the 2009 general election, the CSU received only 42.5% of the vote in Bavaria in the 2009 election, which by then constituted its weakest showing in the party's history.

The CSU made gains in the 2013 Bavarian state election and the 2013 federal election, which were held a week apart in September 2013. The CSU regained their majority in the Bavarian Landtag and remained in government in Berlin. They had three ministers in the Fourth Merkel cabinet, namely Horst Seehofer (Minister of the Interior, Building and Community), Andreas Scheuer (Minister of Transport and Digital Infrastructure) and Gerd Müller (Minister for Economic Cooperation and Development).

The 2018 Bavarian state election yielded the worst result for the CSU in the state elections (top candidate Markus Söder) since 1950 with 37.2% of votes, a decline of over ten percentage points compared to the last result in 2013. After that, the CSU had to form a new coalition government with the minor partner Free Voters of Bavaria.

The 2021 German federal election saw the worst election result ever for the Union. The CSU also had a weak showing with 5.2% of votes nationally and 31.7% of the total in Bavaria. In the 2023 Bavarian state election, the CSU remained on 85 seats (with 37.0% of the vote) and continued its coalition government with the Free Voters.

In the 2025 German federal election the CSU received 37.2% votes in Bavaria.

== Organisation ==
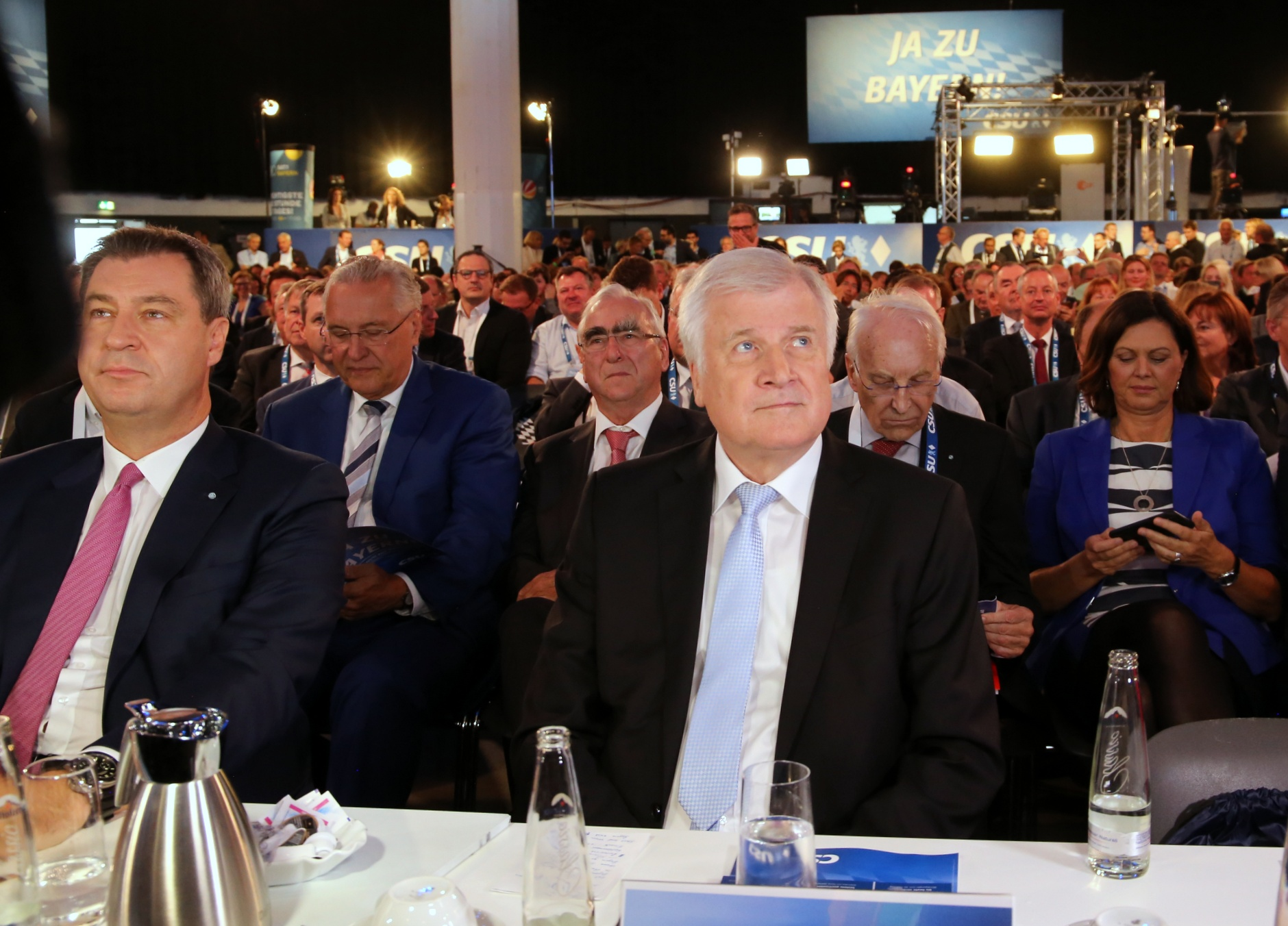
CSU meeting in 2018

The CSU is only organized in the Free State of Bavaria and only runs for election there. At the federal level, it forms a parliamentary group in the German Bundestag with its sister party, the CDU. The Hanns Seidel Foundation is close to the CSU.

=== Content Structure ===
Eight working groups, eleven working committees, eight commissions, and seven forums develop the substantive and strategic positions of CSU policy. Outside the party are the Union of Trainees and Students in Bavaria (SU Bayern) and the Association of Christian Democratic Students (RCDS), an association of university groups affiliated with the CDU/CSU.

=== Political Academy of the CSU ===
In addition to that, the CSU offers various programs, such as the Political Academy of the CSU. The prestigious two-year program provides different lectures, workshops and trainings for the participants. It is highly selective with only 30 members per year.

=== Praesidium ===
The handling of the day-to-day business and questions of economic activity of the party is the task of the party's praesidium, which, in addition to the party chairman and his deputies, the secretary general, the treasurers and secretaries, as well as the managing director and the chairman of the finance commission, have seven members elected by the board. The praesidium is considered the closest leadership circle of the CSU.

=== State leadership ===
The internal party administration and organisation is the responsibility of the so-called state leadership, which is based in the Franz-Josef-Strauß-Haus in Munich-Schwabing. It is led by the Secretary General (since 6 May 2022 Martin Huber) and the managing director (since March 2020 Tobias Schmid).

=== Regional organisation ===
Regionally, the CSU is subdivided into ten district associations, 105 county associations and almost 3,000 local associations.

== Ideology and platform ==
The CSU pledges to support small and medium enterprises, opposing tax increases on these companies. In the 2006 fiscal year, the CSU presented a budget for Bavaria that was the first state to have no new debt, achieved primarily through rigorous spending cuts by all ministries. The party also states that for a new regulation to be introduced, an old regulation must be eliminated.

The CSU differs from the CDU by being more conservative in social matters. For example, the party calls for harsher punishments for those who break the blasphemy law in Germany and is generally opposed to liberalising abortions. Because of its patriotic rhetoric, which emphasizes the "Heimat", and calls for restrictions on immigration and maintaining a "Leitkultur", the CSU has been accused of exhibiting right-wing populist tendencies and adopting rhetorical elements of the AfD.

The CSU relies on the three-tier school system and justifies it in the dispute over comprehensive schools with Bavaria's good results in the PISA study. The multi-tier school system in Bavaria is seen as flexible, since all Bavarian secondary schools enable their students to obtain an intermediate school certificate.

For a long time, the CSU supported the charging of tuition fees, but in October 2012 parts of the CSU, in particular CSU chairman Horst Seehofer, were already considering abolishing them. In April 2013, the Bavarian State Parliament decided to abolish tuition fees, with the support of some CSU members.

The CSU strongly opposes the introduction of a general speed limit on German motorways.

== Relationship with the CDU ==
The CSU is the sister party of the Christian Democratic Union (CDU). Together, they are called the Union. The CSU operates only within Bavaria, and the CDU operates in all states other than Bavaria. While virtually independent, at the federal level the parties form a common CDU/CSU faction. No Chancellor has ever come from the CSU, although Strauß and Edmund Stoiber were CDU/CSU candidates for Chancellor in the 1980 federal election and the 2002 federal election, respectively, which were both won by the Social Democratic Party of Germany (SPD). Below the federal level, the parties are entirely independent.

The CSU has been described as more conservative than the CDU. The CSU and the state of Bavaria decided not to sign the Grundgesetz of the Federal Republic of Germany as they could not agree with the division of Germany into two states after World War II. Although Bavaria like all German states has a separate police and justice system (distinctive and non-federal), the CSU has actively participated in all political affairs of the German Parliament, the German government, the German Bundesrat, the parliamentary elections of the German President, the European Parliament and meetings with Mikhail Gorbachev in Russia.

Like the CDU, the CSU is pro-European, although some Eurosceptic tendencies were shown in the past.

== Leaders ==
=== Party chairmen ===
Chairman		From	To
1st	Josef Müller	17 December 1945	28 May 1949
2nd	Hans Ehard	28 May 1949	22 January 1955
3rd	Hanns Seidel	22 January 1955	16 February 1961
4th	Franz Josef Strauss	18 March 1961	3 October 1988
5th	Theodor Waigel	16 November 1988	16 January 1999
6th	Edmund Stoiber	16 January 1999	29 September 2007
7th	Erwin Huber	29 September 2007	25 October 2008
8th	Horst Seehofer	25 October 2008	19 January 2019
9th	Markus Söder	19 January 2019	Present day

=== Ministers-president ===
The CSU has contributed eleven of the twelve Ministers-President of Bavaria since 1945, with only Wilhelm Hoegner (1945–1946, 1954–1957) of the SPD also holding the office.

Minister-President	From	To
Fritz Schäffer	28 May 1945	28 September 1945
Hans Ehard (first time)	21 December 1946	14 December 1954
Hanns Seidel	16 October 1957	22 January 1960
Hans Ehard (second time)	26 January 1960	11 December 1962
Alfons Goppel	11 December 1962	6 November 1978
Franz Josef Strauss	6 November 1978	3 October 1988
Max Streibl	19 October 1988	27 May 1993
Edmund Stoiber	28 May 1993	30 September 2007
Günther Beckstein	9 October 2007	27 October 2008
Horst Seehofer	27 October 2008	13 March 2018
Markus Söder	16 March 2018	Present day

=== Regional Leadership ===
District Association	Chairman
Lower Bavaria	Christian Bernreiter
Upper Bavaria	Ilse Aigner
Upper Palatinate	Albert Füracker
Lower Franconia	Steffen Vogel
Middle Franconia	Joachim Herrmann
Upper Franconia	Hans-Peter Friedrich
Swabia	Klaus Holetschek
Augsburg	Volker Ullrich
Munich	Georg Eisenreich
Nuremberg - Fürth - Schwabach	Michael Frieser

== Election results ==
=== Federal parliament (Bundestag) ===
Election	Constituency		Party list		Seats	+/–	Status
Election	Votes	%	Votes	%	Seats	+/–	Status
1949			1,380,448	5.8 (#4)	24 / 402		CDU/CSU–FDP–DP
1953	2,450,286	8.9 (#4)	2,427,387	8.8 (#4)	52 / 509	▲28	CDU/CSU–FDP–DP
1957	3,186,150	10.6 (#3)	3,133,060	10.5 (#3)	55 / 519	▲3	CDU/CSU
1961	3,104,742	9.7 (#4)	3,014,471	9.6 (#4)	50 / 521	▼5	CDU/CSU–FDP
1965	3,204,648	9.9 (#3)	3,136,506	9.6 (#3)	49 / 518	▲1	CDU/CSU–SPD
1969	3,094,176	9.5 (#3)	3,115,652	9.5 (#3)	49 / 518	Steady	Opposition
1972	3,620,625	9.7 (#3)	3,615,183	9.7 (#3)	48 / 518	▼1	Opposition
1976	4,008,514	10.6 (#3)	4,027,499	10.6 (#3)	53 / 518	▲5	Opposition
1980	3,941,365	10.4 (#3)	3,908,459	10.3 (#4)	52 / 519	▼1	Opposition (1980–82)
1980	3,941,365	10.4 (#3)	3,908,459	10.3 (#4)	52 / 519	▼1	CDU/CSU–FDP (1982–83)
1983	4,318,800	11.1 (#3)	4,140,865	10.6 (#3)	53 / 520	▲1	CDU/CSU–FDP
1987	3,859,244	10.2 (#3)	3,715,827	9.8 (#3)	49 / 519	▼4	CDU/CSU–FDP
1990	3,423,904	7.4 (#4)	3,302,980	7.1 (#4)	51 / 662	▲2	CDU/CSU–FDP
1994	3,657,627	6.5 (#3)	3,427,196	7.3 (#3)	50 / 672	▼1	CDU/CSU–FDP
1998	3,602,472	7.3 (#3)	3,324,480	6.8 (#3)	47 / 669	▼3	Opposition
2002	4,311,178	9.0 (#3)	4,315,080	9.0 (#3)	58 / 603	▲11	Opposition
2005	3,889,990	8.2 (#3)	3,494,309	7.4 (#6)	46 / 614	▼12	CDU/CSU–SPD
2009	3,191,000	7.4 (#6)	2,830,238	6.5 (#6)	45 / 622	▼1	CDU/CSU–FDP
2013	3,544,079	8.1 (#4)	3,243,569	7.4 (#5)	56 / 631	▲11	CDU/CSU–SPD
2017	3,255,604	7.0 (#6)	2,869,744	6.2 (#7)	46 / 709	▼10	CDU/CSU–SPD
2021	2,787,904	6.0 (#6)	2,402,826	5.2 (#6)	45 / 735	▼1	Opposition
2025	3,271,730	6.6 (#6)	2,963,732	6.0 (#6)	44 / 630	▼1	CDU/CSU–SPD

=== European Parliament ===
Election	Votes	%	Seats	+/–
1979	2,817,120	10.1 (#3)	8 / 81	
1984	2,109,130	8.5 (#3)	7 / 81	▼1
1989	2,326,277	8.2 (#4)	7 / 81	Steady
1994	2,393,374	6.8 (#4)	8 / 99	▲1
1999	2,540,007	9.4 (#4)	10 / 99	▲2
2004	2,063,900	8.0 (#4)	9 / 99	▼1
2009	1,896,762	7.2 (#6)	8 / 99	▼1
2014	1,567,258	5.3 (#6)	5 / 96	▼3
2019	2,354,816	6.3 (#5)	6 / 96	▲1
2024	2,513,300	6.3 (#5)	6 / 96	Steady

=== Landtag of Bavaria ===
Election	Constituency		Party list		Seats	+/–	Status
Election	Votes	%	Votes	%	Seats	+/–	Status
1946			1,593,908	52.2 (#1)	104 / 180		CSU–SPD
1950	1,264,993	26.8 (#1)	1,262,377	27.4 (#1)	64 / 204	▼40	CSU–SPD
1954	1,855,995	37.6 (#1)	1,835,959	37.9 (#1)	83 / 204	▲19	Opposition
1958	2,101,645	44.8 (#1)	2,091,259	45.5 (#1)	101 / 204	▲18	CSU–FDP–BHE
1962	2,343,169	47.1 (#1)	2,320,359	47.5 (#1)	108 / 204	▲7	CSU–BP
1966	2,549,610	47.7 (#1)	2,524,732	48.1 (#1)	110 / 204	▲2	CSU majority
1970	3,205,170	56.2 (#1)	3,139,429	56.4 (#1)	124 / 204	▲14	CSU majority
1974	3,520,065	61.7 (#1)	3,481,486	62.0 (#1)	132 / 204	▲8	CSU majority
1978	3,394,096	58.5 (#1)	3,387,995	59.1 (#1)	129 / 204	▼3	CSU majority
1982	3,557,068	57.9 (#1)	3,534,375	58.2 (#1)	133 / 204	▲4	CSU majority
1986	3,142,094	54.9 (#1)	3,191,640	55.7 (#1)	128 / 204	▼5	CSU majority
1990	3,007,566	52.6 (#1)	3,085,948	54.9 (#1)	127 / 204	▼1	CSU majority
1994	3,063,635	52.2 (#1)	3,100,253	52.8 (#1)	120 / 204	▼7	CSU majority
1998	3,168,996	51.7 (#1)	3,278,768	52.9 (#1)	123 / 204	▲3	CSU majority
2003	3,050,456	59.3 (#1)	3,167,408	60.6 (#1)	124 / 180	▲1	CSU majority
2008	2,267,521	42.5 (#1)	2,336,439	43.4 (#1)	92 / 187	▼32	CSU–FDP
2013	2,754,256	46.5 (#1)	2,882,169	47.7 (#1)	101 / 180	▲9	CSU majority
2018	2,495,186	36.7 (#1)	2,551,046	37.2 (#1)	85 / 205	▼16	CSU–FW
2023	2,527,580	37.0 (#1)	2,531,562	37.1 (#1)	85 / 203	Steady	CSU-FW

== See also ==
- List of Christian Social Union of Bavaria politicians
- Politics of Bavaria
