= Hans Ehard =

German politician (1887–1980)

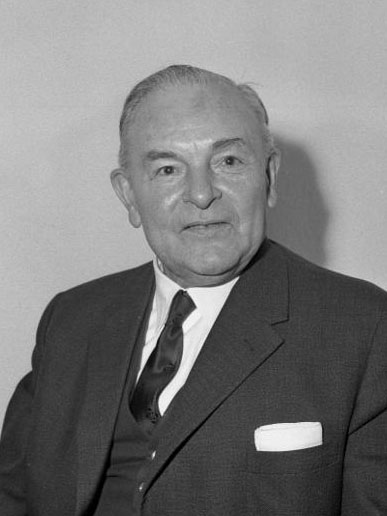
- Hans Ehard (1961)

Minister President of Bavaria
- In office 21 December 1946 – 14 December 1954
- President: Theodor Heuss
- Chancellor: Konrad Adenauer
- Preceded by: Wilhelm Hoegner
- Succeeded by: Wilhelm Hoegner
- In office 26 January 1960 – 11 December 1962
- President: Theodor Heuss; Heinrich Lübke
- Chancellor: Konrad Adenauer
- Preceded by: Hanns Seidel
- Succeeded by: Alfons Goppel

Minister of Justice of Bavaria
- In office 11 December 1962 – 5 December 1966
- Preceded by: Albrecht Haas
- Succeeded by: Philip Held
- In office 28 May 1945 – 18 October 1945
- Succeeded by: Wilhelm Hoegner

President of the German Bundesrat
- In office 8 September 1950 – 7 September 1951
- Preceded by: Karl Arnold
- Succeeded by: Hinrich Wilhelm Kopf
- In office 8 September 1961 – 7 September 1962
- Preceded by: Franz Meyers
- Succeeded by: Kurt Georg Kiesinger

Personal details
- Born: 10 November 1887 Bamberg, Bavaria, German Empire
- Died: 18 October 1980 (aged 92) Munich, Bavaria, West Germany
- Party: CSU
- Spouses: Annelore Max (m. 1916; died 1957) Sieglinde Odörfer (m. 1960)

Hans Ehard (10 November 1887 – 18 October 1980) was a German lawyer and politician, a member of the Christian Social Union (CSU) party.

== Biography ==
Hans Ehard was born in Bamberg in 1887, the son of a local official, August Ehard. He was married in 1916 to Annelore Maex. After his wife died in 1957, he married Sieglinde Odörfer in 1960.

After studying jurisprudence in Munich and Würzburg, Ehard became public prosecutor in the Bavarian Ministry of Justice in 1919. In this office, he was the main prosecutor of Hitler and Ludendorff in 1924, after their failed attempt to overthrow the Bavarian government in 1923. In 1933 he became President of the high court in Munich, a position he held until the end of the war. He sympathised with the Bavarian People's Party but was not politically active in those years.

After the war, in 1945, he briefly served under Schäffer as Minister of Justice, later serving in Hoegner's first cabinet as undersecretary of state in the Ministry of Justice. He was a member of the constituent assembly, and was elected Minister President on 21 December 1946 with a coalition of CSU, SPD and the Economic Structure Combination (Wirtschaftliche Aufbau-Vereinigung). He became the first freely elected Bavarian minister-president since 1933. He was a member of the Bavarian Landtag from 1946 to 1966.

When the SPD withdrew its Ministers from the coalition, he was able to form a CSU-only government on 21 September 1947. During the formation years of the Federal Republic of Germany, he advocated a strongly federalist concept for the new country, in opposition to most of the SPD-ruled states, who wanted a strong central government. He also argued for a form of European federation. From 1949 to 1955 he was also chairman of the CSU. From 1954 to 1957, his party was in opposition to the SPD-lead coalition government. As of 2021, these three years were the CSU's only period outside of government. Ehard held in those years the position of President of the Landtag, from 1954 to 1960.

From 26 January 1960 to 11 December 1962, he again served as Minister President, stepping down to become Justice Minister, in which capacity he served until 5 December 1966

Ehard had been President of the Schutzgemeinschaft Deutscher Wald (SDW), an environmental charity, as well as of the Bavarian Red Cross. In 1957 he was made an honorary citizen of city of Munich, the British equivalent being Freedom of the City.

Hans Ehard was the [oldest former minister-president of Germany from 9 June 1980 to November 1985, preceded by Wilhelm Kaisen and succeeded by Max Seydewitz. Counting only the minister-presidents of the FRG he was succeeded by Bruno Diekmann on 27 March 1990. He died in Munich.

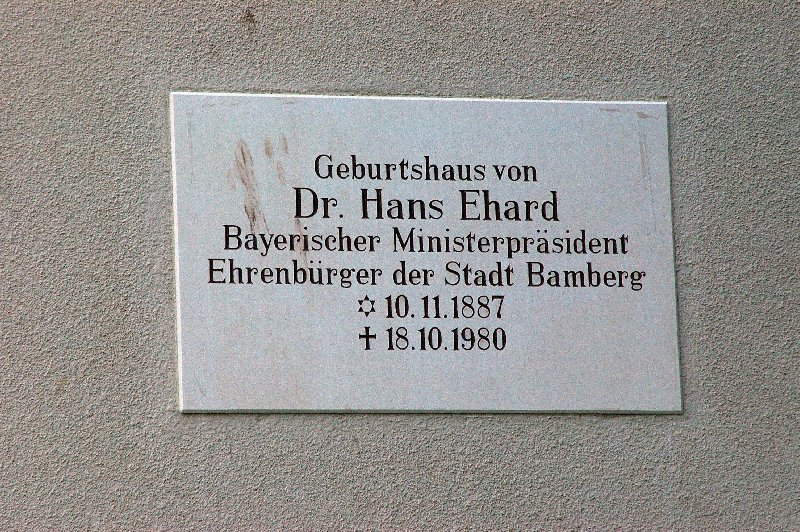
Plaque marking the house where Ehard was born.

== Post-War career ==
- 1945 Bavarian Minister of Justice
- 1946–1954 Bavarian Minister-President
- 1949–1955 Chairman of the CSU
- 1950–1951 President of the Bundesrat
- 1951–1952 Bavarian transport minister
- 1954–1960 President of the Bavarian Landtag
- 1960–1962 Bavarian Minister-President
- 1961–1962 President of the State Senate
- 1962–1966 Bavarian Minister of Justice

== Honours and awards ==
- Grand Cross of the Order of Merit of the Federal Republic of Germany (1953)
- Grand Cross of the Order of Merit of the Italian Republic (1956)
- Grand Decoration of Honour in Silver with Sash of the Decoration of Honour for Services to the Republic of Austria (1957)
- Knight Grand Cross of the Order of St. Gregory the Great (1961)
- Grand Officer of the Legion of Honour (France, 1962)
- Honorary Member of the Academy of Fine Arts, Nuremberg (1962)
- Bayerische Verfassungsmedaille (Bavarian Constitution Medal) in Gold

== See also ==
- List of minister-presidents of Bavaria

Political offices
Preceded by Alois Hundhammer	Presidents of the Landtag of Bavaria; 1954–1960	Succeeded by Rudolf Hanauer
