= Minister of Foreign Affairs (Bavaria) =

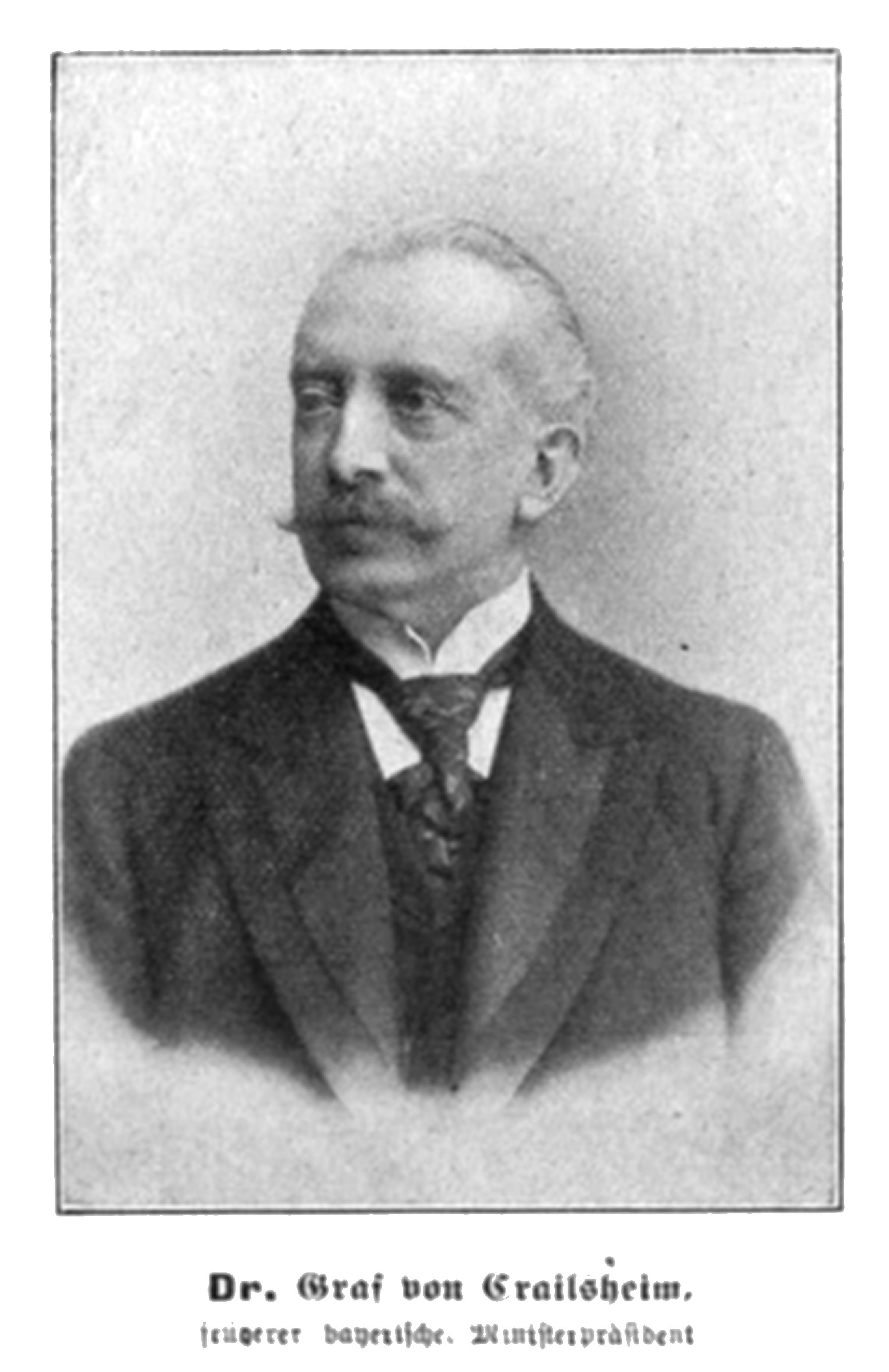
Friedrich Krafft Graf von Crailsheim, longest-serving Minister of Foreign Affairs of Bavaria, in office from 1880 to 1903.

This is a list of foreign ministers of Bavaria.

| Portrait | Name (Birth–Death) | Term of Office | | | Note |
| Portrait | Name (Birth–Death) | Took office | Left office | Time in office | Note |
|---|---|---|---|---|---|
| 1 | Maximilian Franz Joseph von Berchem (1702–1777) | 1745 | 18 November 1777 | c. 32 years | |
| 2 | Matthäus von Vieregg (1719–1802) | 18 November 1777 | 21 February 1799 | 21 years, 95 days | |
| 3 | Maximilian Graf von Montgelas (1759–1838) | 21 February 1799 | 2 February 1817 | 17 years, 347 days | |
| 4 | Heinrich Alois von Reigersberg (1770–1865) | 2 February 1817 | 1823 | c. 5 years | |
| 5 | Aloys Graf von Rechberg und Rothenlöwen (1766–1849) | 2 February 1817 | 13 October 1825 | 8 years, 253 days | |
| 6 | Friedrich Karl von Thürheim (1763–1832) | 1 January 1827 | 28 April 1827 | 117 days | |
| 7 | Georg Friedrich von Zentner (1752–1835) | 28 April 1827 | 1 September 1828 | 1 year, 132 days | |
| 8 | Josef Ludwig von Armansperg (1787–1853) | 1 September 1828 | 31 December 1831 | 3 years, 121 days | |
| 9 | Friedrich August von Gise (1783–1860) | 2 January 1832 | 26 May 1846 | 14 years, 144 days | |
| 10 | Count; Otto von Bray-Steinburg (1807–1899) | 26 May 1846 | 13 February 1847 | 263 days | |
| 11 | Georg Ludwig von Maurer (1790–1872) | 1 March 1847 | 29 November 1847 | 273 days | |
| 12 | Ludwig von Oettingen-Wallerstein (1791–1870) | 1 December 1847 | 12 March 1848 | 102 days | |
| 13 | Klemens August Graf von Waldkirch (1806–1858) | 14 March 1848 | 29 April 1848 | 46 days | |
| 14 | Count; Otto von Bray-Steinburg (1807–1899) | 29 April 1848 | 18 April 1849 | 354 days | |
| 15 | Baron; Ludwig von der Pfordten (1811–1880) | 22 December 1849 | 1 May 1859 | 9 years, 130 days | Also Chairman of the Council of Ministers |
| 16 | Karl von Schrenck von Notzing (1806–1884) | 1 May 1859 | 4 October 1864 | 5 years, 156 days | Also Chairman of the Council of Ministers |
| 17 | Max von Neumayr (1808–1881) | 4 October 1864 | 4 December 1864 | 61 days | Also Chairman of the Council of Ministers |
| 18 | Baron; Ludwig von der Pfordten (1811–1880) | 4 December 1864 | 29 December 1866 | 2 years, 25 days | Also Chairman of the Council of Ministers |
| 19 | Chlodwig zu Hohenlohe-Schillingsfürst (1819–1901) | 31 December 1866 | 7 March 1870 | 3 years, 66 days | Also Chairman of the Council of Ministers |
| 20 | Count; Otto von Bray-Steinburg (1807–1899) | 8 March 1870 | 25 June 1871 | 1 year, 109 days | Also Chairman of the Council of Ministers |
| 21 | Friedrich von Hegnenberg-Dux (1810–1872) | 21 August 1871 | 2 June 1872 | 286 days | Also Chairman of the Council of Ministers |
| 22 | Adolph von Pfretzschner (1820–1901) | 1 October 1872 | 4 March 1880 | 7 years, 155 days | Also Chairman of the Council of Ministers |
| 23 | Friedrich Krafft Graf von Crailsheim (1841–1926) | 4 March 1880 | 1 March 1903 | 22 years, 362 days | Also Chairman of the Council of Ministers |
| 24 | Clemens von Podewils-Dürniz (1850–1922) | 1 March 1903 | 9 February 1912 | 8 years, 345 days | Also Chairman of the Council of Ministers |
| 25 | Georg von Hertling (1843–1919) | 9 February 1912 | 10 November 1917 | 5 years, 274 days | Centre Party; Also Chairman of the Council of Ministers |
| 26 | Otto Ritter von Dandl (1868–1942) | 11 November 1917 | 7 November 1918 | 361 days | Also Chairman of the Council of Ministers |
| 27 | Kurt Eisner (1867–1919) | 8 November 1918 | 21 February 1919 | 105 days | Independent Social Democratic Party; Also Minister-President of Bavaria |
| 28 | Johannes Hoffmann (1867–1930) | 18 March 1919 | 13 March 1920 | 361 days | Social Democratic Party; Also Chairman of the Council of Ministers |
| 29 | Gustav von Kahr (1862–1934) | 16 March 1920 | 11 September 1921 | 1 year, 179 days | Bavarian People's Party; Also Chairman of the Council of Ministers |
| 30 | Hugo Graf von Lerchenfeld-Köfering (1871–1944) | 21 September 1921 | 2 November 1922 | 1 year, 42 days | Bavarian People's Party; Also Minister-President of Bavaria |
| 31 | Eugen von Knilling (1856–1927) | 8 November 1922 | 5 May 1924 | 1 year, 179 days | Bavarian People's Party; Also Chairman of the Council of Ministers |
| 32 | Heinrich Held (1868–1938) | 28 June 1924 | 15 March 1933 | 8 years, 260 days | Bavarian People's Party; Also Chairman of the Council of Ministers |
| 33 | Franz Ritter von Epp (1868–1947) | 16 March 1933 | 12 April 1933 | 27 days | Nazi Party; Also Reichsstatthalter |

== Sources ==
- Rulers.org – Foreign ministers E–K
