= Friedrich Krafft Graf von Crailsheim =

Bavarian politician

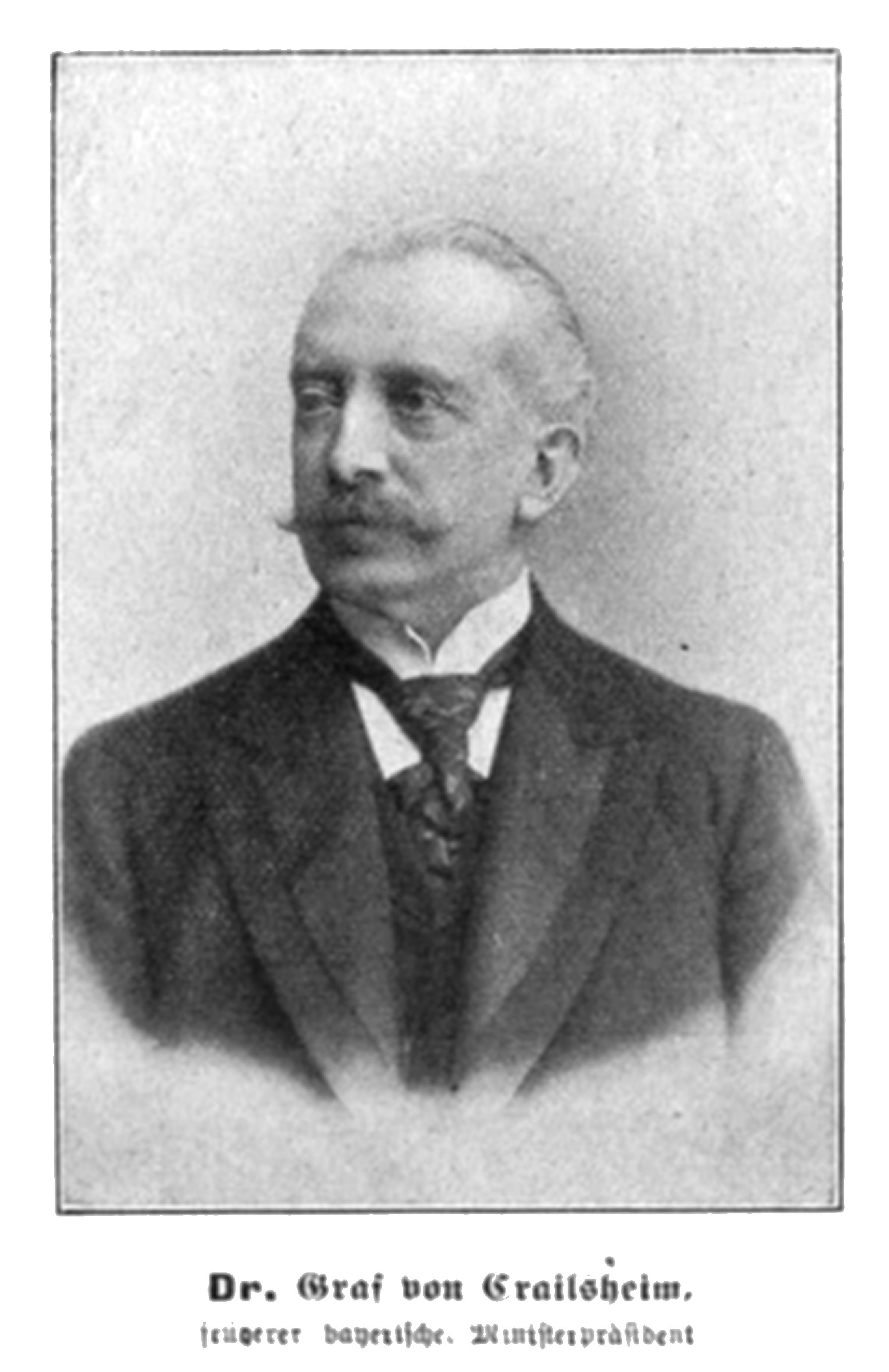
Friedrich Krafft von Crailsheim

Friedrich Krafft Graf von Crailsheim (15 March 1841, in Ansbach – 13 February 1926 in Munich, Bavaria) was a Bavarian politician who was the Foreign Minister of Bavaria from 1880 to 1903 and Prime Minister of the Kingdom from 1890 to 1903. In 1880-1890 he was the only Foreign Minister not to be the Prime Minister in Bavaria.

== Youth ==
Friedrich Krafft Graf von Crailsheim was already as a schoolboy an elitist and became a jurisprudent. In 1870 he entered the service of the Ministry of Commerce in Munich. He belonged to a Protestant family. He qualified as a lawyer after studying at the universities of Erlangen, Leipzig and Zurich.

== Career ==
Since January 1, 1872, he served in the Ministry of the Royal House and the Exterior and soon made a career. In 1874 he became legation councilor and in 1879 secret legation councilor. In 1880 Krafft von Crailsheim became Bavarian Foreign Minister for a liberal party. In 1890 he succeeded the deceased Johann von Lutz as chairman of the Council of Ministers (Ministerpräsident). He held this office until 1903. In 1895 he became a Reichsrat in the First Chamber of the Bavarian Parliament. With Lutz he played a decisive role in the deposition of King Ludwig II, which had brought him a brief detention.

His relations with the Bavarian court were very good, and loyal. In 1900 he acted the civil wedding of Princess Elisabeth in Bavaria with Prince Albert of Belgium in the Throne Hall. He became a close adviser to Prince Luitpold. In his resignation speech he recalled two main themes of his career, the confessional problems and the relationship of Bavaria to the German Empire.

== Honours ==
- 1894: Grand Cordon in the Order of Leopold.
- 1896: Knight of the Order of the Black Eagle.

Political offices
Preceded by Johann von Lutz	Minister-President of Bavaria; 1890 – 1903	Succeeded by Clemens von Podewils-Dürniz
