= Adolph von Pfretzschner =

Bavarian politician

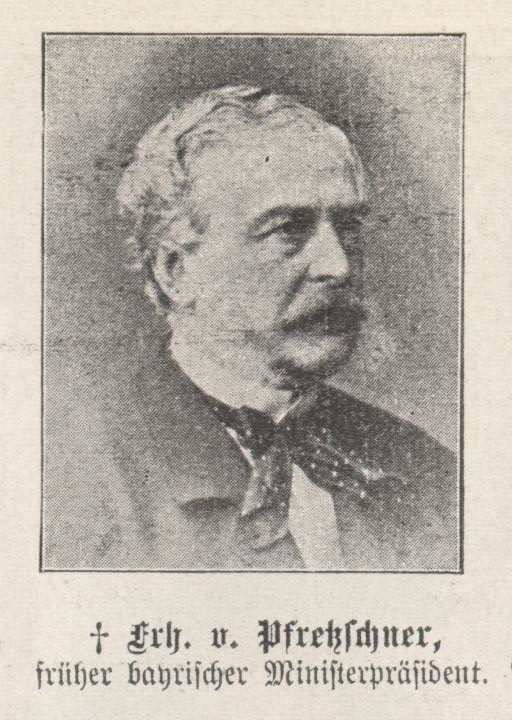
- Portrait, 1895

Minister-President of Bavaria
- In office 1 October 1872 – 4 March 1880
- Monarch: Ludwig II
- Preceded by: Friedrich von Hegnenberg-Dux
- Succeeded by: Johann von Lutz

Personal details
- Born: 15 August 1820
- Died: 27 April 1901 (aged 80)
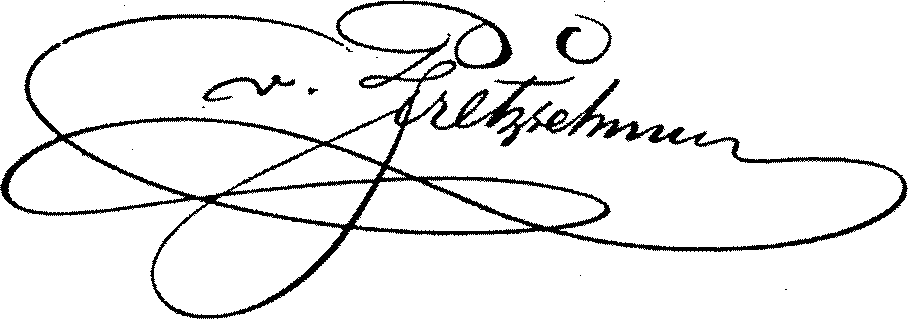
- Signature

Adolf Freiherr von Pfretzschner (15 August 1820 – 27 April 1901) was a Bavarian politician.

Pfretzschner studied law at the Ludwig-Maximilians-Universität München and was subsequently employed at the administrations of Upper Bavaria and Middle Franconia. In 1849, he joined the Bavarian ministry of Finance. In 1865, he was appointed Bavarian Minister of State for Commerce and Public Works, in 1866 in addition for Finance. In 1872 followed his appointment for Minister of State of the Royal House and Foreign Affairs and President of the Council of Ministers by King Ludwig II. In 1873, he was created a lifelong member of the Upper House of the Bavarian parliament. In 1880, Bismarck enforced Pfretzschner's resignation as Pfretzschner was seen as a modest liberal. The day following his resignation, he was elevated to barons' rank.

== See also ==
- History of Bavaria
- List of minister-presidents of Bavaria

Preceded by Friedrich von Hegnenberg-Dux	Prime Minister of Bavaria; 1872 – 1880	Succeeded by Johann von Lutz
