= Josephine von Wrbna-Kaunitz =

German asset manager

Josephine Reichsgräfin von Wrbna-Kaunitz (née Kellnberger; March 19, 1896, in Munich – December 13, 1973, there) was a German asset manager. Against the background of her illegal financial transactions and the corresponding criminal proceedings against her, she became known in the media as the Sperrmark Countess.

== Life ==
Josephine Kellnberger was the daughter of a master stove fitter. In her first marriage she was married to the x-ray specialist Josef Kassenetter.

Since the 1920s, Josephine Kassenetter was the asset manager of the Albertine line of the Wittelsbach family, specifically for its head, Prince Adalbert of Bavaria. During the time of National Socialism, she was arrested as a representative of the Wittelsbachers who were not loyal to the regime, but was released after a hunger strike. As asset manager she became the general representative in financial affairs for many members of the dynasty.

After her husband's death in 1943, she married in September 1944 Alfons Rudolf Ludwig Graf von Wrbna-Kaunitz-Rietberg-Questenberg und Freudenthal, a big Bohemian landowner of the same age.

After the Second World War, Josephine von Wrbna-Kaunitz continued to work for the Wittelsbach family in order to rebuild their property holdings. She relied on the development of Wittelsbacher Land, which she financed with Swiss blocked-mark (Sperrmark) loans. The latter constituted a violation of the applicable foreign exchange regulations in Germany. On the occasion of the sale of the Palais Leuchtenberg, which the neighbouring Bavarian tax office also wanted to buy as its main building, officials began investigations against Wrbna-Kaunitz in December 1952, since she purchased the Palais Leuchtenberg in cash. The Palais Leuchtenberg was auctioned off by Gustl Lenz, who was over the years at times a beneficiary of Wrbna-Kaunitz's connections and finances, as settlement for an alleged debt.

Wrbna-Kaunitz was initially on trial for foreign exchange offenses and tax evasion. Her previous clients distanced themselves from her and relieved her of all representative offices and powers; there was also the charge of forgery of documents. On this basis, Wrbna-Kaunitz was sentenced in 1956 to a fine and two years in prison for forging documents and foreign exchange offenses. The court determined that she had transferred 17.9 million blocked marks via the Kreissparkasse Munich; this is said to have brought her a profit of DM 5.2 million.

Wrbna-Kaunitz fled to St. Gallen in Switzerland in 1958 before starting her sentence. From there she litigated to clear her name. This included litigation against the Wittelsbach princes, who in turn saw their reputation ruined by her actions. Years of legal disputes followed, also following the announcement of her memoirs. In 1960, she achieved that the Munich fiscal court overturned tax demands against her worth millions resulting in a back payment of only 60.60 DM. When she returned to Munich in 1963, her sentence was waived because of her old age. In 1965 she published "Das große Spiel. Das Leuchtenbergpalais und der Bayerische Staat" which was marketed as settling the score.

She died, seriously ill for years, in an apartment fire caused by a defective lamp. A day later, her husband died of smoke inhalation.

Wrbna-Kaunitz also appears in theories as to the violent death of King Ludwig II of Bavaria. There are two accounts that at social meetings with Wrbna-Kaunitz, clothing of the king was shown which had bullet holes. However, the accounts contradict each other. One states that a waistcoat showed holes, but a jacket and coat were undamaged. The other account is about a grey wollen coat with two bullet holes.
