= Johann von Lutz =

Bavarian politician

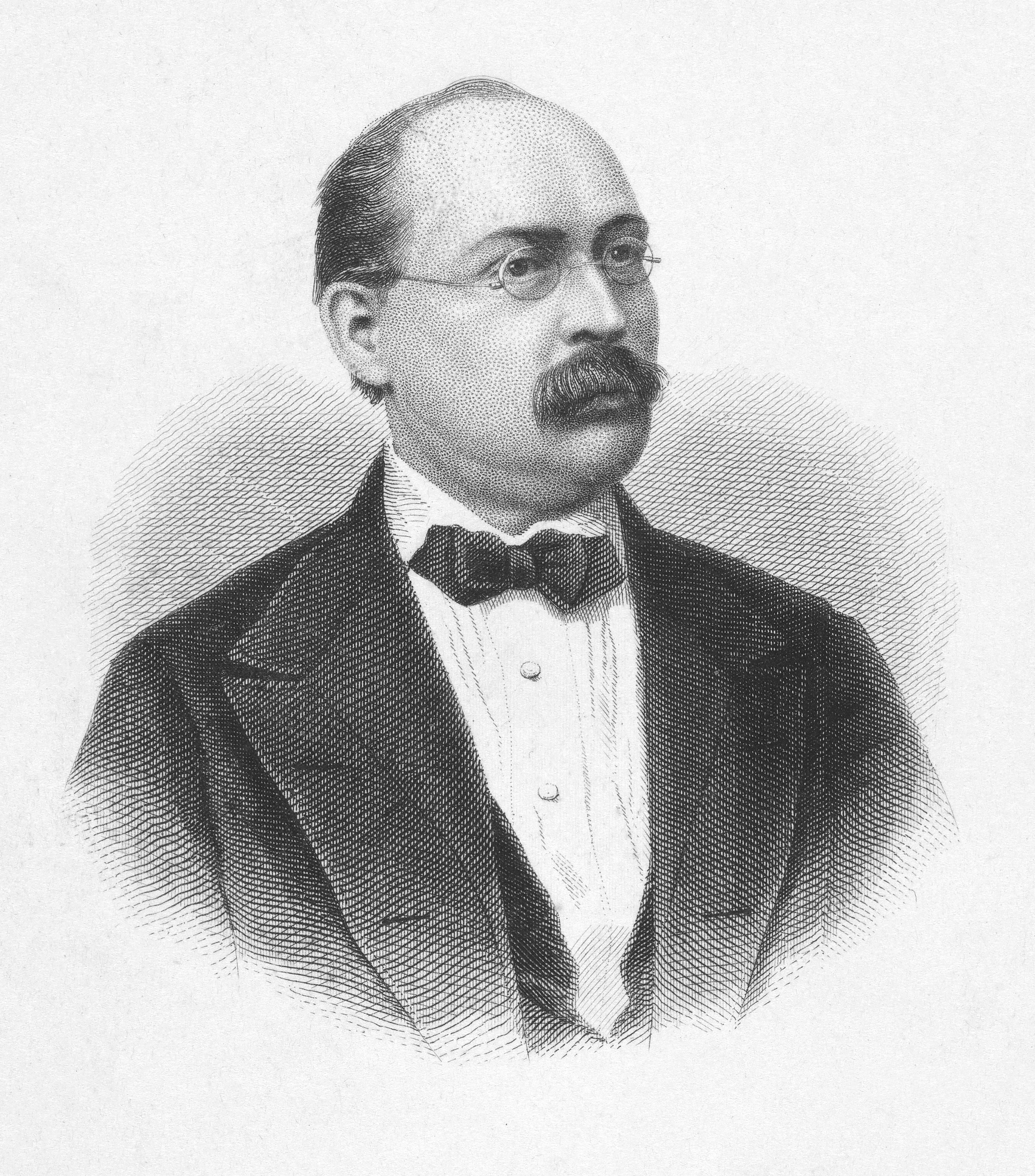
A depiction of Johann von Lutz

Johann von Lutz (4 December 1826, in Münnerstadt – 3 September 1890 in Niederpöcking, Bavaria) was a Bavarian politician.

== Biography ==
His parents were the teacher Josef Lutz (1801–1879) and his wife Magdalena Schedel (1809–1862), a daughter of the rural doctor Karl Schedel from Hammelburg. His younger brother Meyer Lutz (1829–1903) was composer and conductor. John Lutz studied law from 1843 to 1848 at the University of Würzburg. He participated in the drafting of the General German Commercial Code as a Bavarian delegate.

In 1867, he was Bavarian Justice Minister, 1869 Minister of Culture and as such involved in the Bavarian Kulturkampf to enforce the supremacy of the state over the church. After the resignation of the Council of Ministers Chairman Pfretzschner, which had been enforced by the German chancellor Otto von Bismarck, Lutz took over this position he retained until his death. His successor as prime minister was Friedrich Krafft von Crailsheim.

Lutz was a key figure in the overthrow of King Ludwig II. In March 1886, he commissioned Bernhard von Gudden, a specialist in brain anatomy, to issue an opinion on the King's mental state.

Lutz was in 1866 ennobled personally, he was awarded the hereditary peerage in 1880, he was raised to baronship in 1884.

Political offices
| Preceded by Adolph von Pfretzschner | Minister-President of Bavaria; 1880 – 1890 | Succeeded by Friedrich Krafft Graf von Crailsheim |
