= Friedrich von Hegnenberg-Dux =

Bavarian landowner and politician

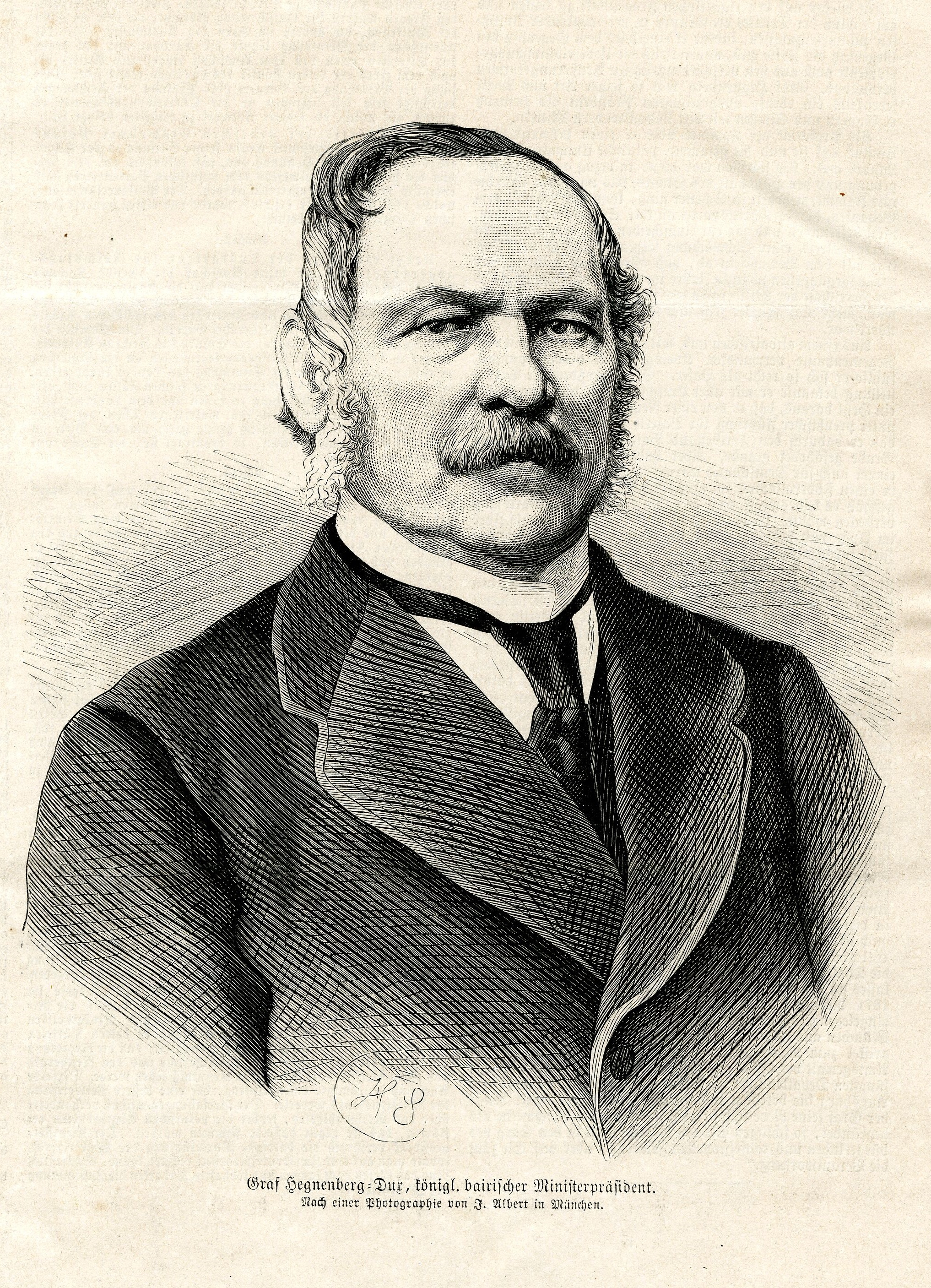
Friedrich von Hegnenberg-Dux

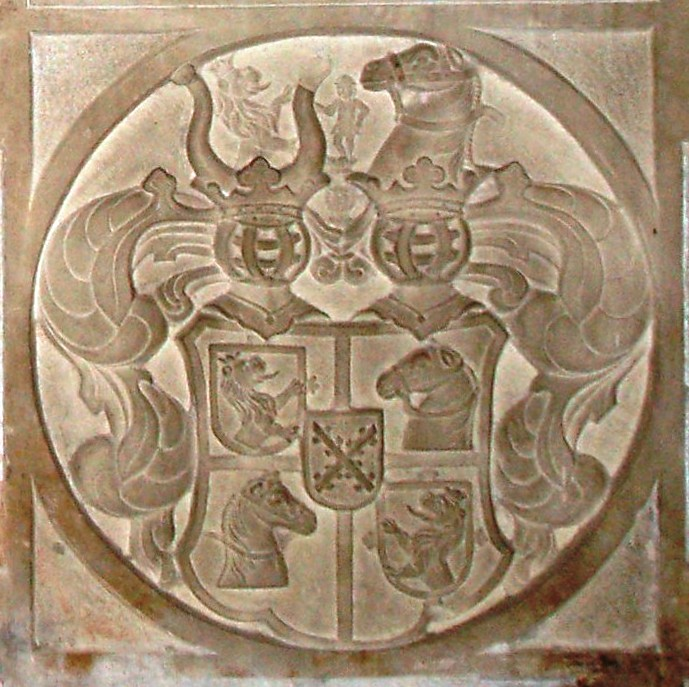
Family coat of arms

Friedrich Adam Johann Justus Graf von Hegnenberg-Dux (September 2, 1810, in Hof Hegnenberg near Fürstenfeldbruck – June 2, 1872, in Munich) was a Bavarian landowner and politician from the Bavarian nobility. Among other things, he was Foreign Minister and Chairman of the Council of Ministers of the Kingdom of Bavaria.

== Origin ==
Friedrich von Hegnenberg-Dux, who came from an illegitimate line of the Bavarian ruling family (Georg von Hegnenberg, called Dux [=Duke], c. 1509–1589, was an illegitimate son of Duke Wilhelm IV of Bavaria and Margarete Hausner von Stettberg), studied law and medicine at the University of Würzburg. After the death of his father Georg Maximilian Joseph von Hegnenberg-Dux (1775–1835), he took over the Hofmark Hegnenberg and the associated businesses in 1835. His mother was Maria Anna, née von Seinsheim (1774–1848).

In 1869, von Hegnenberg-Dux was one of the founders of the Bayerische Vereinsbank. From 1869 to 1871 it was led by the board of directors from the founders' circle. During this time he served as chairman of the board of directors.

== Political activities ==
As a member of the liberal party, he was elected to the Chamber of Deputies of the Landtag of Bavaria in 1845 as a representative of the noble landowners and held the position of second president of the chamber from 1847. After an interlude as a member of the Frankfurt Pre-Parliament and National Assembly, he remained first president of the Second Chamber until his resignation on March 27, 1865.

Along with Gustav Freiherr von Lerchenfeld, he was one of the liberal leaders of the state parliament who contributed significantly to the fall of the Pfordten/Reigersberg ministry in 1859.

Already retired, on August 21, 1871, after the resignation of Otto von Bray-Steinburg, he was appointed Minister of State for Foreign Affairs and Chairman of the Council of Ministers by King Ludwig II as a man of balance. The Kingdom of Bavaria had recently joined the new German Empire.

The historian Doeberl described him as "one of the finest political minds that Bavaria has possessed in the last century, with calm objectivity and clear thought, rich in sarcasm and apt wit". He died on June 2, 1872, after less than a year in office. Adolph von Pfretzschner became the new chairman of the Council of Ministers and Foreign Minister.

== Family ==
Hegnenberg-Dux had been married to Josephine von Gebsattel (1812–1866) since 1857; The marriage resulted in two children:

- Lothar von Hegnenberg-Dux (1847–1902)
- Maria Amalie von Hegnenberg-Dux (1853–1940)
