= Clemens von Podewils-Dürniz =

Bavarian politician

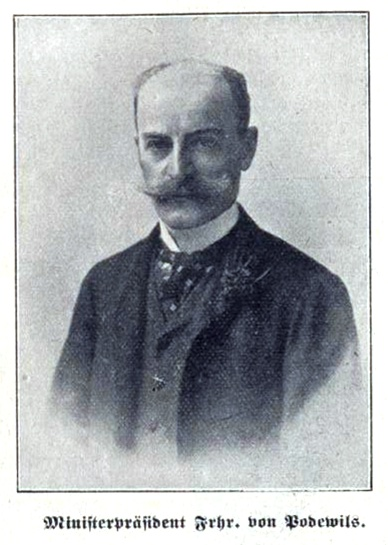

25th Minister President of the Kingdom of Bavaria
- In office 1 March 1903 – 9 February 1912
- Monarchs: Otto; Ludwig III
- Preceded by: Frederick Krafft Count of Crailsheim
- Succeeded by: Georg von Hertling

Personal details
- Born: Clemens von Podewils-Dürniz; 17 January 1850 Landshut
- Died: 14 March 1922 (aged 72) Munich

Hans Maria Clemens Franz Konstantin Freiherr (from 1911, Graf) von Podewils-Dürniz (17 January 1850 – 14 March 1922) was a Bavarian politician who served as Minister-President of Bavaria 1903–1912.

== Early life ==
His parents were the Bavarian colonel and Chamberlain Konstantin Freiherr von Podewils (1820–1887) and his wife Philippine von Juncker and Bigatto (1822–1900). The family originated from the Pomeranian noble family Podewils.

He studied jurisprudence in Munich and worked from 1872 to 1875 in the legal practice in Munich, Weilheim and Landshut. In 1879/80 he worked at the district council of Miesbach and the regional government of Upper Bavaria.

== Career ==
In 1881 he was Secretary of Legation at the Bavarian Legation in Berlin, and then in 1887 Counsellor and Envoy Extraordinary, later Minister Plenipotentiary of the Italian court. In 1896–1902 he was an extraordinary ambassador and authorised minister at the Austro-Hungarian court in Vienna.

=== Bavarian government ===
In 1902 he was appointed Bavarian Minister of the Interior for Church and School Affairs. On 1 March 1903 he took over the office of the chairman in the Council of Ministers, combined with the posts of Minister of State of the Royal House and Foreign Minister. In his term of office, a democratised Landtag election law (1906) and a reformed municipal suffrage (1908) were passed. He was regarded as the "favorite" of the Prince Regent Luitpold, but was replaced on 9 February 1912 by Georg von Hertling.

In 1918, Podewils represented Bavaria during the peace negotiations of Brest-Litovsk, with Russia.

=== Later life ===
In 1920/21 he worked as a plenipotentiary on the settling of the borders in Upper Silesia and West Prussia after the First World War.

== Personal life ==
On 14 April 1874 he married Baroness Friederike von Dürniz-Hienhard (1855–1923) in Munich. She was the only daughter and heiress of the last Baron von Dürniz-Hienhard. They had two sons and one daughter:

- Hans Karl von Podewils-Dürniz (1875–1948), a consul general in Nazi Germany; he married Marie Therese von Zwehl.
- Erdmann Karl von Podewils-Dürniz (1877–1950), who married Gertrud Smalian.
- Maria Helena von Podewils-Dürniz (1883–1963), who married Baron Karl von Liechtenstein.

He died in Munich on 14 March 1922.

Political offices
Preceded by Frederick Krafft Count of Crailsheim	Prime Minister of Bavaria; 1903–1912	Succeeded by Georg von Hertling
