= Ludwig II of Bavaria =

King of Bavaria from 1864 to 1886

Ludwig II
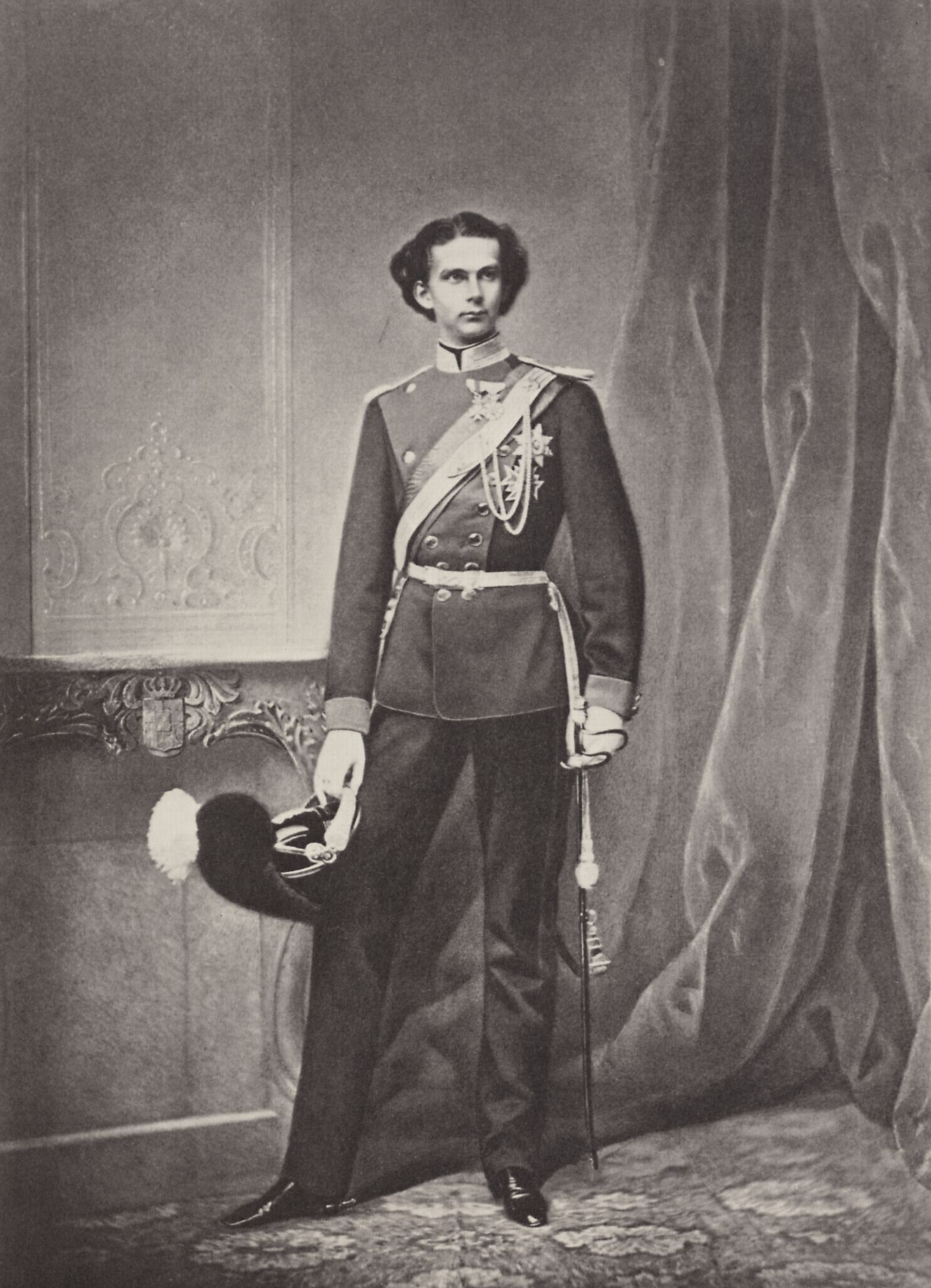

King of Bavaria
- Reign: 10 March 1864 – 13 June 1886
- Predecessor: Maximilian II
- Successor: Otto
- Prime Ministers: See list: Baron Karl Schrenck von Notzing; Max Ritter von Neumayr; Baron Karl Ludwig von der Pfordten; Chlodwig, Prince of Hohenlohe-Schillingsfürst; Count Otto von Bray-Steinburg; Baron Friedrich von Hegnenberg-Dux; Adolph von Pfretzschner; Johann von Lutz
- Born: 25 August 1845; Nymphenburg Palace, Munich, Bavaria
- Died: 13 June 1886 (aged 40); Lake Starnberg, Germany
- Burial: St. Michael's Church, Munich
Names
- Ludwig Otto Friedrich Wilhelm
- House: Wittelsbach
- Father: Maximilian II of Bavaria
- Mother: Marie of Prussia
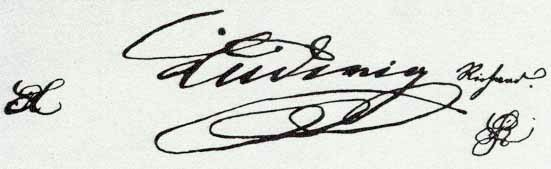
- Signature

Ludwig II (Louis II; Ludwig Otto Friedrich Wilhelm; German: [ˈluːtvɪç ˈɔto ˈfʁiː.dʁɪç ˈvɪlˌhɛlm]; 25 August 1845 – 13 June 1886), also called the Swan King or the Fairy Tale King (der Märchenkönig), was King of Bavaria from 1864 until his death in 1886.

He also held the titles of Count Palatine of the Rhine, Duke of Bavaria, Duke of Franconia and Duke in Swabia. Outside Germany, he is at times called "the Mad King" or Mad King Ludwig.

Ludwig ascended to the throne in 1864 at the age of 18. Two years later, Bavaria and its allies were defeated in the Austro-Prussian War. Despite his desire to preserve Bavaria's independence, the kingdom came under Prussian hegemony and joined the German Empire upon the unification of Germany in 1871. Ludwig increasingly withdrew from day-to-day affairs of state in favour of extravagant artistic and architectural projects. He commissioned the construction of lavish palaces: Neuschwanstein Castle, Linderhof Palace, and Herrenchiemsee. He was also a devoted patron of the composer Richard Wagner. Ludwig spent all his own private royal revenues (although not state funds as is commonly thought) on these projects, borrowed extensively, and defied all attempts by his ministers to restrain him. This extravagance was used against him to declare him insane, a determination that is now questioned.

Ludwig was taken into custody and effectively deposed on 12 June 1886; he and his doctor were found dead the following day. His death was ruled to be a suicide, a conclusion that is also now questioned. Today, his architectural and artistic legacy includes many of Bavaria's most important tourist attractions.

== Early life ==
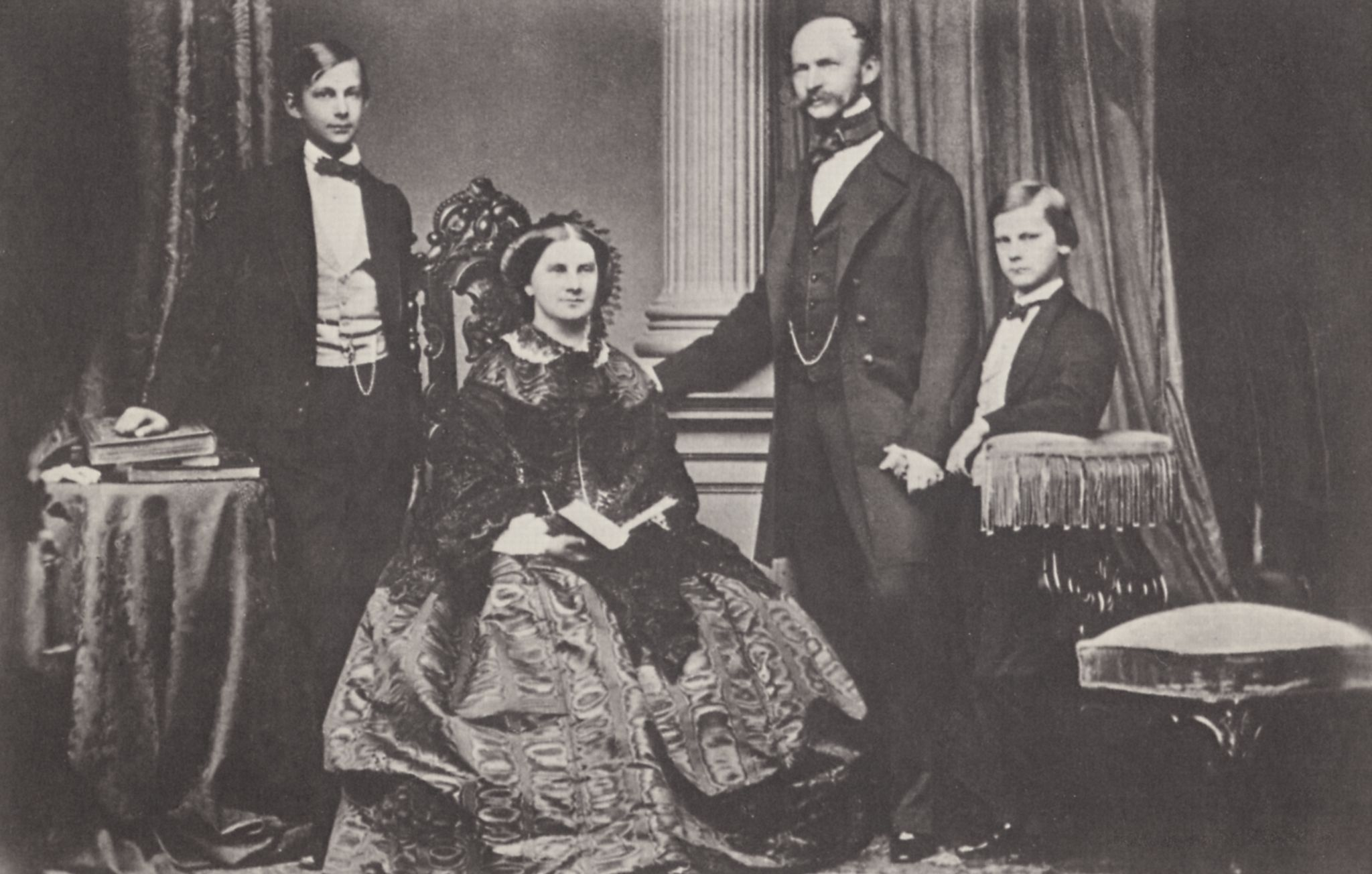
Crown Prince Ludwig of Bavaria (left) with his parents and his younger brother, Prince Otto, 1860

Born at Nymphenburg Palace, which is located in what is today part of central Munich, he was the elder son of Maximilian II of Bavaria and Marie of Prussia, Crown Prince and Princess of Bavaria, who became King and Queen in 1848 after the abdication of the former's father, Ludwig I, during the German revolution of 1848–1849.

His parents intended to name him Otto, but his grandfather insisted that his grandson be named after him, since their common birthday, 25 August, is the feast day of Saint Louis IX of France, patron saint of Bavaria (with Ludwig being the German form of Louis). In the early years, the family lived in the Wittelsbacher Palais in Munich, but after the father's accession to the throne in 1848, they moved to the Munich Residence.

Like many young heirs in an age when kings governed most of Europe, Ludwig was continually reminded of his royal status. King Maximilian II wanted to instruct both of his sons in the burdens of royal duty from an early age. Ludwig was both extremely indulged and severely controlled by his tutors and subjected to a strict regimen of study and exercise. Some point to the stresses of growing up in a royal family as cause for much of his odd behaviour as an adult.

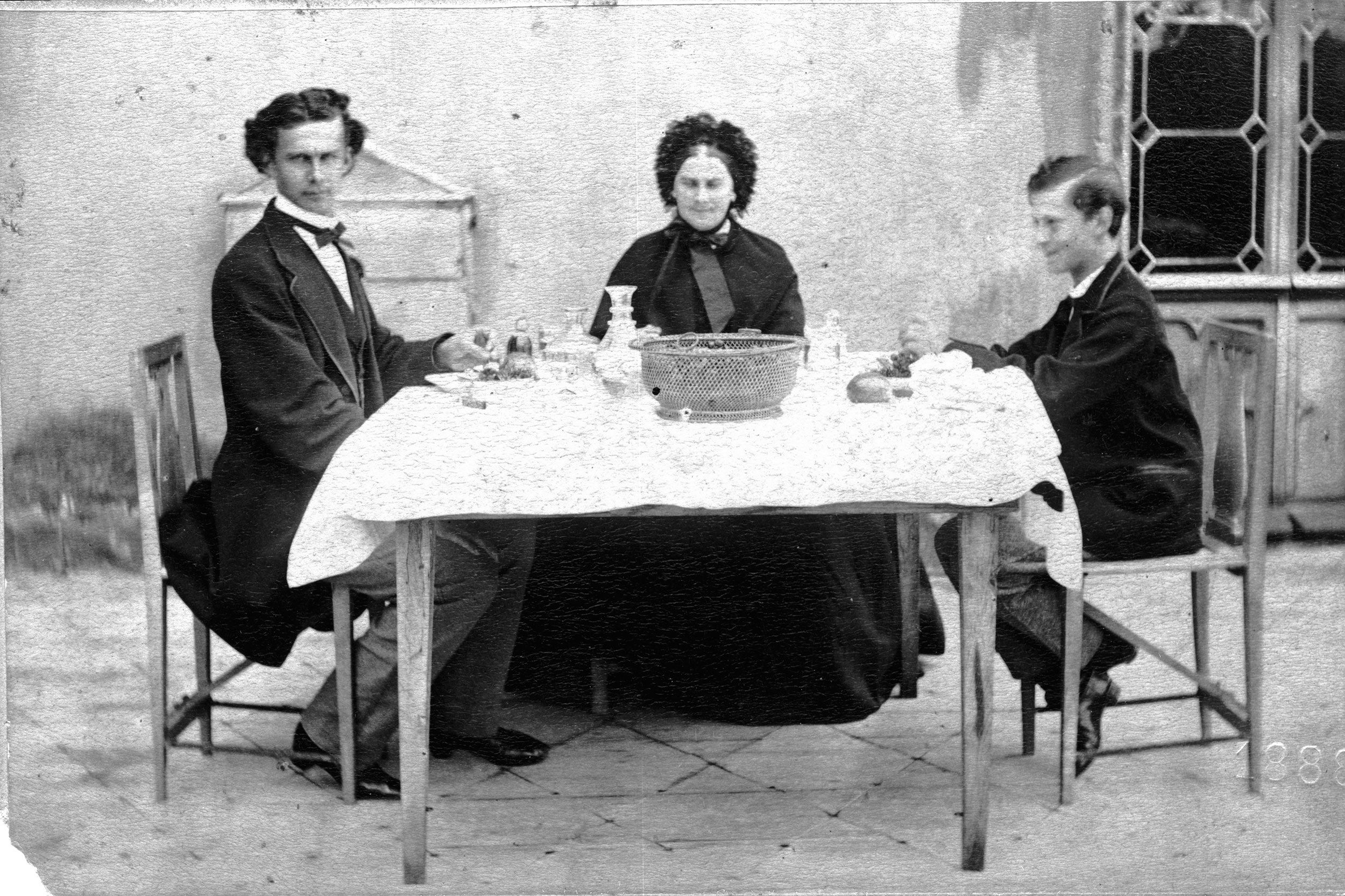
Crown Prince Ludwig (left) with his mother, Queen Marie and his younger brother Otto, c. 1863. Otto would become King of Bavaria after his older brother's death in 1886, although he would never actively rule due to his mental health problems.

Ludwig was not close to either of his parents. King Maximilian envisioned a strict upbringing that also included punishment and chastisement. When his advisers suggested that on his daily walks the King might like, at times, to be accompanied by his future successor, the King replied, "But what am I to say to him? After all, my son takes no interest in what other people tell him." The frosty father-son relationship was mutual; Ludwig later wrote, as a 30-year-old, to Crown Prince Rudolf of Austria-Hungary: "My father always treated me de haut en bas [from above], at most deigning to offer some gracious cold words en passant."

Marie, a Prussian princess by birth, unlike Ludwig, later welcomed the Proclamation of the German Empire in 1871, which was to be ruled by her cousin Emperor Wilhelm I in 1871. Her aversion to Richard Wagner had already alienated her from her son. She also found his friendship with the actress Lilla von Bulyovsky inappropriate. Unlike Ludwig, however, Marie was very sociable, and her lively chatter displeased him. After his accession to the throne, he increasingly avoided her and even referred to her as "my predecessor's consort." He was far closer to his grandfather, the deposed and notorious King Ludwig I.

Nevertheless, Ludwig's childhood years did have happy moments. The family spent their vacations and many public holidays at Hohenschwangau Castle, a late medieval building near the Alpsee (Alp Lake), which his father had transformed into a historicist fantasy castle. It was decorated in the Gothic Revival style with many frescoes depicting heroic German sagas, most notably images of Lohengrin, the Knight of the Swans. There, the mother and her sons undertook extensive mountain hikes while his father went hunting, something Ludwig never showed any interest in. The family also visited Lake Starnberg (then called Lake Würm) where they owned Berg Palace, a comparatively small hunting lodge from the Renaissance period, which - also remodeled in a historicist style - became one of Ludwig's favorite summer residences (and later the place of his death). When he was 16 years old, he attended the 1862 Fairytale Maskenfest, a costume ball themed around German fairytales.

As an adolescent, Ludwig began a friendship with his aide de camp, Prince Paul of Thurn and Taxis, a member of the wealthy Bavarian Thurn und Taxis family. The two young men rode together, read poetry aloud, and staged scenes from the Romantic operas of Richard Wagner. The friendship ended when Paul became engaged to a commoner in 1868. During his youth, Ludwig also initiated a lifelong friendship with his similarly eccentric cousin Duchess Elisabeth in Bavaria, the later empress of Austria and queen of Hungary.

== Early reign ==
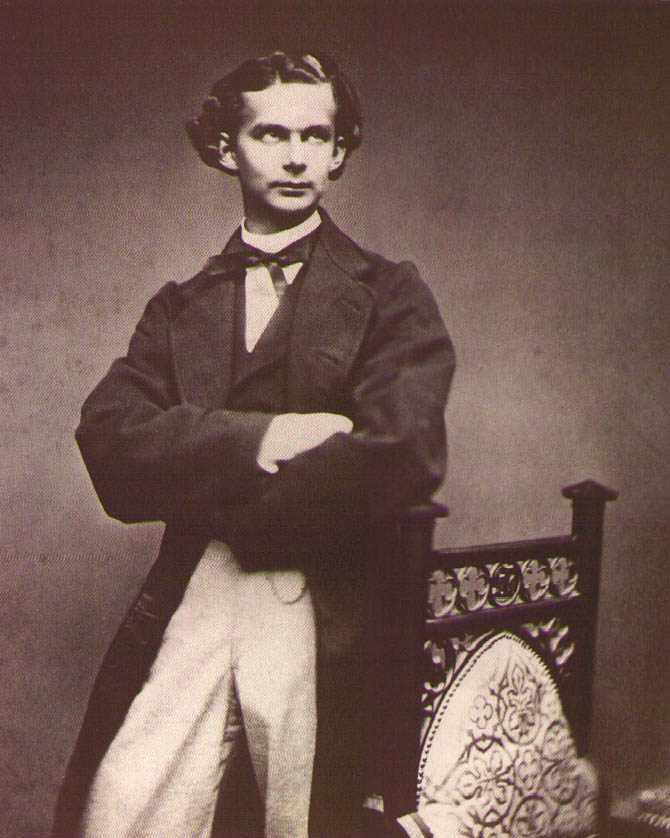
Ludwig II just after his accession to the throne of Bavaria in 1864

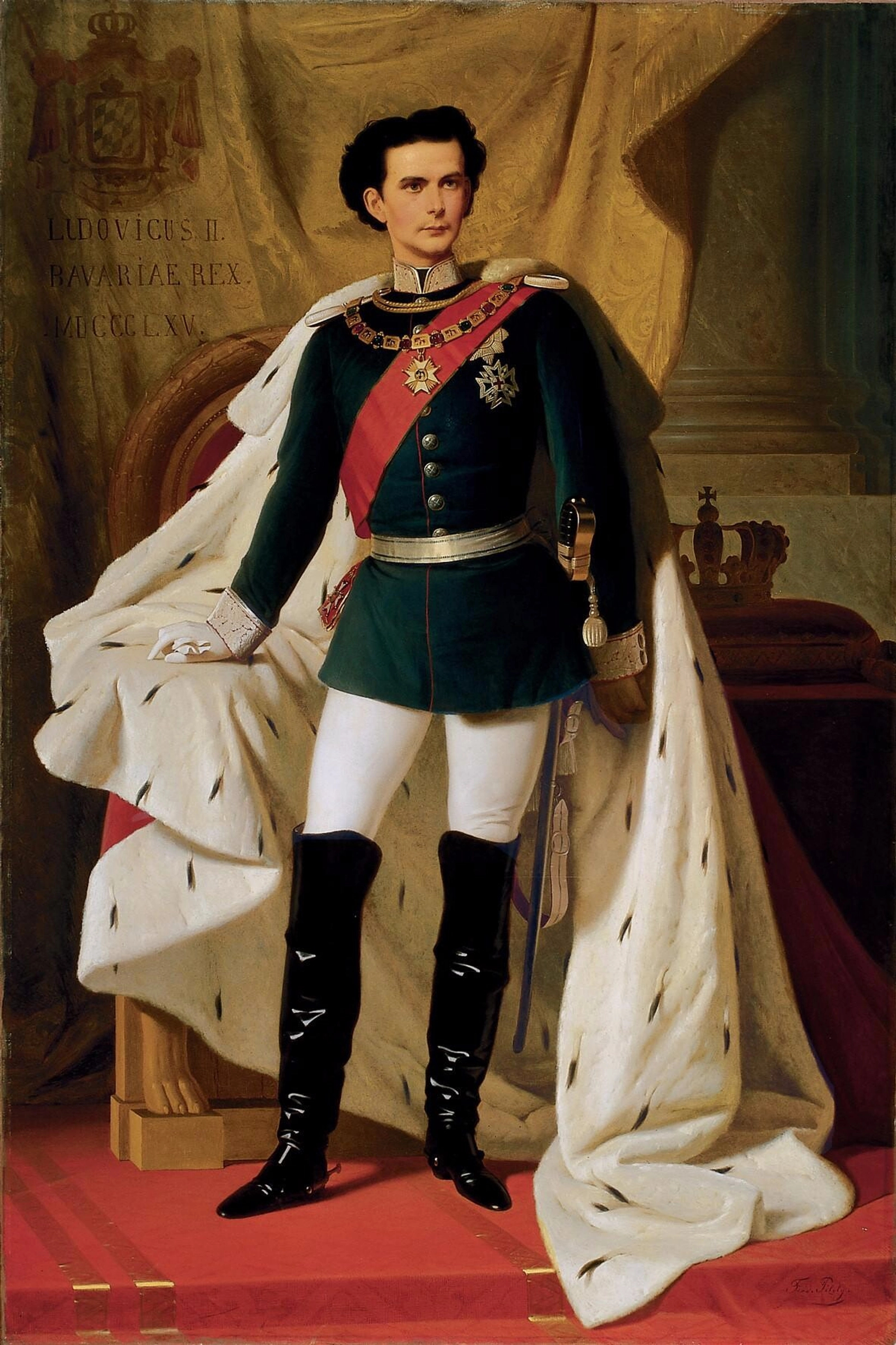
Ludwig II's coronation portrait, 1865

Crown Prince Ludwig was in his 19th year when his father died after a three-day illness, and he ascended the Bavarian throne. The new king was seen in public for the first time at Maximilian's funeral on March 14. At 6 ft 3.98 in (192.99 cm), Ludwig was exceptionally tall, especially for the time. Although he was not prepared for high office, his youth and brooding good looks made him popular in Bavaria and elsewhere. He continued the state policies of his father and retained his ministers. His real interests were in art, music, and architecture. One of the first acts of his reign, a few months after his accession, was to summon the composer Richard Wagner to his court. Also in 1864, he laid the foundation stone of a new Court Theatre, now the Staatstheater am Gärtnerplatz (Gärtnerplatz-Theater).

Ludwig's personality was at odds with serving as a head of state. He disliked large public functions and avoided formal social events whenever possible, preferring a life of seclusion that he pursued with various creative projects. After making regular public appearances and traveling the country for official visits in his early years, he later increasingly withdrew to his castles in the countryside, which, however, did not lessen his popularity among the populace. He last inspected a military parade on 22 August 1875 and last gave a court banquet on 10 February 1876.

His mother had foreseen difficulties for Ludwig when she recorded her concern for her introverted and creative son. He rarely visited his mother at Nymphenburg Palace anymore and only travelled to Hohenschwangau Castle when she was absent. He also increasingly avoided contact with other relatives, such as his first cousin Ludwig (the future King Ludwig III), who was half a year older, as he felt their boisterous manner within the family was not subservient or respectful enough. However, he retained a loving and caring affection for his younger brother Otto, who was suffering from increasing mental illness. But even after his withdrawal from public appearances, the king enjoyed traveling in the Bavarian countryside and chatting with farmers and labourers he met along the way. He also delighted in rewarding those who were hospitable to him during his travels with lavish gifts. He is still remembered in Bavaria as Unser Kini ("Our Cherished King" in the Bavarian dialect).

== Austro-Prussian and Franco-Prussian Wars ==
Unification with Prussia took center stage from 1866. In the Austro-Prussian War, which began in August, Ludwig's government supported the Austrian Empire against Prussia. Initially, the king had wanted to remain neutral and keep his country out of the direct fighting. However, Austria insisted on adherence to the alliance obligations agreed upon within the German Confederation. Austria and Bavaria were defeated, and the Kingdom of Bavaria was forced to sign a mutual defence treaty with Prussia. Ludwig, who had little interest in military matters since childhood, left war policy to his ministers, withdrawing from public life with his friend and aide-de-camp Paul von Thurn und Taxis to Berg Palace and Rose Island in Lake Starnberg. The leadership of the country effectively passed to the Council of Ministers. At the end of 1866, Prime Minister Karl Ludwig von der Pfordten was replaced by Chlodwig, Prince of Hohenlohe-Schillingsfürst, who, while supporting Prussia's claim to hegemony in German politics, rejected Bavaria's accession to the new federal state, the North German Confederation.

When the Franco-Prussian War broke out in 1870, Bavaria was required to fight alongside Prussia. After the Prussian victory over the Second French Empire, Chancellor Otto von Bismarck moved to complete the unification of Germany. In November 1870, Bavaria joined the North German Confederation, thus losing its status as an independent kingdom; however, the Bavarian delegation under Minister President, Count Otto von Bray-Steinburg, secured privileged status for Bavaria within the empire (Reservatrechte). Bavaria retained its own diplomatic corps and the Bavarian Army, which would come under Prussian command only in times of war.

In December 1870, Bismarck used financial concessions to induce Ludwig, with the support of the king's equerry, Maximilian Count von Holnstein, to write the Kaiserbrief, a letter endorsing the creation of the German Empire with King Wilhelm I of Prussia as Emperor. Nevertheless, Ludwig regretted Bavaria's loss of independence and refused to attend Wilhelm's 18 January proclamation as German Emperor in the Palace of Versailles. Ludwig's brother Prince Otto and his uncle Luitpold went instead.

In the Constitution of the German Empire, Bavaria was able to secure for itself extensive rights, in particular regarding military sovereignty. Not only did the Royal Bavarian Army retain, like the kingdoms of Saxony and Württemberg, its own troops, war ministry, and military justice system but was excluded from the empire-wide regimental renumbering of the army regiments and would only come under imperial control in times of war. Bavaria also kept its light-blue infantry uniforms, the Raupenhelm (until 1886), the light cavalry, and some other peculiarities. The officers and men of the Bavarian Army continued to swear their oaths to the King of Bavaria and not the German Emperor. Nevertheless, the uniform cut, equipment, and training was standardised to the Prussian model. When field-grey uniforms were introduced, only the cockade and a blue-and-white lozenge edging to the collar distinguished Bavarian units. Nevertheless, the king felt his sovereignty was diminished by the fact that an emperor now stood above him. He always made him feel it. When Wilhelm I passed through Munich on his return from a private trip, Ludwig forbade his mother from receiving her cousin at Nymphenburg, on the grounds that the royal family was not obliged to do so, as it was not a state visit.

Contrary to popular belief, Ludwig conscientiously carried out his official duties almost until the end of his life, despite his permanent absence from Munich. The cabinet secretary ensured smooth communication between the king and the ministers. Even when he was staying in his numerous remote mountain cabins, such as King's House on Schachen, communication with the cabinet secretary was ensured by means of telegraphy to the nearest post office. However, his receptions of ministers at Linderhof Palace, his almost permanent residence after the wars, became less and less frequent over the years. Ludwig often signed inquiries and documents with his own remarks and recommendations. He also intervened in appointments and petitions for clemency. He acquired some knowledge of economic policy and church-state relations. Ludwig II continued the personnel policies of his predecessors, whose scope for action was limited in the constitutional monarchy. The aim was always to neutralize political forces in the country and to keep the influence of the people's representatives as small as possible. The Bavarian kings generally appointed ministers against the majority in the kingdom's parliament, the Bavarian Assembly of Estates or Landtag.

When, in the aftermath of the 1866 war, the Catholic-conservative, anti-Prussian Patriotic Party won an absolute majority in the parliament, King Ludwig II appointed national-liberal and pro-Prussian ministers. His ministerial policy even contradicted his own political stance, which was closer to that of the Bavarian Patriots. More important to the king than appointing ministers in accordance with parliamentary mandates was the demonstration of his sovereignty.

Regarding Ludwig's political activities, historian Bernhard Löffler stated in a July 2010 interview with ZDF: ″On the one hand, a shift was already becoming apparent during the 1870s, which would lead to the king's withdrawal. In 1873, he himself spoke of seeking spiritual respite from the unbearable present. On the other hand, he also failed to demonstrate any particular political assertiveness from the outset.″ The fact that he had to countersign every law is simply a consequence of the Bavarian constitution and the constitutional system and has nothing to do with his own commitment. However, he possessed no tolerance for frustration, ″...because he lacked any understanding of how the constitutional system functioned.″ As a counter-model and a result of his religiosity, he increasingly immersed himself in the dream world of divine right and absolute monarchy, which he saw personified in his idol and namesake, Louis XIV, whose life (and especially his buildings) he studied intensively.

== Engagement and sexual orientation ==
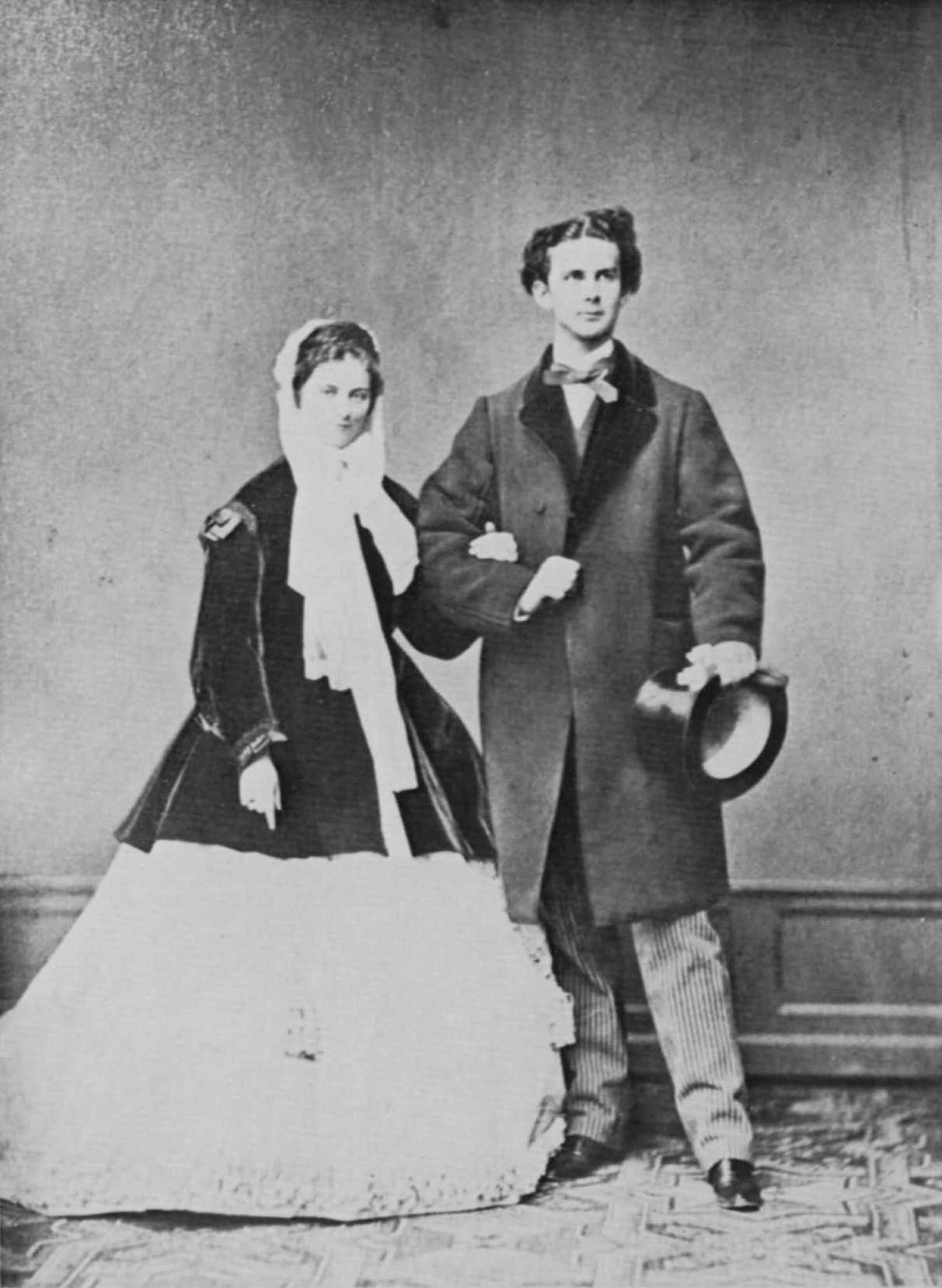
Ludwig II and his fiancée Duchess Sophie Charlotte in Bavaria in 1867

The greatest stress of Ludwig's early reign was the pressure to produce an heir, and this issue came to the forefront in 1867, after he had abruptly ended his long-standing, homoaffective relationship with his adjutant, Prince Paul of Thurn and Taxis, in November 1866. In January 1867 Ludwig became engaged to Duchess Sophie Charlotte in Bavaria, his 19-year-old cousin and the youngest sister of his dear friend, Empress Elisabeth of Austria. The engagement was announced on 22 January 1867. They shared a deep interest in the works of Richard Wagner; a few days prior to their engagement announcement, Ludwig had written to Sophie, "The main substance of our relationship has always been ... Richard Wagner's remarkable and deeply moving destiny." The king appeared publicly in the royal box at the opera alongside Sophie.

In the following months, there were several incidents in which Ludwig publicly displayed an ambivalent, callous and hurtful attitude towards Sophie. The king soon regretted his decision and doubted that Sophie would be happy at his side; he wrote to his mother that he would have a (platonic) ″angelic marriage″ with her. Even though such a marriage would have contradicted the dynastic goal of producing heirs, it would not have been unprecedented. For example, Frederick the Great of Prussia, the most famous member of Queen Marie's family of origin and a brother of her great-grandfather, had a similar marriage throughout his life with Elisabeth Christine of Brunswick-Wolfenbüttel-Bevern.

At the formal engagement ball on February 22, 1867, at the Bavarian Foreign Ministry, the shy king stayed for barely an hour before disappearing without a word from the throng of guests. He traveled by carriage to Berg Palace, repeatedly exclaiming: "I'd rather jump into the Alpsee... I'd rather jump into the Alpsee." In addition, in May 1867, the king met a riding master in the royal stables, the reserve officer of the artillery, Richard Hornig, with whom he very quickly began a secret, intimate love affair and whom he made his master of the horse and later his private secretary. Hornig accompanied Ludwig on a trip to Paris in July of that year.

Much to the family's dismay, Ludwig repeatedly postponed the wedding date. Alarmed by Ludwig's behavior and the repeated postponements, Sophie initially wrote him a letter offering him the option of withdrawing his engagement. In October, Duke Maximilian Joseph in Bavaria, Sophie's father, also wrote to Ludwig, urging him to either keep to the new wedding date or release Sophie, as he felt his daughter was compromised by the repeated postponements of the wedding. Ludwig finally cancelled the engagement in October. After the engagement was broken off, he wrote to his former fiancée, "My beloved Elsa! Your cruel father has torn us apart. Eternally yours, Heinrich." The names Elsa and Heinrich came from characters in Wagner's opera Lohengrin. At this point, the disappointment of the jilted bride seems to have been lessened by the fact that, precisely while taking the official bridal portraits, she had fallen in love with the court photographer Edgar Hanfstaengl, to whom she wrote in love letters that the royal engagement had put her ″freedom in chains″. Sophie later married Prince Ferdinand, Duke of Alençon, grandson of French King Louis Philippe I, at Possenhofen Castle at which Ludwig II unexpectedly attended the reception.

Ludwig never married nor had any known mistresses. His diary, private letters, and other documents reveal his strong homosexual desires, which he struggled to suppress to remain true to the teachings of the Catholic Church. Homosexuality had not been punishable in Bavaria since 1813, but the unification of Germany under Prussian hegemony in 1871 instated Paragraph 175, which criminalized homosexual acts between males.

Throughout his reign, Ludwig maintained a number of close friendships with men, besides Paul von Thurn und Taxis and Richard Hornig, the Hungarian theater actor Josef Kainz, and courtier Alfons Weber. Letters from Ludwig reveal that the quartermaster of the royal stables, Karl Hesselschwerdt, acted as his procurer. When Hornig married in 1870, the king did not forgive him; nevertheless, he later gave him a villa on Lake Starnberg, where he often invited himself for tea.

== Patronage ==
After 1871, Ludwig largely withdrew from politics and devoted himself to his personal creative projects, most famously his castles, for which he personally approved every detail of the architecture, decoration, and furnishing.

=== Ludwig and Wagner ===
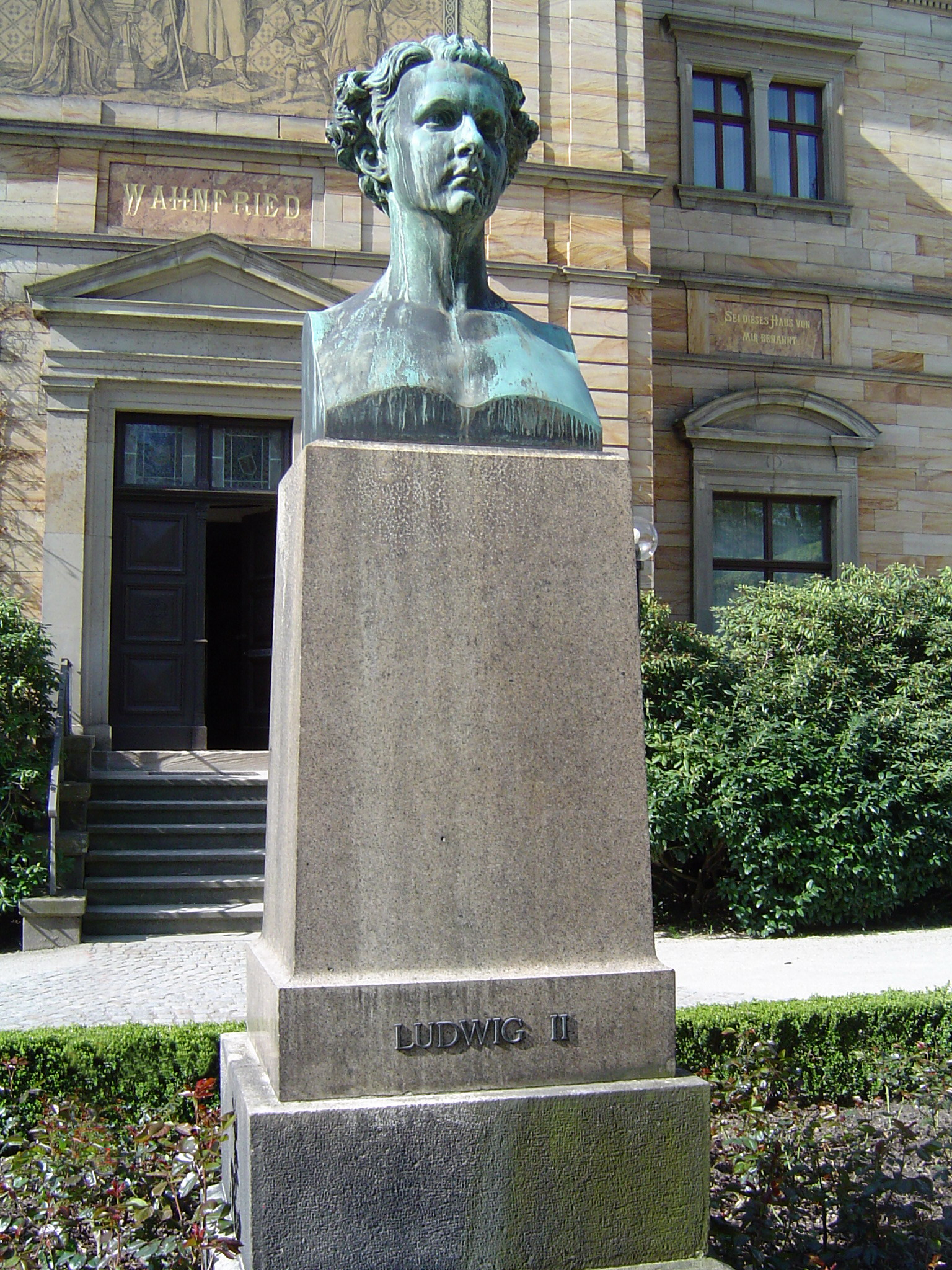
Bust of Ludwig II in front of Wahnfried, Richard Wagner's villa in Bayreuth, which Ludwig had paid for

Ludwig was intensely interested in the operas of Richard Wagner. This interest began when Ludwig first saw Lohengrin at the impressionable age of 15, followed by Tannhäuser ten months later. Wagner's operas appealed to the king's fantasy-filled imagination. Wagner had a notorious reputation as a political radical and philanderer who was constantly on the run from creditors. On 4 May 1864, the 51-year-old Wagner was given an unprecedented 1¾ hour audience with Ludwig in the Munich Residenz. Later, the composer wrote of his first meeting with Ludwig, "Alas, he is so handsome and wise, soulful and lovely, that I fear that his life must melt away in this vulgar world like a fleeting dream of the gods."

Ludwig was likely the savior of Wagner's career; without Ludwig, Wagner's later operas are unlikely to have been composed, much less premiered at the prestigious Munich Royal Court Theatre, which went on to become the Bavarian State Opera.

A year after meeting the King, Wagner presented his latest work, Tristan und Isolde, in Munich to great acclaim. The composer's perceived extravagant and scandalous behaviour in the capital was unsettling for the conservative people of Bavaria, and the King was forced to ask Wagner to leave the city six months later, in December 1865. Ludwig considered abdicating to follow Wagner, but Wagner persuaded him to stay. Ludwig provided the Tribschen residence for Wagner in Switzerland, where he visited him incognito on May 22, 1866. Wagner completed Die Meistersinger there; it was premiered in Munich in 1868. When Wagner returned to his "Ring Cycle", Ludwig demanded "special previews" of the first two works (Das Rheingold and Die Walküre) at Munich in 1869 and 1870. The reclusive monarch preferred to attend private performances in the royal box of an empty opera house.

Wagner was now planning his great personal opera house – the Bayreuth Festspielhaus. Ludwig initially refused to support the grandiose project. When Wagner exhausted all other sources, he appealed to Ludwig, who loaned him 100,000 thalers to complete the work. Ludwig also paid for the Wahnfried villa for Wagner and his family to reside in, constructed 1872–74. In 1876, Ludwig attended the dress rehearsal and third public performance of the complete Ring Cycle at the Festspielhaus but avoided the premieres with the honored guests, including Kaiser Wilhelm I and many other German monarchs.

=== Theatre ===
Ludwig's interest in theatre was by no means confined to Wagner. In 1867, he appointed Karl von Perfall as director of his new court theatre. Ludwig wished to introduce Munich theatre-goers to the best of European drama. Perfall, under Ludwig's supervision, introduced them to Shakespeare, Calderón, Mozart, Gluck, Ibsen, Weber, and many others. He also raised the standard of interpretation of Schiller, Molière, and Corneille.

Between 1872 and 1885, the King had 209 Separatvorstellungen (private performances) given for himself alone or with a guest, in the two court theatres, comprising 44 operas (28 performances of Wagner's operas including eight of Parsifal), 11 ballets, and 154 plays (the principal theme being Bourbon France) at a cost of 97,300 marks. This was not due so much to misanthropy but rather as the King complained to the theatre actor-manager Ernst Possart, "I can get no sense of illusion in the theatre so long as people keep staring at me, and follow my every expression through their opera-glasses. I want to look myself, not to be a spectacle for the masses."

=== Castles ===
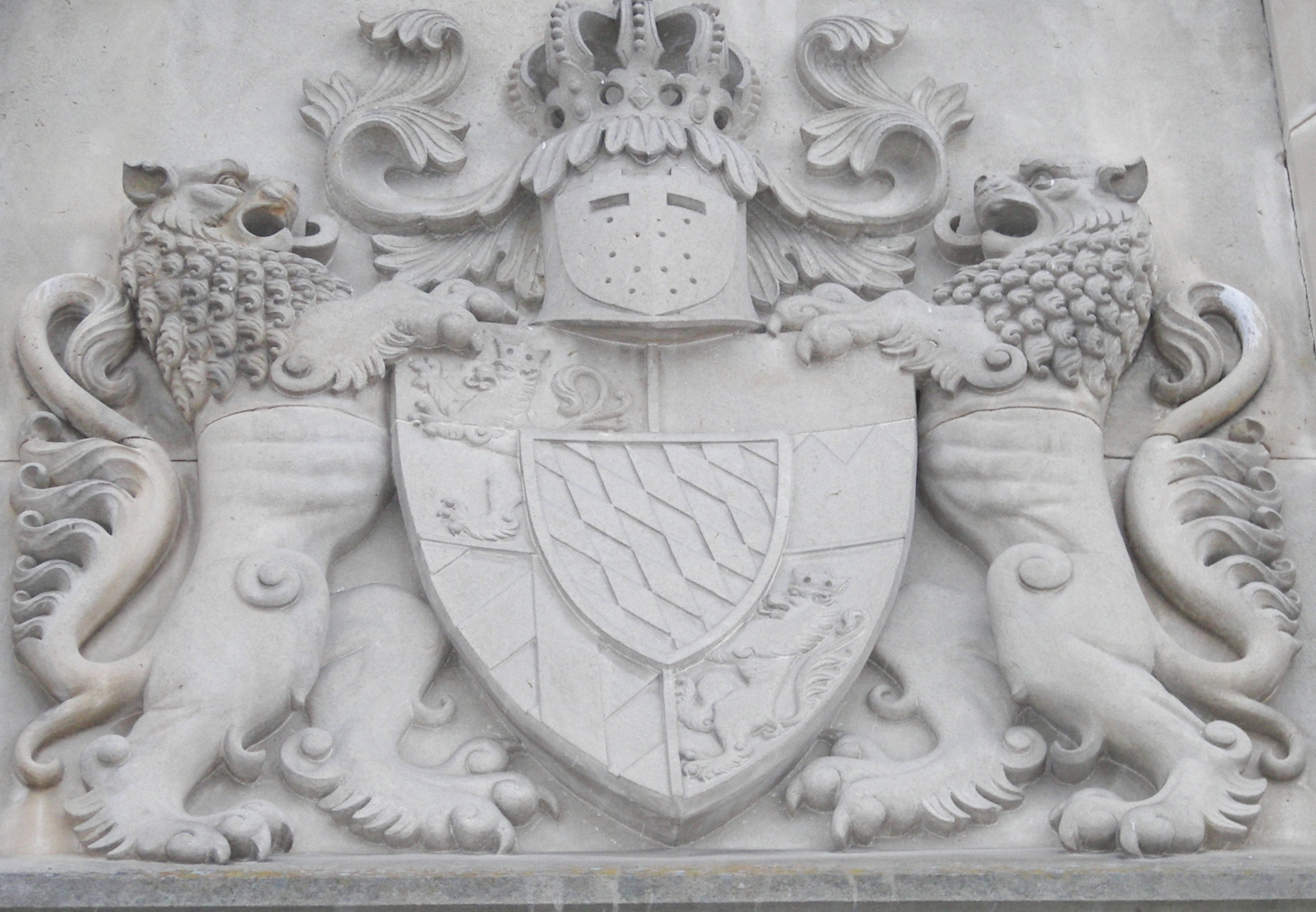
The coat of arms of King Ludwig over the entrance to Neuschwanstein Castle

Ludwig's main occupation was the construction of a series of elaborate castles. For this purpose he used his personal fortune and his annual grants from the government (4.2 million Bavarian guilders), called Zivilliste. However, a large portion of the budget had to be used for the ongoing upkeep of the court. The money available to the king at his free disposal was significantly increased by an annual subsidy of 270,000 German marks (1 guilder = 1.714 marks) from Chancellor Bismarck, which Ludwig received from 1873 onwards. These funds came from the so-called Welfenfonds,, or Guelph Fund, consisting of the sequestered assets of King George V of Hanover, who was defeated and dethroned by Prussia in 1866. (King George's widow, Queen Marie, along with her daughters, received only an annual pension of 240,000 marks from the Guelph Fund from 1879 onwards.

The Chancellor used other money from this slush fund, called the reptile fund, to influence the press.) With these means, the Chancellor ensured Bavaria's loyalty during the founding of the German Empire and especially afterwards. This pension ensured, among other things, that King Ludwig never appointed a government led by the anti-Prussian Bavarian Patriotic Party until his death. However, these politically sensitive payments, handled via Swiss banks, were made under the strictest secrecy.

Although Bismarck's Prussian policies ran counter to Bavarian sovereignty interests and were also despised by Ludwig, he maintained a cordial personal relationship with the Chancellor throughout his life. This was not solely due to the annual financial payments. Ludwig had only met Bismarck once in person, when he was still Crown Prince, at a banquet in Nymphenburg Palace. But Bismarck, eloquent and diplomatically skilled, towering in height and broad-shouldered, had impressed the young prince and had also gone to great lengths to flatter him. He had pointed out that his ancestor Nicolaus von Bismarck had been enfeoffed with Burgstall Castle in 1345 by Louis V, Duke of Bavaria, the Wittelsbach Margrave of Brandenburg, because of outstanding services in the margrave's administration, and had therefore referred to himself as a "vassal of the Wittelsbachs" Despite their single meeting, the two remained in correspondence until the end of Ludwig's life, and Bismarck made great efforts to keep the king in good spirits. Although the king thus had enormous financial resources at his disposal, these would ultimately prove insufficient for the megalomaniacal construction projects, plunging Ludwig into desperate debt and contributing to the end of his reign.

In 1867, Ludwig visited Eugène Viollet-le-Duc's work at the Château de Pierrefonds and the Palace of Versailles in France, as well as the Wartburg near Eisenach in Thuringia, which largely influenced the style of his construction. In his letters, Ludwig marvelled at how the French had magnificently built up and glorified their culture (e.g., architecture, art, and music) and how miserably lacking Bavaria was in comparison. His dream became to accomplish the same for Bavaria.

These projects provided employment for many hundreds of local labourers and artisans and brought a considerable flow of money to the relatively poor regions where his castles were built. Figures for the total costs between 1869 and 1886 for the building and equipping of each castle were published in 1968: Schloß Neuschwanstein 6,180,047 marks; Schloß Linderhof 8,460,937 marks (a large portion being expended on the Venus Grotto); and Schloß Herrenchiemsee (from 1873) 16,579,674 marks. In order to give an equivalent for the era, the British pound sterling, being the monetary hegemon of the time, had a fixed exchange rate (based on the gold standard) at £1 = 20.43 Goldmarks. In 1868, Ludwig commissioned the first drawings for his buildings, starting with Neuschwanstein Castle and Herrenchiemsee; work on the latter did not commence until 1878.

==== Neuschwanstein ====
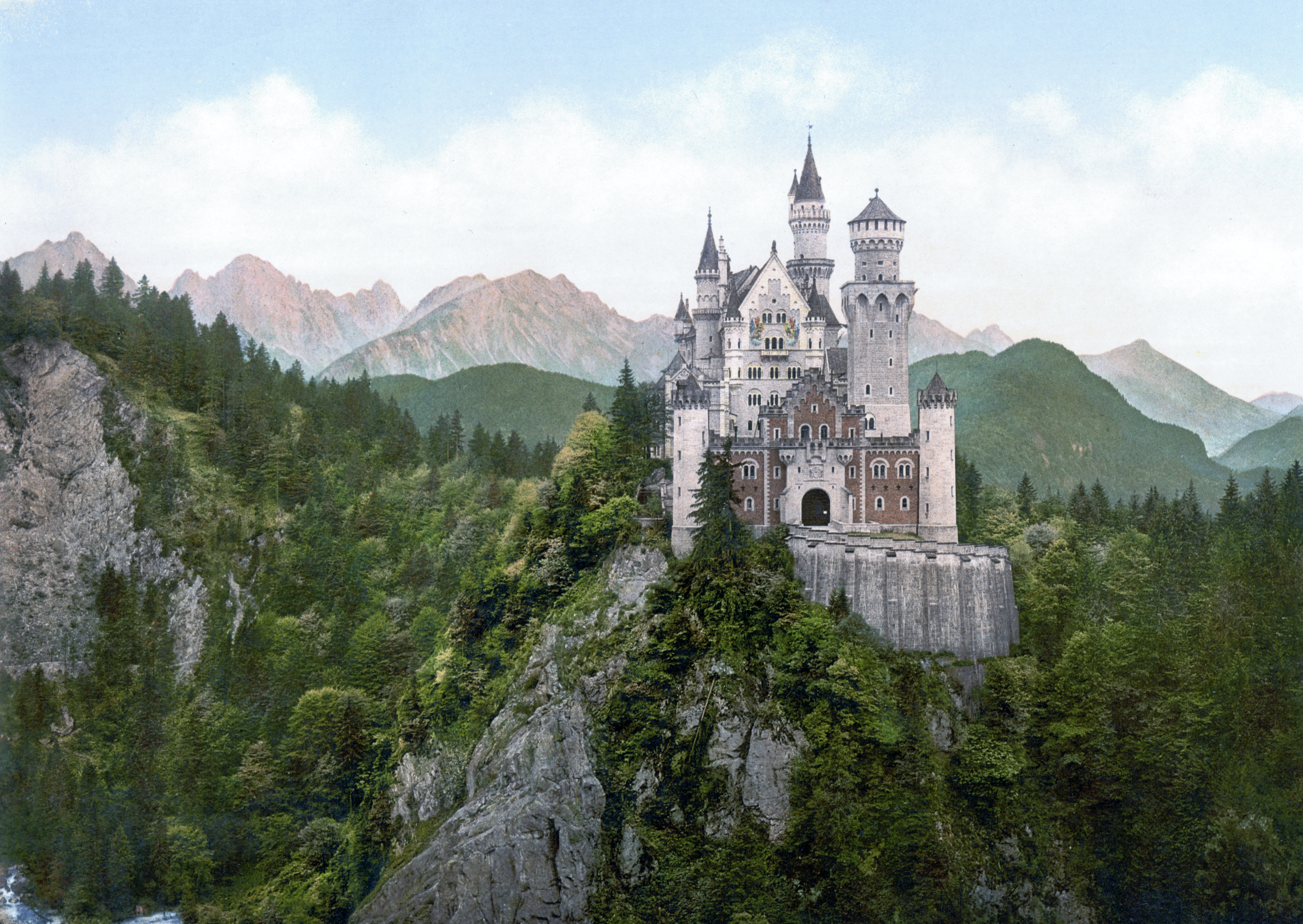
An 1890s photochrom print of Neuschwanstein Castle

Neuschwanstein Castle (New Swanstone Castle) is a dramatic Romanesque fortress with soaring fairy-tale towers. It is situated on an Alpine crag above Ludwig's childhood home, Hohenschwangau Castle. Ludwig reputedly had seen the location and conceived of building a castle there while still a boy.

In 1869, Ludwig oversaw the laying of the cornerstone for Neuschwanstein on a breathtaking mountaintop site. The walls of Neuschwanstein are decorated with frescoes depicting scenes from the legends used in Richard Wagner's operas, including Tannhäuser, Tristan und Isolde, Lohengrin, Parsifal, and the somewhat less than mystic Die Meistersinger.

==== Linderhof ====
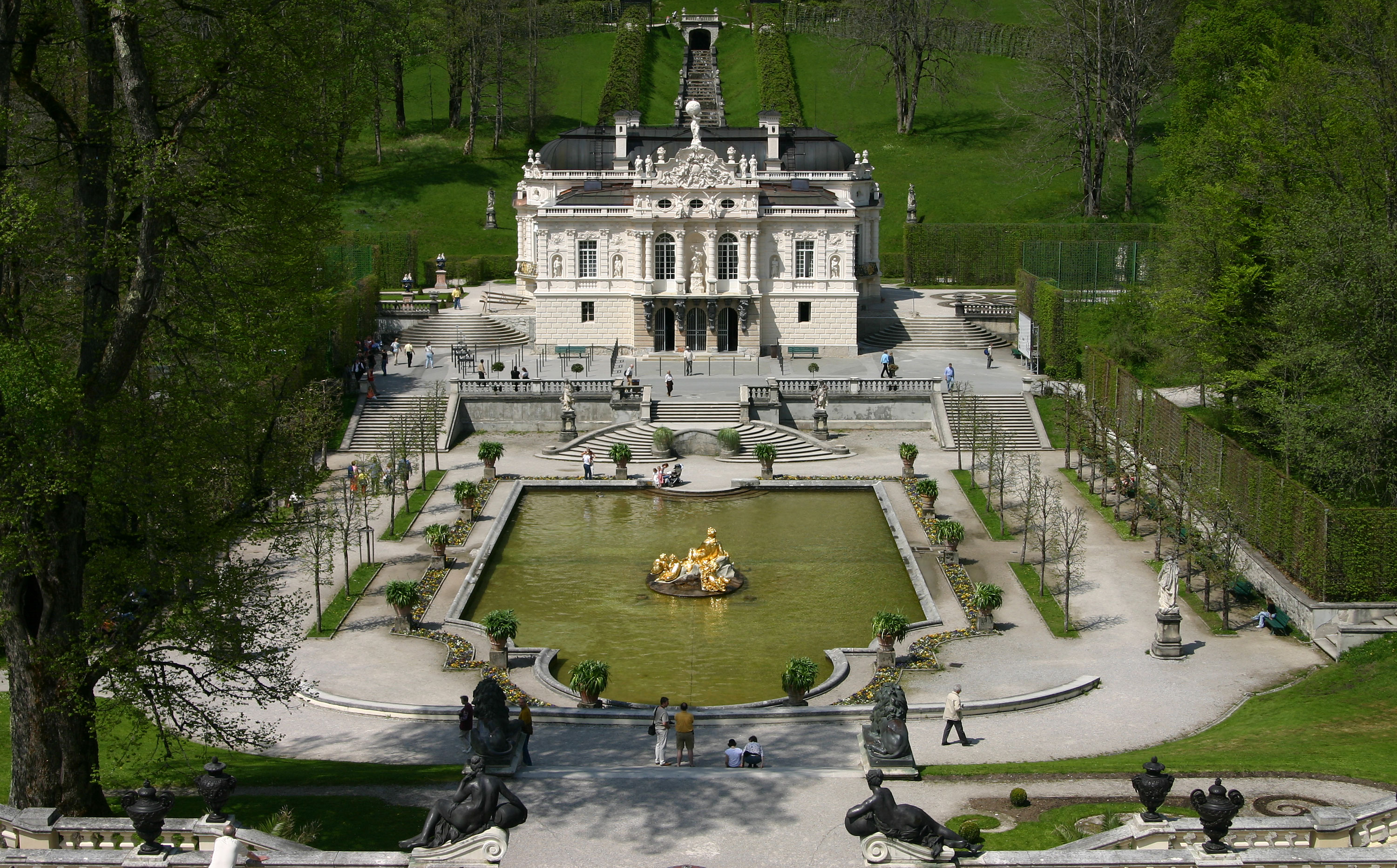
Linderhof Palace

In 1878, construction was completed on Ludwig's Linderhof Palace, an ornate palace in neo-French Rococo style, with handsome formal gardens. The grounds contained a Venus grotto lit by electricity, where Ludwig was rowed in a boat shaped like a shell. After seeing the Bayreuth performances, Ludwig built Hundinghütte (Hunding's Hut, based on the stage set of the first act of Wagner's Die Walküre) in the forest near Linderhof, complete with an artificial tree and a sword embedded in it; in Die Walküre, Siegmund pulls the sword from the tree. Hunding's Hut was destroyed in 1945, but a replica was constructed at Linderhof in 1990. In 1877, Ludwig had Einsiedlei des Gurnemanz (a small hermitage, as seen in the third act of Parsifal) erected near Hunding's Hut, with a meadow of spring flowers; a replica made in 2000 can now be seen in the park at Linderhof. Nearby, a Moroccan House, purchased at the Paris World Fair in 1878, was erected alongside the mountain road. Sold in 1891 and taken to Oberammergau, it was purchased by the government in 1980 and re-erected in the park at Linderhof after extensive restoration. Another building from the Paris World Exhibition is the Moorish Kiosk, including its peacock throne which Ludwig had added, a modern interpretation of the lost Peacock Throne of the emperors of the Mughal Empire in India.

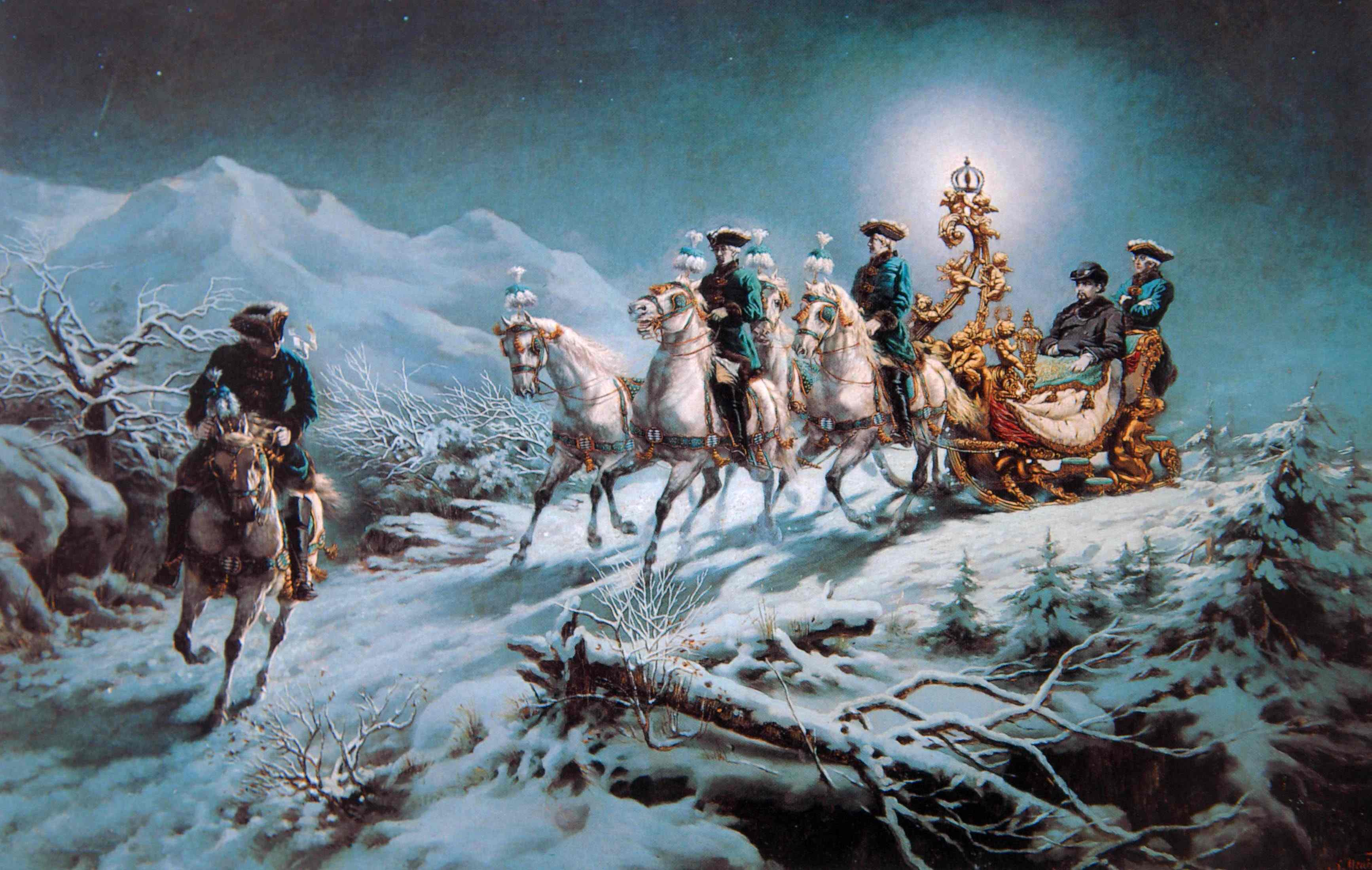
Ludwig on a night sleigh ride.

Inside the palace, iconography reflected Ludwig's fascination with France's absolutist government of the Ancien Régime. Ludwig saw himself as the "Moon King", a Romantic shadow of the earlier "Sun King", Louis XIV of France, because he had gotten into the habit of turning night into day and vice versa. From Linderhof, Ludwig enjoyed moonlit sleigh rides in an elaborate 18th-century style sleigh, complete with footmen in 18th-century livery. Only the king himself always wore contemporary clothing and not historical costumes. However, the lamp in the crown of the sleigh was electric and battery-operated. As in the legendary Venus Grotto in Linderhof, the king never shied away from creating perfect illusions through the use of the latest technologies which actually makes the "fairytale king" appear far more in tune with modernity than his seemingly backward-looking image.

==== Herrenchiemsee ====
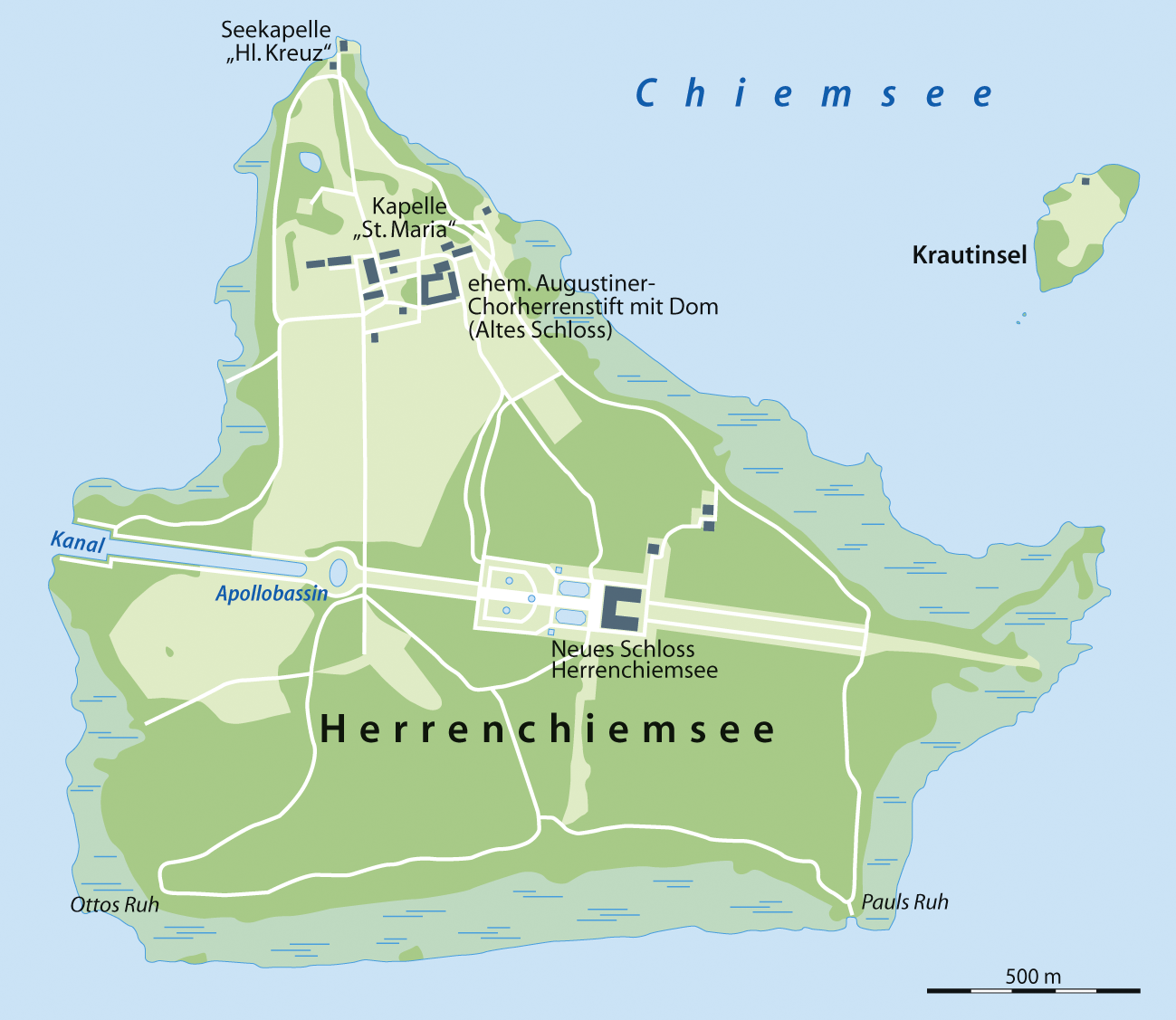
Herrenchiemsee Island

In 1878, construction began on Herrenchiemsee, a partial replica of the Palace of Versailles, sited on the Herreninsel in the Chiemsee. It was built as Ludwig's tribute to Louis XIV of France, the magnificent "Sun King". Only the central portion of the palace was built; all construction halted on Ludwig's death. What exists of Herrenchiemsee comprises 8,366 square metres (90,050 ft^{2}), a "copy in miniature" compared with Versailles' 551,112 ft^{2}.

==== Munich Residenz Palace royal apartment ====
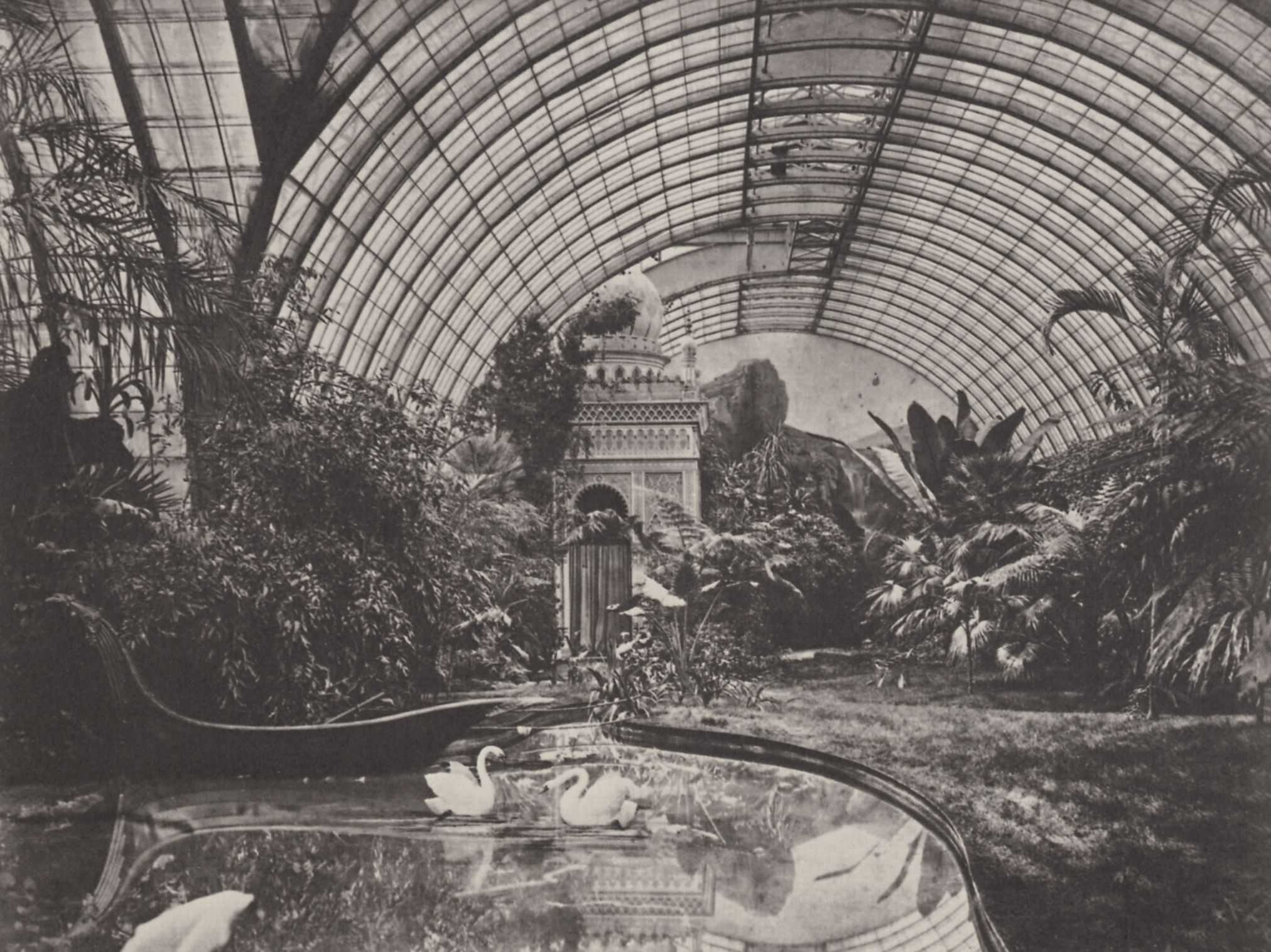
Winter garden on the palace roof, around 1870

The following year, Ludwig finished the construction of the royal apartment in the Residenz Palace in Munich, to which he had added an opulent conservatory or winter garden on the palace roof. It was started in 1867 as quite a small structure, but after extensions in 1868 and 1871, the dimensions reached 69.5 x 17.2 x 9.5 m.

It featured an ornamental lake complete with skiff, a painted panorama of the Himalayas as a backdrop, an Indian fisher-hut of bamboo, a Moorish kiosk, and an exotic tent. The roof was a technically advanced metal and glass construction. The winter garden was closed in June 1886, immediately after the death of the king, partly dismantled the following year, and demolished in 1897 after water leaked into the lower floors. (Note: See Die Wintergarten König Ludwigs II. in der Münchener Residenz by Elmar D. Schmid in Hojer, Schmid & Petzet 1986, pp. 62–94 & 446–451.) Large winter gardens were fashionable at the time, such as the Royal Greenhouses of Laeken, but the unique feature here was that it was placed on the roof due to a lack of space in the city center.

==== Later projects ====
In 1883, Ludwig planned the construction of a new castle on Falkenstein (Falcon Rock) near Pfronten in the Allgäu, a place he knew well: a diary entry for 16 October 1867 reads "Falkenstein wild, romantic". The first design was a sketch by Christian Jank in 1883 "very much like the Townhall of Liège". Subsequent designs showed a modest villa with a square tower, along with a small Gothic castle. (Note: See Petzet Katalog 1968 & Hojer, Schmid & Petzet 1986, pp. 298–304 for details.) By 1885, a road and water supply had been provided at Falkenstein, but the old ruins remained untouched.

Ludwig proposed a Byzantine palace in the Graswangtal, and a Chinese summer palace by the Plansee in Tyrol. These projects never got beyond initial plans. For Berg Castle, Ludwig had a fifth tower constructed for it called Isolde and used the castle frequently as his summer residence. When Maria Alexandrovna, Empress of Russia, visited Berg in 1868, he had the castle magnificently decorated for the duration of her stay there; the castle otherwise, by his standards, was modestly furnished.

== Controversy and struggle for power ==
Although Ludwig had paid for his pet projects out of his own funds and not the state coffers, that did not necessarily spare Bavaria from financial fallout. By 1885, he was 14 million marks in debt and had borrowed heavily from his family. Rather than economizing, as his financial ministers advised him, he planned further opulent designs without pause. He demanded that loans be sought from all of Europe's royalty and remained aloof from matters of state. Feeling harassed and irritated by his ministers, he considered dismissing the entire cabinet and replacing them with fresh faces. The cabinet decided to act first.

Seeking a cause to depose Ludwig by constitutional means, the rebelling ministers decided on the rationale that he was mentally ill and unable to rule. They asked Ludwig's uncle, Prince Luitpold, to step into the royal vacancy once Ludwig was deposed. Luitpold agreed on condition that the conspirators produced reliable proof that the king was in fact helplessly insane. Between January and March 1886, the conspirators assembled the Ärztliches Gutachten (Medical Report), on Ludwig's fitness to rule. Most of the details in the report were compiled by Count Maximilian von Holnstein, who was disillusioned with Ludwig and actively sought his downfall. Holnstein used bribery and his high rank to extract a long list of complaints, accounts, and gossip about Ludwig from among the king's servants. The litany of supposed bizarre behavior included his pathological shyness, his avoidance of state business, his complex and expensive flights of fancy, dining outdoors in cold weather and wearing heavy overcoats in summer, sloppy and childish table manners, dispatching servants on lengthy and expensive voyages to research architectural details in foreign lands, and violent threats of abuse to his servants.

The degree to which these accusations were accurate may never be known. The conspirators approached Chancellor Otto von Bismarck, who doubted the report's veracity, calling it "rakings from the King's wastepaper-basket and cupboards". Bismarck commented after reading the report that "the Ministers wish to sacrifice the King, otherwise they have no chance of saving themselves". He suggested that the matter be brought before the Bavarian Diet and discussed there but did not stop the ministers from carrying out their plan.

In early June, the report was finalized and signed by a panel of four psychiatrists: Bernhard von Gudden, chief of the Munich Asylum; Hubert von Grashey (who was Gudden's son-in-law); and their colleagues, Friedrich Wilhelm Hagen and Max Hubrich. The report declared in its final sentences that the king suffered from paranoia and concluded, "Suffering from such a disorder, freedom of action can no longer be allowed and Your Majesty is declared incapable of ruling, which incapacity will be not only for a year's duration, but for the length of Your Majesty's life." The men had never met the king, except for Gudden, only once, 12 years earlier, and none had ever examined him. Questions about the lack of medical diagnosis make the legality of the deposition controversial. Adding to the controversy are the mysterious circumstances under which King Ludwig died. Today, the claim of paranoia is not considered correct; Ludwig's behavior is rather interpreted as a schizotypal personality disorder, and he may also have suffered from Pick's disease during his last years, an assumption supported by a frontotemporal lobar degeneration mentioned in the autopsy report.

Ludwig's only younger brother and successor, Otto, was considered insane, providing a convenient basis for the claim of hereditary insanity.

In the context of the sexual abuse discussion, the controversial theory has recently been put forward that Ludwig even summoned numerous cavalrymen from his eight Chevau-léger Regiments, young recruits, for guard duty at Linderhof and sexually abused them. This theory was developed by the Heidelberg psychiatrist and neurologist Heinz Häfner, although there is hardly any documentary evidence. However, biographer Oliver Hilmes also considers this to be one of the main reasons for the king's eventual incapacitation and internment, as well as the establishment of the regency.

== Deposition ==
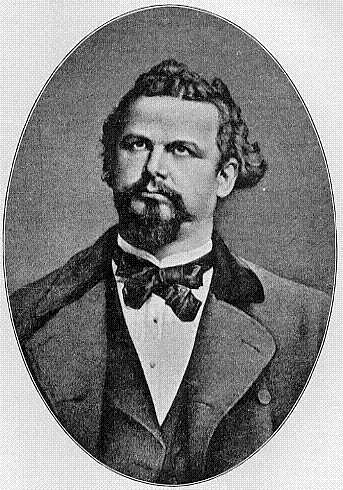
Ludwig II towards the end of his life around 1882

At 4 am on 10 June 1886, a government commission including Holnstein and Gudden arrived at Neuschwanstein to deliver the document of deposition to King Ludwig formally and to place him in custody. Tipped off an hour or two earlier by a faithful servant, his coachman Fritz Osterholzer, Ludwig ordered the local police to protect him, and the commissioners were turned back from the castle gate at gunpoint. In an infamous sideshow, the commissioners were attacked by the 47-year-old baroness Spera von Truchseß, out of loyalty to the king, who flailed at the men with her umbrella and then rushed to the king's apartments to identify the conspirators. Ludwig then had the commissioners arrested, but after holding them captive for several hours, released them.

Prince Ludwig Ferdinand of Bavaria was the only member of the royal family who always remained on friendly terms with his cousin (with the exception of Elisabeth, Empress of Austria), so Ludwig II wrote him a telegram; the latter immediately intended to follow this call but was prevented from leaving his home at Nymphenburg Palace by his uncle Luitpold, who was about to take over government as the ruling Prince Regent. That same day, the government under Minister-President Johann von Lutz publicly proclaimed Luitpold as Prince Regent. Ludwig's friends and allies urged him to flee, or to show himself in Munich, and thus regain the support of the people. Ludwig hesitated, instead issuing a statement, allegedly drafted by his aide-de-camp, Count Alfred Dürckheim, which was published by a Bamberg newspaper on 11 June:

The Prince Luitpold intends, against my will, to ascend to the regency of my land, and my erstwhile ministry has, through false allegations regarding the state of my health, deceived my beloved people, and is preparing to commit acts of high treason. ... I call upon every loyal Bavarian to rally around my loyal supporters to thwart the planned treason against the King and the fatherland.

The government succeeded in suppressing the statement by seizing most copies of the newspaper and handbills. Anton Sailer's pictorial biography of Ludwig contains a photograph of this rare document. The authenticity of the Royal Proclamation is doubted, as it is dated 9 June, before the commission arrived, it uses I instead of the royal We, and orthographic errors are included. As Ludwig dithered, his support waned. Peasants who rallied to his cause were dispersed, and the police who guarded his castle were replaced by a police detachment of 36 men who sealed off all entrances to the castle. Eventually, Ludwig decided he would try to escape, but he was too late. In the early hours of 12 June, a second commission arrived. Ludwig was seized just after midnight and at 4 am was taken to a waiting carriage. He asked Gudden, "How can you declare me insane? After all, you have never seen or examined me before", only to be told that "it was unnecessary; the documentary evidence [the servants' reports] is very copious and completely substantiated. It is overwhelming." Ludwig was transported to Berg Castle on the shores of Lake Starnberg, south of Munich.

== Death ==
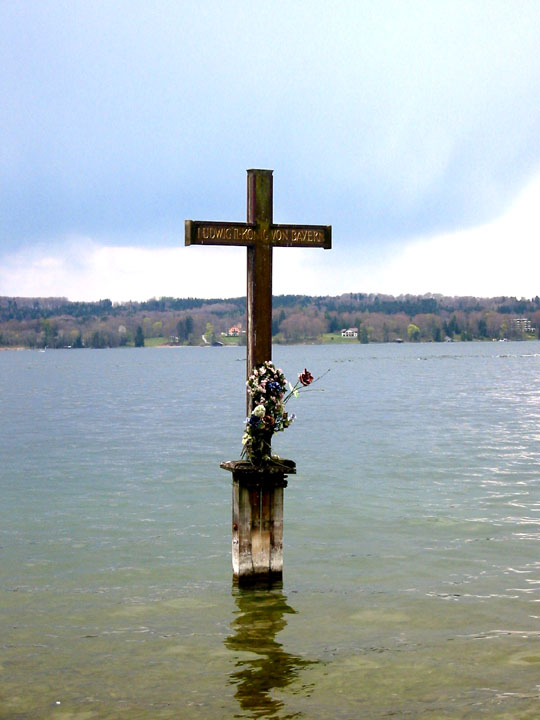
Memorial Cross at the site where the body of Ludwig II was found in Lake Starnberg

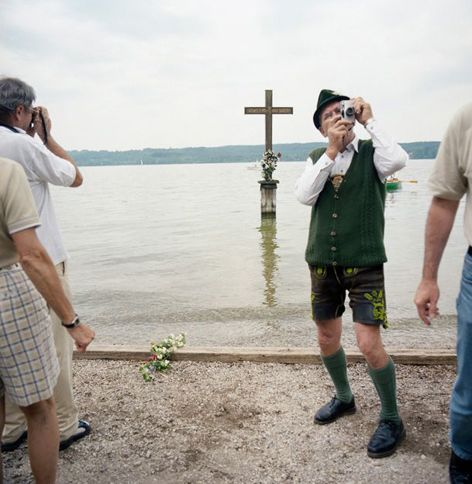
Participants of the yearly commemoration at the memorial Cross

On the afternoon of the next day, 13 June 1886, Gudden accompanied Ludwig on a stroll in the grounds of Berg Castle. They were escorted by two attendants. On their return, Gudden expressed optimism to other doctors concerning the treatment of his royal patient.

Following dinner, at around 6 pm, Ludwig asked Gudden to accompany him on a further walk, this time through the Schloß Berg parkland along the shore of Lake Starnberg. Gudden agreed; the walk may even have been his suggestion, and he told the aides not to join them. His words were ambiguous (Es darf kein Pfleger mitgehen, "No attendant may walk with [us]"). Whether they were meant to follow at a discreet distance is not clear. The two men were last seen at about 6:30 pm; they were due back at 8 pm but never returned.

After searches were made for more than two hours by the entire castle staff in a gale with heavy rain, at 10:30 pm that night, the bodies of both Ludwig and Gudden were found, head and shoulders above the shallow water near the shore. Ludwig's watch had stopped at 6:54. Gendarmes patrolling the park had neither seen nor heard anything unusual.

Ludwig's death was officially ruled a suicide by drowning; the official autopsy report indicated that no water was found in his lungs, but laryngospasm may have prevented this. Ludwig was a very strong swimmer in his youth, the water was approximately waist deep where his body was found, and he had not expressed suicidal feelings during the crisis. Gudden's body showed blows to the head and neck and signs of strangulation, leading to the suspicion that he was strangled, although no other evidence was found to support this. Another theory suggests that Ludwig died of natural causes, such as a heart attack or stroke, brought on by the cool water (12 °C (54 °F)) of the lake during an escape attempt.

=== Murder theory ===
Speculation exists that Ludwig was murdered by his enemies while attempting to escape from Berg. One account suggests that Ludwig was shot. His personal fisherman, Jakob Lidl (1864–1933), stated, "Three years after the king's death I was made to swear an oath that I would never say certain things – not to my wife, not on my deathbed, and not to any priest ... The state has undertaken to look after my family if anything should happen to me in either peacetime or war." Lidl kept his oath, at least orally, but left behind notes that were found after his death. According to Lidl, he had hidden behind bushes with his boat, waiting to meet Ludwig, to row him out into the lake, where loyalists were waiting to help him escape. Lidl wrote, "As the king stepped up to his boat and put one foot in it, a shot rang out from the bank, apparently killing him on the spot, for the king fell across the bow of the boat." However, the postmortem report indicates that no scars or wounds were found on the body. Many years later, Countess Josephine von Wrbna-Kaunitz would show her afternoon tea guests a grey Loden coat with two bullet holes in the back, asserting it was the one Ludwig had been wearing.

=== Funeral ===
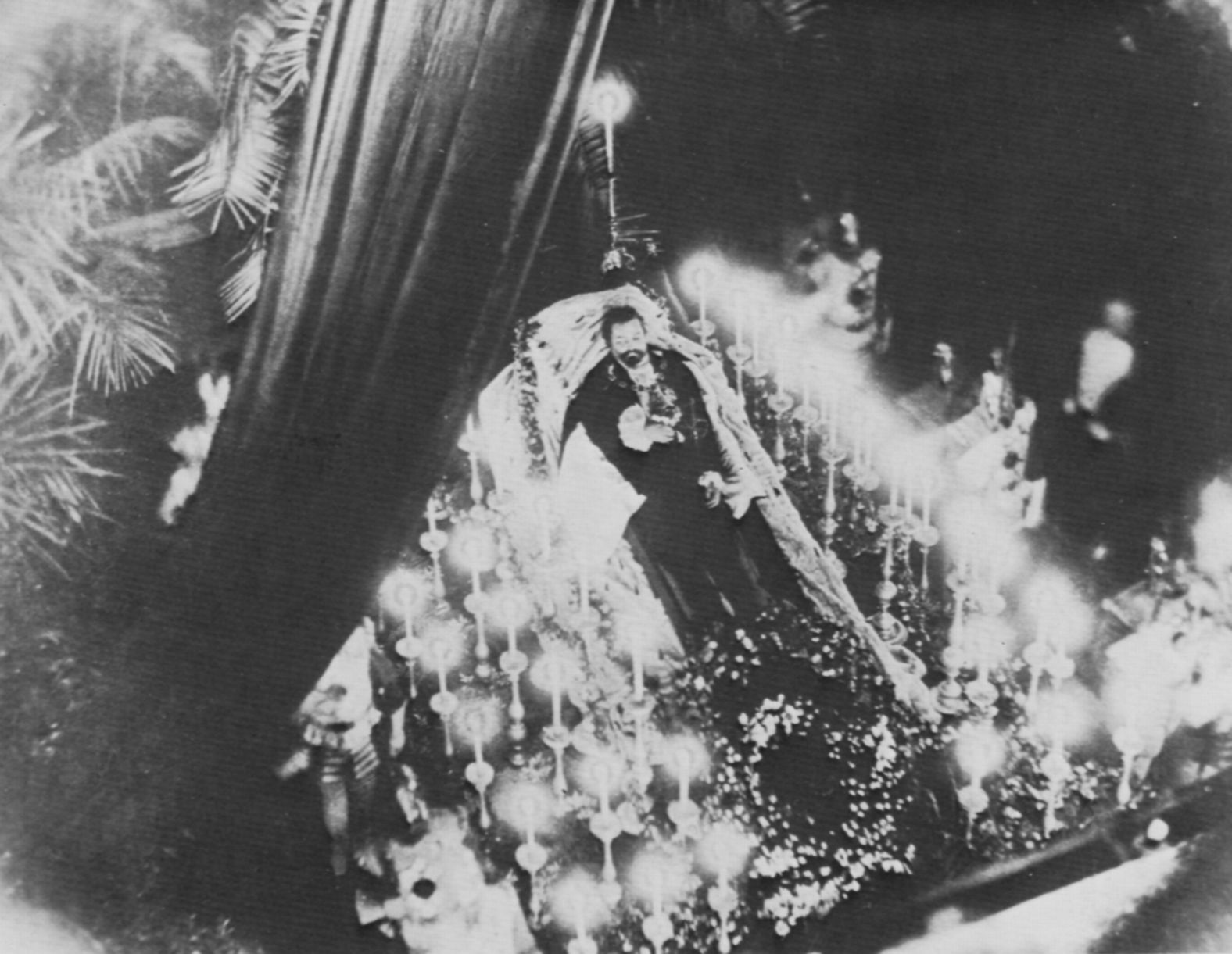
Laying in state of the king, 16–18 June 1886

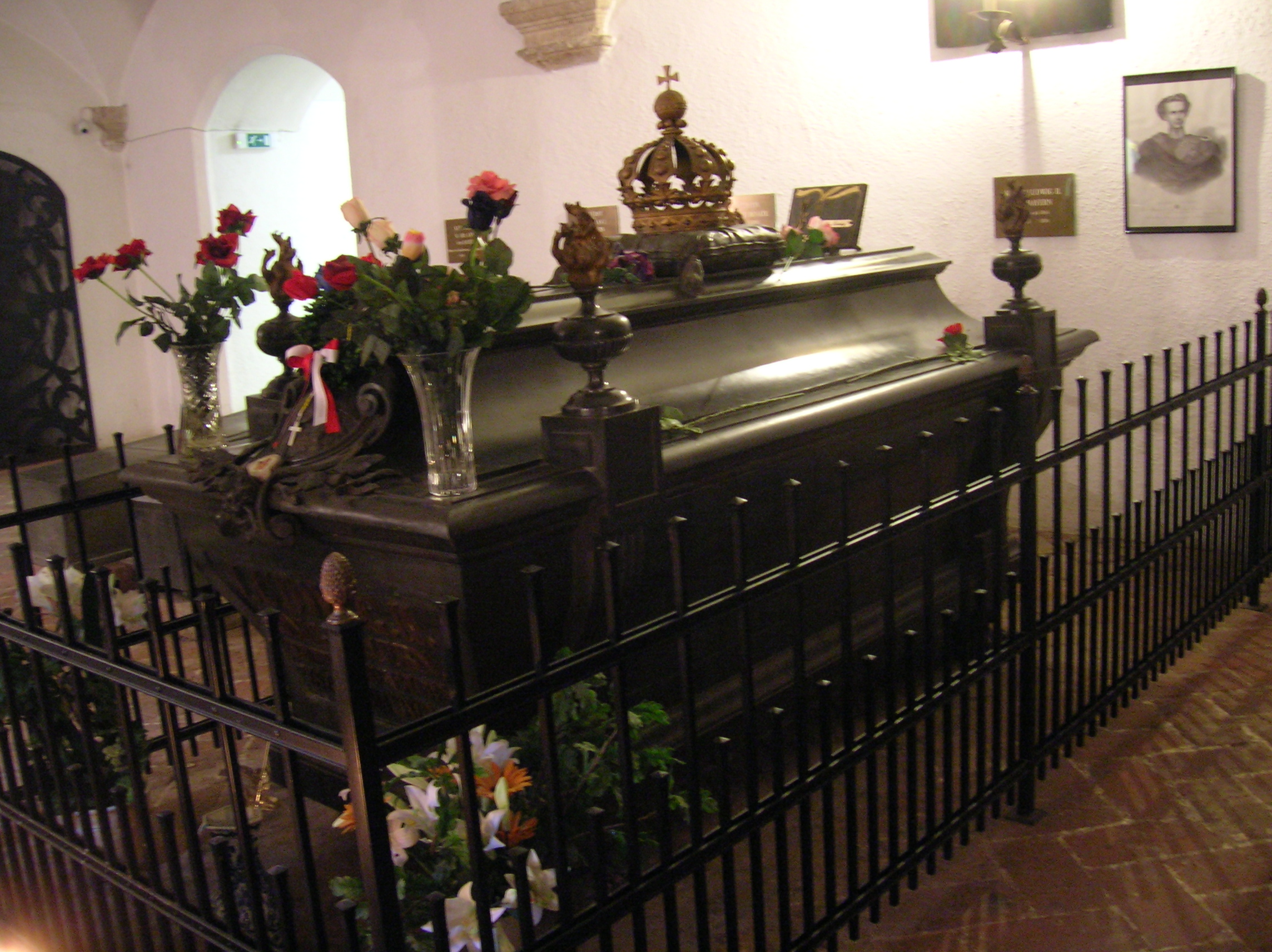
Coffin at St. Michael's Church, Munich

Ludwig's remains were dressed in the regalia of the Order of Saint Hubert, and lay in state in the royal chapel at the Munich Residenz. In his right hand, he held a posy of white jasmine picked for him by his cousin the Empress Elisabeth of Austria.

After an elaborate funeral on 19 June 1886 and a funeral procession through Munich, Ludwig's remains were interred in the crypt of St. Michael's Church, Munich. His heart does not lie with the rest of his body. Bavarian tradition called for the heart of the king to be placed in a silver urn and sent to Shrine of Our Lady of Altötting, where it was placed beside those of his father and grandfather. Three years after his death, a small memorial chapel was built overlooking the site of his death and a cross was erected in the lake. A remembrance ceremony is held in Altötting each year on 13 June.

=== Succession ===
Ludwig was succeeded by his brother Otto. Since Otto was considered incapacitated by mental illness due to a diagnosis by Gudden and had been under medical supervision since 1883, the king's uncle Luitpold remained regent. Luitpold maintained the regency until his own death in 1912 at the age of 91. He was succeeded as regent by his eldest son, also named Ludwig. The regency lasted for 13 more months until November 1913, when Regent Ludwig deposed the still-living but still-institutionalized King Otto, and declared himself King Ludwig III of Bavaria. His reign lasted until the end of World War I, when monarchy in all of Germany came to an end.

== Legacy ==
Although many considered Ludwig peculiar, the question of clinical insanity remains unresolved. The prominent German brain researcher Heinz Häfner disagreed with the contention that clear evidence existed for Ludwig's insanity. Others believe he may have suffered from the effects of chloroform used in an effort to control chronic toothache rather than any psychological disorder. His cousin and friend, Empress Elisabeth, held that, "The King was not mad; he was just an eccentric living in a world of dreams. They might have treated him more gently, and thus perhaps spared him so terrible an end." One of Ludwig's most quoted sayings was, "I wish to remain an eternal enigma to myself and to others."

The castles responsible for the king's financial ruin have today become profitable tourist attractions for the Bavarian state. The palaces, given to Bavaria by Ludwig III's son Crown Prince Rupprecht in 1923, attract millions of tourists to Germany each year and have funded themselves via their revenue.

=== Architecture ===
Ludwig had a great interest in architecture. His paternal grandfather, King Ludwig I, had largely rebuilt Munich. It was known as the Athens on the Isar. His father, King Maximilian II, had also continued with more construction in Munich, as well as the construction of Hohenschwangau Castle, the childhood home of Ludwig II, near the future Neuschwanstein Castle of Ludwig II. Ludwig II had planned to build a large opera house on the banks of the Isar River in Munich. This plan was vetoed by the Bavarian government. Using similar plans, a festival theatre was built later in his reign from Ludwig's personal finances at Bayreuth.

- Winter Garden, Residenz Palace, Munich, an elaborate winter garden built on the roof of the Residenz Palace in Munich. It featured an ornamental lake with gardens and painted frescos. It was roofed over using a technically advanced metal and glass construction. After the death of Ludwig II, it was dismantled in 1897 due to water leaking from the ornamental lake through the ceiling of the rooms below. Photographs and sketches still record this incredible creation which included a grotto, a Moorish kiosk, an Indian royal tent, an artificially illuminated rainbow and intermittent moonlight.

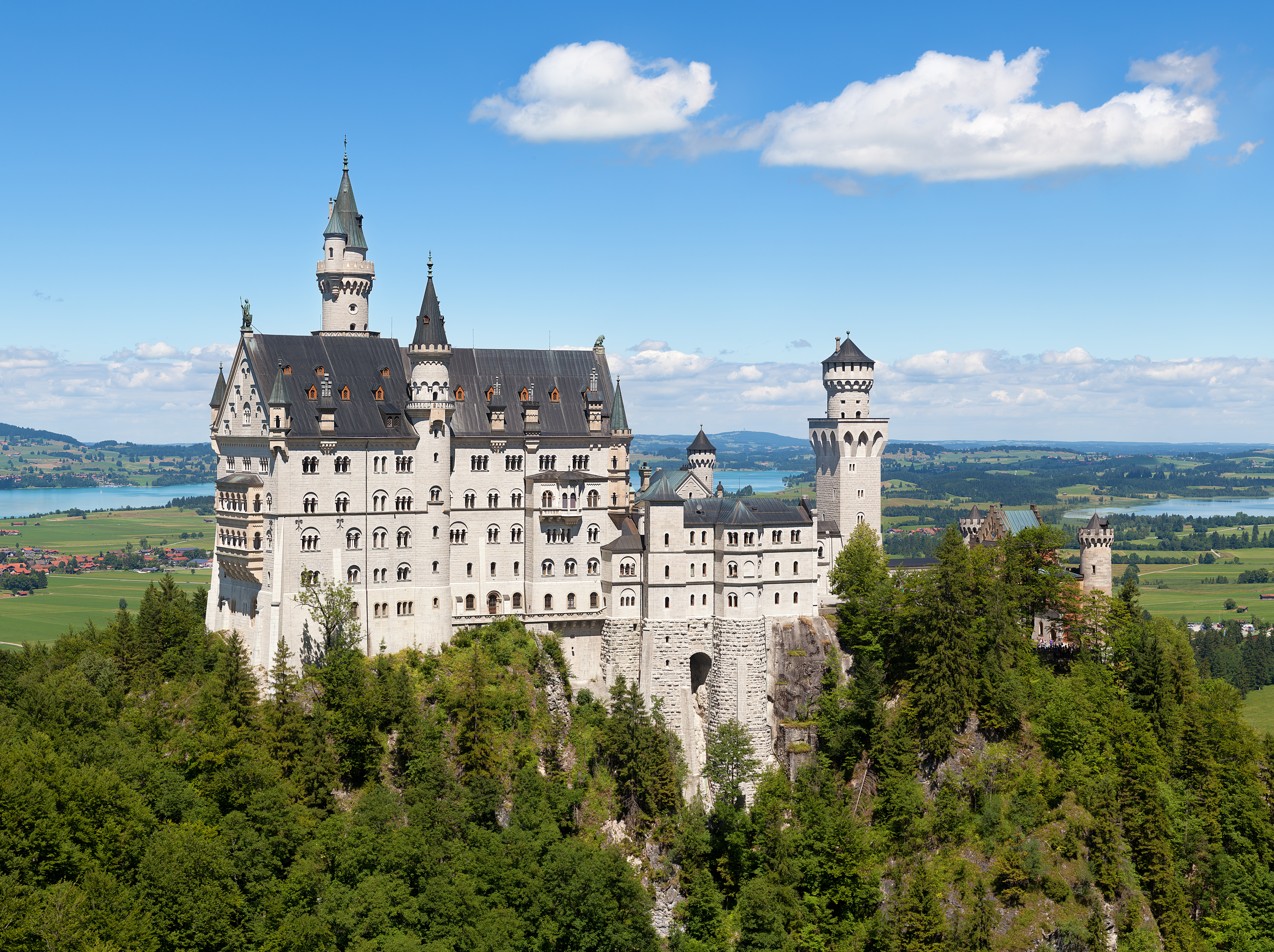
Neuschwanstein Castle

- Neuschwanstein Castle, (Note: First so-called only in 1891.) or New Swan Stone Castle, a dramatic Romanesque fortress with Byzantine, Romanesque, and Gothic interiors, which was built high above his father's castle: Hohenschwangau. Numerous wall paintings depict scenes from the legends Wagner used in his operas. Christian glory and chaste love figure predominantly in the iconography and may have been intended to help Ludwig live up to his religious ideals, but the bedroom decoration depicts the illicit love of Tristan and Isolde (after Gottfried von Strassburg's poem). The castle was not finished at Ludwig's death; the Kemenate was completed in 1892, but the watch-tower and chapel were only at the foundation stage in 1886 and were never built. The residence quarters of the king, which he first occupied in May 1884, can be visited along with the servant's rooms, the kitchens, and the monumental throne room. The throne was never completed, although sketches show how it might have looked on completion. Neuschwanstein Castle is a landmark well known by many non-Germans and was used by Walt Disney in the 20th century as the inspiration for the Sleeping Beauty Castles and Cinderella Castles at Disney Parks around the world. The castle has had over 50 million visitors since it was opened to the public on 1 August 1886, including 1.3 million in 2008 alone.
- Linderhof Castle, an ornate palace in neo-French Rococo style, with handsome formal gardens. Just north of the palace, at the foot of the Hennenkopf, the park contains a Venus grotto where Ludwig was rowed in a shell-like boat on an underground lake lit with red, green or "Capri" blue effects by electricity, a novelty at that time, provided by one of the first generating plants in Bavaria. Stories of private musical performances here are probably apocryphal; nothing is known for certain. In the forest nearby, a Romantic wooded hut was also built around an artificial tree. Inside the palace, iconography reflects Ludwig's fascination with the absolutist government of the Ancien Régime. Ludwig saw himself as the "Moon King", a Romantic shadow of the earlier "Sun King", Louis XIV of France. From Linderhof, Ludwig enjoyed moonlit sleigh rides in an elaborate eighteenth-century sleigh, complete with footmen in 18th-century livery. He was known to stop and visit with rural peasants while on rides, adding to his legend and popularity. The sleigh can today be viewed with other royal carriages and sleds at the Carriage Museum (Marstallmusem) at Nymphenburg Palace in Munich. Its lantern was illuminated by electricity supplied by a battery. There is also a Moorish Pavilion in the park of Schloß Linderhof.

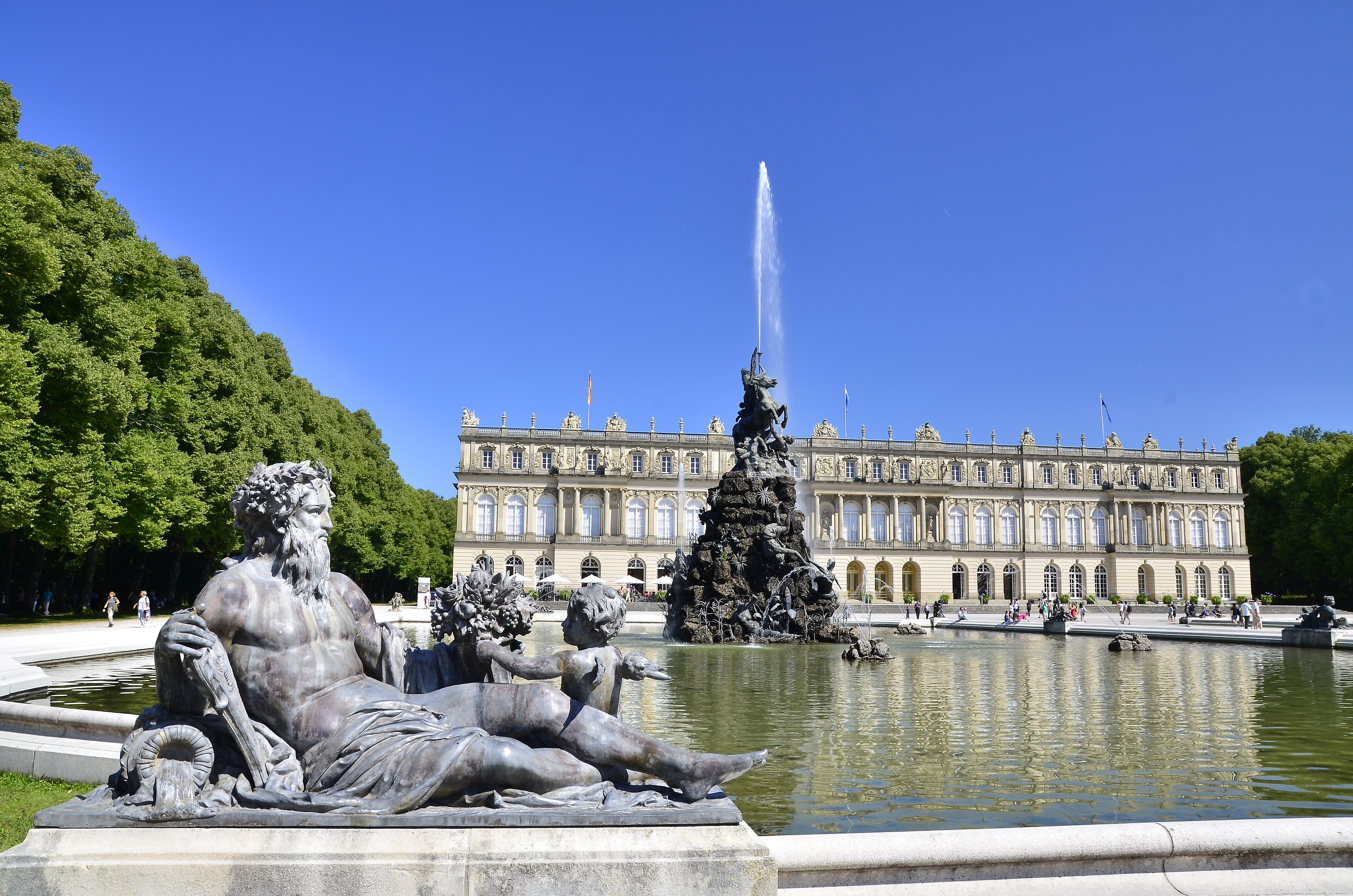
Herrenchiemsee

- Herrenchiemsee, a replica (although only the central section was ever built) of Louis XIV's Palace of Versailles, which was meant to outdo its predecessor in scale and opulence – for instance, at 98 meters the Hall of Mirrors and its adjoining Halls of War and Peace is slightly longer than the original. The palace is located on the Herren Island in the middle of the Chiemsee lake. Most of the palace was never completed once the king ran out of money, and Ludwig lived there for only 10 days in October 1885, less than a year before his mysterious death. Tourists come from France to view the recreation of the famous Ambassadors' Staircase. The original Ambassadors' Staircase at Versailles was demolished in 1752.
- Ludwig outfitted King's House on Schachen with an overwhelmingly decorative Oriental style interior, including a replica of the famous Peacock Throne.
- The Bayreuth Festspielhaus was built for and under the supervision of Richard Wagner, with funding provided by King Ludwig, as a showcase for Wagner's operas.
- Falkenstein, a planned but never executed "robber baron's castle" in the Gothic style. A painting by Christian Jank shows the proposed building as an even more fairytale version of Neuschwanstein, perched on a rocky cliff high above Castle Neuschwanstein.

Ludwig II left behind a large collection of plans and designs for other castles that were never built, as well as plans for further rooms in his completed buildings. Many of these designs are housed today in the King Ludwig II Museum at Herrenchiemsee Castle. These building designs date from the latter part of Ludwig's reign, beginning around 1883. As money was starting to run out, the artists knew that their designs would never be executed. The designs became more extravagant and numerous as the artists realized that there was no need to concern themselves with economy or practicality.

=== Arts ===
Ludwig II with Richard Wagner at the piano

It has been said that Richard Wagner's late career is part of Ludwig's legacy, since he almost certainly would have been unable to complete his opera cycle Der Ring des Nibelungen or to write his final opera, Parsifal, without the king's support. Ludwig also sponsored the premieres of Tristan und Isolde, Die Meistersinger von Nürnberg, and, through his financial support of the Bayreuth Festival, those of Der Ring des Nibelungen and Parsifal. Ludwig provided Munich with its opera house, Staatstheater am Gärtnerplatz, establishing a lasting tradition of comic and romantic musical theatre known as Singspiele as well as operettas produced for the Bavarian public.

=== Cultural references ===
As the "Swan King", Ludwig is said to have inspired the story behind the classical ballet Swan Lake by Russian composer Pyotr Ilyich Tchaikovsky. This could be referenced to the days of his childhood when he spent much of his youth in a castle named Hohenschwangau ('high region of the swan') in the Bavarian Alps. Ludwig grew up there among swan images and icons, and the nearby Schwansee ('Swan Lake').

Film portrayals of Ludwig include the German productions Ludwig II (1955), directed by Helmut Käutner, and Ludwig: Requiem for a Virgin King (1972), directed by Hans-Jürgen Syberberg, as well as Italian director Luchino Visconti's Ludwig (1973). He also appears as a character in an American biographical film of Wagner, Magic Fire (1955), directed by William Dieterle, and in Wagner (1983), a British television miniseries directed by Tony Palmer. The plot of the 1995 computer mystery game The Beast Within: A Gabriel Knight Mystery is centered on Ludwig II and Richard Wagner.

Historical novels presenting the reign and death of Ludwig include Clarissa Lohde's Alone in the Purple: A Story of the Last Days of King Ludwig of Bavaria (1912), and David Stacton's Remember Me (Faber, 1957). Ludwig and his legacy are also relevant to the plots of The Ludwig Conspiracy by Oliver Potszch, and Steve Berry's The Last Kingdom. The 2010 thriller novel The Secret Crown by Chris Kuzneski is based on the antics of Ludwig II, weaving fiction with known facts about the monarch.

Three board games, Castles of Mad King Ludwig (2014), The Palace of Mad King Ludwig (2017), and Between Two Castles of Mad King Ludwig (2018), are named for Ludwig II and inspired by his penchant for elaborate and whimsical castles; Neuschwanstein Castle is pictured on the box of Castles. The 2022 collector's edition of the game features a Towers expansion that incorporates new tiles and miniatures based on eight of the king's castles. All three games were designed by Ted Alspach.

On 15 March 2023, Ludwig II was included as downloadable content in the turn-based strategy video game Civilization VI. When playing as Ludwig, the player is incentivised to build as many great architectural and cultural feats as they can, to mirror his legacy of lavish projects and patronage.

== Honours and arms ==
Coat of arms of Ludwig II as the King of Bavaria

=== National ===
- Knight of the Order of St. Hubert

=== Foreign ===
- Austrian Empire:
  - Knight of the Order of the Golden Fleece, 1864
  - Grand Cross of the Order of St. Stephen, 1868
- Baden:
  - Knight of the House Order of Fidelity, 1864
  - Grand Cross of the Order of the Zähringer Lion, 1864
- Ernestine duchies: Grand Cross of the Saxe-Ernestine House Order, September 1865
- France: Grand Cross of the Legion of Honour, August 1867
- Hawaii: Grand Cross of the Royal Order of Kamehameha I, 1865
- Hesse: Grand Cross of the Ludwig Order, 7 September 1863
- Italy: Knight of the Order of the Annunciation, 31 May 1869
- Mexican Empire: Grand Cross of the Order of the Mexican Eagle, with Collar, 1865
- Oldenburg: Grand Cross with Golden Crown of the House and Merit Order of Peter Frederick Louis, 4 November 1862
- Prussia: Knight of the Order of the Black Eagle, 24 August 1863; with Collar, 1872
- Russia: Knight of the Order of St. Andrew, September 1863
- Saxe-Weimar-Eisenach: Grand Cross of the Order of the White Falcon, 14 September 1864
- Saxony: Knight of the Order of the Rue Crown, 1864
- Spain: Grand Cross of the Order of Charles III, with Collar, 5 April 1864
- Sweden-Norway: Knight of the Order of the Seraphim, 9 April 1864
- Württemberg: Grand Cross of the Order of the Württemberg Crown, 1864

== Notes ==
Ludwig II of Bavaria House of Wittelsbach Born: 25 August 1845 Died: 13 June 1886
Regnal titles
Preceded by Maximilian II	King of Bavaria; 1864–1886	Succeeded by Otto
