= Politics of Bavaria =

Bavaria, one of the states of Germany, has a multiparty system dominated by the Christian Social Union in Bavaria (CSU). Bavaria has long been a bastion of conservative politics in Germany, with the Christian Social Union having won every election of the state parliament since 1946 and having a near monopoly on power. Every Bavarian Minister-President since 1957 has been a member of this party.

On the other hand the bigger and more liberal, or rather social democratic, cities, especially Munich, have been governed for decades by the Social Democratic Party of Germany (SPD) until recently the second biggest party. In 2018 the Alliance 90/The Greens which have been represented in the state parliament since 1986, became the second biggest political party in the Landtag and in 2020 the biggest party in the Munich City Council. From the historical point of view, older Bavaria was one of the most liberal, predominantly Roman Catholic states until the rather rural areas of Swabia and Franconia were added in 1814/15 at the Congress of Vienna.

In 1995 the Bavarians decided to introduce direct democracy on the local level in a referendum. This was initiated bottom-up by an association called Mehr Demokratie (More Democracy). This is a grass-roots organization which campaigns for the right to citizen-initiated referendums. In 1997 the Bavarian Supreme Court aggravated the regulations considerably (e.g. by introducing a turn-out quorum). Nevertheless, Bavaria has the most advanced regulations on local direct democracy in Germany. This has led to a spirited citizens’ participation in communal and municipal affairs – 835 referendums took place from 1995 through 2005.

== Constitution ==
The Constitution of Bavaria was enacted on 8 December 1946. It is the fourth constitutional document in Bavarian history after the Constitution of 1808, the Constitution of the Kingdom of Bavaria in 1818 and the Bamberg Constitution of 1919.

== Landtag of Bavaria ==
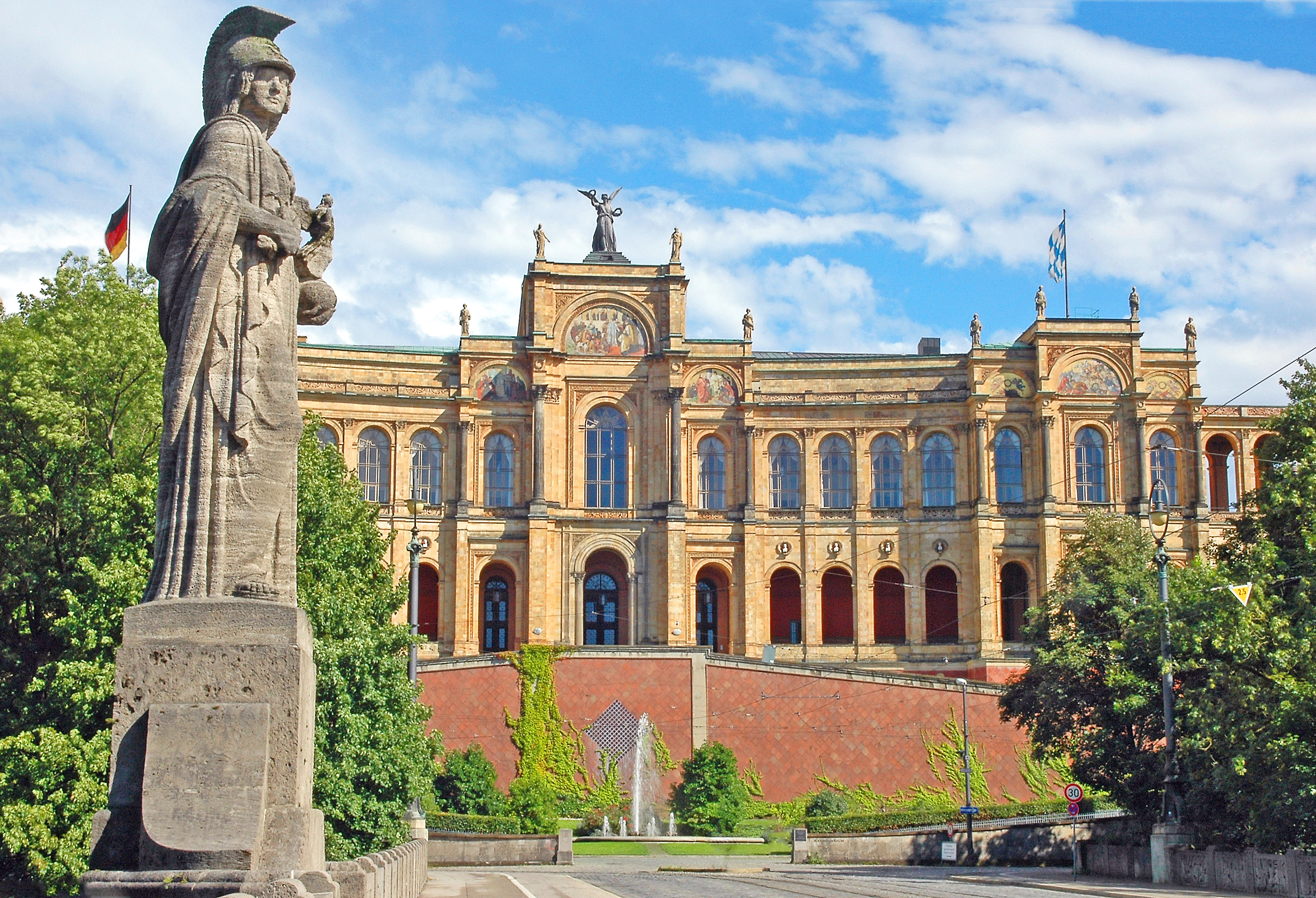
Maximilianeum, seat of the Landtag of Bavaria

Bavaria has a unicameral Landtag, or state parliament. The 180 members of the Landtag (plus additional overhang and leveling seats) are elected for a period of five years by universal suffrage. The Landtag may dissolve itself with a majority vote of its legal number of members or be dissolved by means of a state-wide referendum.

Until December 1999, there was also a Senat, or Senate, whose members were chosen by social and economic groups in Bavaria, but following a referendum in 1998, this institution was abolished.

The Landtag resides in the Maximilianeum, a building rich in tradition built on the banks of River Isar by King Maximilian II in the 19th century.

=== Electoral system ===
Constituencies and single member districts for the Bavarian state election, 2018

Bavaria uses mixed-member proportional representation to elect its members of the Landtag. Party representation is not apportioned statewide, the distribution of seats takes place separately within the seven administrative districts (Regierungsbezirke), which are referred to in the constitution as constituencies (Wahlkreise). The constituencies are divided into electoral districts (Stimmkreise) in which one member is directly elected. The number of single member districts is about half the number of seats in the constituency.

Since the 2018 state election seats and single member districts are distributed as follows:

Constituency	Seats (Note: Without overhang and leveling seats)	Single member districts
Upper Bavaria	61	31
Lower Bavaria	18	9
Upper Palatinate	16	8
Upper Franconia	16	8
Middle Franconia	24	12
Lower Franconia	19	10
Swabia	26	13
Total	180	91

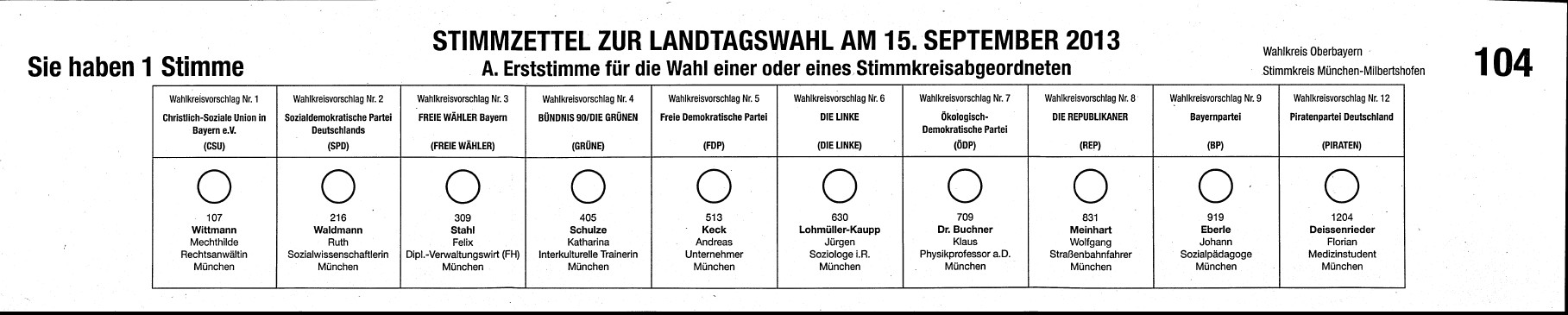
Ballot paper for the first vote in district 104 (Munich Milbertshofen) of the Upper Bavaria constituency

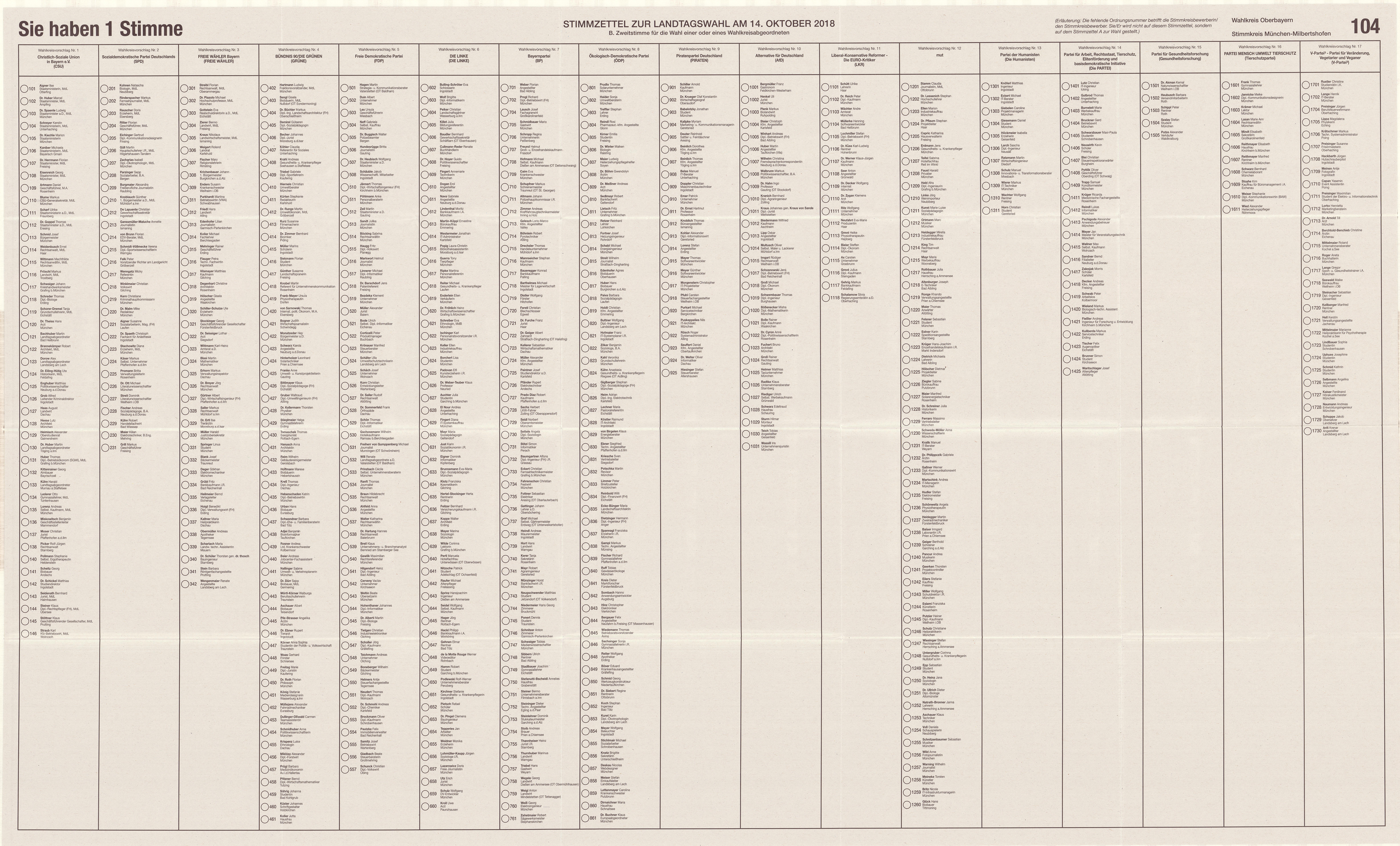
Ballot paper for the second vote in district 104 (Munich Milbertshofen) of the Upper Bavaria constituency

Since the 1950 state election every elector has two votes, one for a candidate in their electoral district and one for a candidate in their constituency. All district (local) candidates are also constituency (regional) candidates with their parties. The parties may also nominate constituency-only candidates. To prevent double voting, the constituency ballots in each district omit the candidates running in that district. Members in single-member districts are elected by first-past-the-post, based just on the first (district) votes. The distribution of seats in the constituencies are made by proportional representation which takes into account the parties' aggregate first (district) votes combined with their second (constituency) votes. Seats are allocated using the Hare-Niemeyer method, after in 1992 the Bavarian Constitutional Court ruled the use of the D'Hondt method in state elections unconstitutional. To compensate if a party wins more electoral district seats in a constituency than its votes would entitle it to (these extra seats are termed overhang seats), the other parties receive leveling seats in the constituency too, increasing the number of seats for the constituency. There is no statewide adjustment of the seats. Only Parties and groups of voters who obtain at least 5% of the total votes (sum of first and second votes) in Bavaria participate in the distribution of seats. This threshold also applies to winning single-member districts; a party will forfeit all its district seats that it won if the party did not meet the 5% statewide threshold, with the forfeited district seats going to the second-place candidate.

Bavaria uses an open-list system for the constituency seats. For the distribution of list seats, a candidate is ranked within the list by the number of first votes received within the district plus the number of second votes received from voters elsewhere in the constituency. In this manner, voters collectively produce a list that is different from what the party submitted, which can result in the defeat of candidates that would have been elected (and vice versa) had the election taken place under a closed-list system.

=== Next election ===
According to the Bavarian Constitution, the election must be held on a Sunday "at the earliest 59 months, at the latest 62 months" after the preceding state elections unless the Landtag is dissolved, in this case the new election shall be held at the latest on the sixth Sunday after the dissolution. The elections since 1978 have always taken place between mid-September and mid-October. The next election is expected to take place in 2028.

=== Past elections ===
The state election was held on 8 October 2023. The CSU formed a government again with the Free Voters of Bavaria.

The state election was held on 14 October 2018. The CSU lost its majority with a worse result than in 2008. The CSU formed a government with the Free Voters of Bavaria.

The state election was held on 15 September 2013. The CSU won an absolute majority of the seats in the Landtag, while the FDP, a coalition party in the outgoing Bavarian government, did not receive enough votes to enter the new parliament.

The state election was held on 28 September 2008. The CSU had its worst result since the Adenauer era, and lost its majority in the Landtag for the first time in 46 years.

The state election was held on 21 September 2003. The CSU won more than two-thirds of the seats in the Landtag. No party in post-war German history had achieved this before.

=== Party strength in the Landtag ===
Election year	Total seats	Seats won									
Election year	Total seats	CSU	SPD	FDP	BP	BHE	Grüne	FW	AfD	WAV	NDP
1946	180	104	54	9						13	
1950	204	64	63	12	39	26					
1954	204	83	61	13	28	19					
1958	204	101	64	8	14	17					
1962	204	108	79	9	8						
1966	204	110	79								15
1970	204	124	70	10							
1974	204	132	64	8							
1978	204	129	65	10							
1982	204	133	71								
1986	204	128	61				15				
1990	204	127	58	7			12				
1994	204	120	70				14				
1998	204	123	67				14				
2003	180	124	41				15				
2008	187	92	39	16			19	21			
2013	180	101	42				18	19			
2018	205	85	22	11			38	27	22		
2023	203	85	17				32	37	32		

=== Legislative compositions ===
11th Landtag, following 1986 election

12th Landtag, following 1990 election

13th Landtag, following 1994 election

14th Landtag, following 1998 election

15th Landtag, following 2003 election

16th Landtag, following 2008 election

17th Landtag, following 2013 election

18th Landtag, following 2018 election

19th Landtag, following 2023 election

=== State election results maps ===
1950 Bavarian state election, Black is CSU, Red is SPD, Light blue is Bavaria Party

1954 Bavarian state election, Black is CSU, Red is SPD, Light blue is Bavaria Party

1958 Bavarian state election, Black is CSU, Red is SPD, Light blue is Bavaria Party

1986 Bavarian state election, Black is CSU, Red is SPD

1990 Bavarian state election, Black is CSU, Red is SPD

1994 Bavarian state election, Black is CSU, Red is SPD

1998 Bavarian state election, Black is CSU, Red is SPD

2003 Bavarian state election, Black is CSU, Red is SPD

2008 Bavarian state election, Black is CSU, Red is SPD

2013 Bavarian state election, Black is CSU, Red is SPD

2018 Bavarian state election, Black is CSU, Red is SPD

2023 Bavarian state election, Black is CSU, AfD is Blue

=== Constituencies in the Landtag ===
Upper Bavaria

- Munich-Hadern (101)
- Munich-Bogenhausen (102)
- Munich-Giesing (103)
- Munich-Milbertshofen (104)
- Munich-Moosach (105)
- Munich-Pasing (106)
- Munich-Ramersdorf (107)
- Munich-Schwabing (108)
- Munich-Mitte (109)
- Altötting (110)
- Bad Tölz-Wolfratshausen, Garmisch-Partenkirchen (111)
- Berchtesgadner Land (112)
- Dachau (113)
- Ebersberg (114)
- Eichstätt (115)
- Erding (116)
- Freising (117)
- Fürstenfeldbruck-Ost (118)
- Ingolstadt (119)
- Landsberg am Lech, Fürstenfeldbruck-West (120)
- Miesbach (121)
- Mühldorf am Inn (122)
- München-Land-Nord (123)
- München-Land-Süd (124)
- Neuburg-Schrobenhausen (125)
- Pfaffenhofen an der Ilm (126)
- Rosenheim-Ost (127)
- Rosenheim-West (128)
- Starnberg (129)
- Traunstein (130)
- Weilheim-Schongau (131)

Lower Bavaria

- Deggendorf (201)
- Dingolfing (202)
- Kelheim (203)
- Landshut (204)
- Passau-Ost (205)
- Passau-West (206)
- Regen, Freyung Grafenau (207)
- Rottal-Inn (208)
- Straubing (209)

Upper Palatinate

- Amberg-Sulzbach (301)
- Cham (302)
- Neumarkt in der Oberpfalz (303)
- Regensburg-Land (304)
- Regensburg-Stadt (305)
- Schwandorf (306)
- Tirschenreuth (307)
- Weiden in der Oberpfalz (308)

Upper Franconia

- Bamberg-Land (401)
- Bamberg-Stadt (402)
- Beyreuth (403)
- Coburg (404)
- Forchheim (405)
- Hof (406)
- Kronach, Lichtenfels (407)
- Wunsiedel, Kulmbach (408)

Middle Franconia

- Nuremberg-North (501)
- Nürnberg-Ost (502)
- Nürnberg-Süd (503)
- Nürnberg-West (504)
- Ansbach-Nord (505)
- Ansbach-Süd, Weißenburg-Gunzenhausen (506)
- Erlangen-Höchstadt (507)
- Erlangen-Stadt (508)
- Fürth (509)
- Neustadt an der Aisch-Bad Windsheim, Fürth-Land (510)
- Nürnberger Land (511)
- Roth (512)

Lower Franconia

- Aschaffenburg-Ost (601)
- Aschaffenburg-West (602)
- Bad Kissingen (603)
- Haßberge, Rhön-Grabfeld (604)
- Kitzingen (605)
- Main-Spessart (606)
- Miltenberg (607)
- Schweinfurt (608)
- Würzburg-Land (609)
- Würzburg-Stadt (610)

Swabia

- Augsburg-Stadt-Ost (701)
- Augsburg-Stadt-West (702)
- Aichach-Friedberg (703)
- Augsburg-Land, Dillingen (704)
- Augsburg-Land-Süd (705)
- Donau-Ries (706)
- Günzburg (707)
- Kaufbeuren (708)
- Kempten, Oberallgäu (709)
- Lindau, Sonthofen (710)
- Marktoberdorf (711)
- Memmingen (712)
- Neu-Ulm (713)

== State government ==
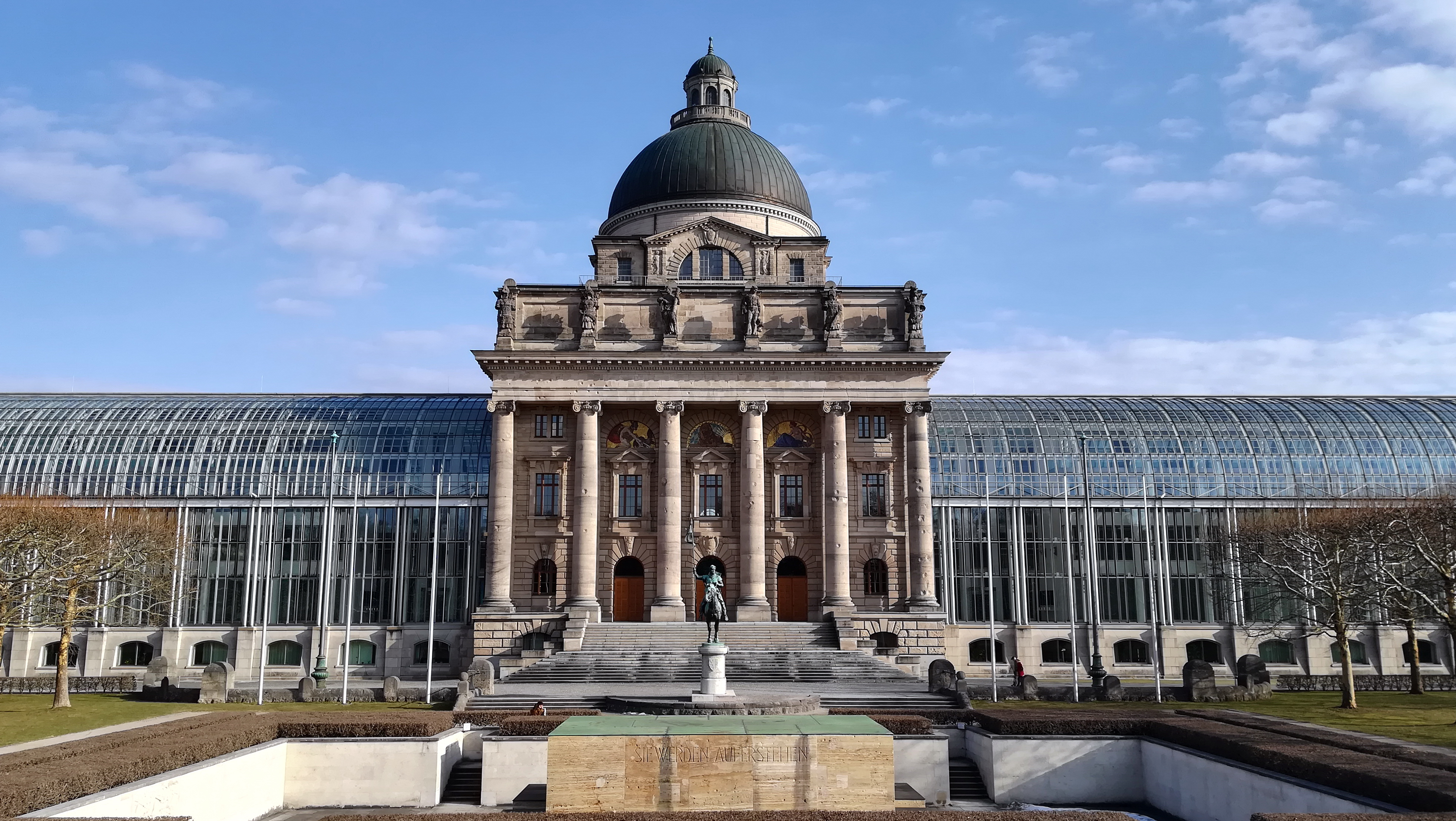
Bavarian State Chancellery

- Bavaria Cabinet since 12 November 2018

The Bavarian state government is the supreme executive authority of the state. It consists of the minister-president of Bavaria and up to 17 state ministers and state secretaries. The minister-president as head of government is elected for a period of five years by the Landtag. With the approval of the Landtag he appoints and dismiss the members of the state government.

The state government is composed of the:

- State Chancellery (Staatskanzlei)
- Ministry of the Interior, for Sport and Integration (Staatsministerium des Innern, für Sport und Integration)
- Ministry for Housing, Construction and Transport (Staatsministerium für Wohnen, Bau und Verkehr)
- Ministry of Justice (Staatsministerium der Justiz)
- Ministry for Education and Culture (Staatsministerium für Bildung und Kultus)
- Ministry for Science and Art (Staatsministerium für Wissenschaft und Kunst)
- Ministry of Finance and for Home Affairs (Staatsministerium der Finanzen und für Heimat)
- Ministry for Economic Affairs, Regional Development and Energy (Staatsministerium für Wirtschaft, Landesentwicklung und Energie)
- Ministry for Environment and Consumer Protection (Staatsministerium für Umwelt und Verbraucherschutz)
- Ministry for Food, Agriculture and Forestry (Staatsministerium für Ernährung, Landwirtschaft und Forsten)
- Ministry for Family, Labour and Social Affairs (Staatsministerium für Familie, Arbeit und Soziales)
- Ministry for Health and Care (Staatsministerium für Gesundheit und Pflege)
- Ministry for Digital Affairs (Staatsministerium für Digitales)

=== List of minister-presidents of Bavaria ===
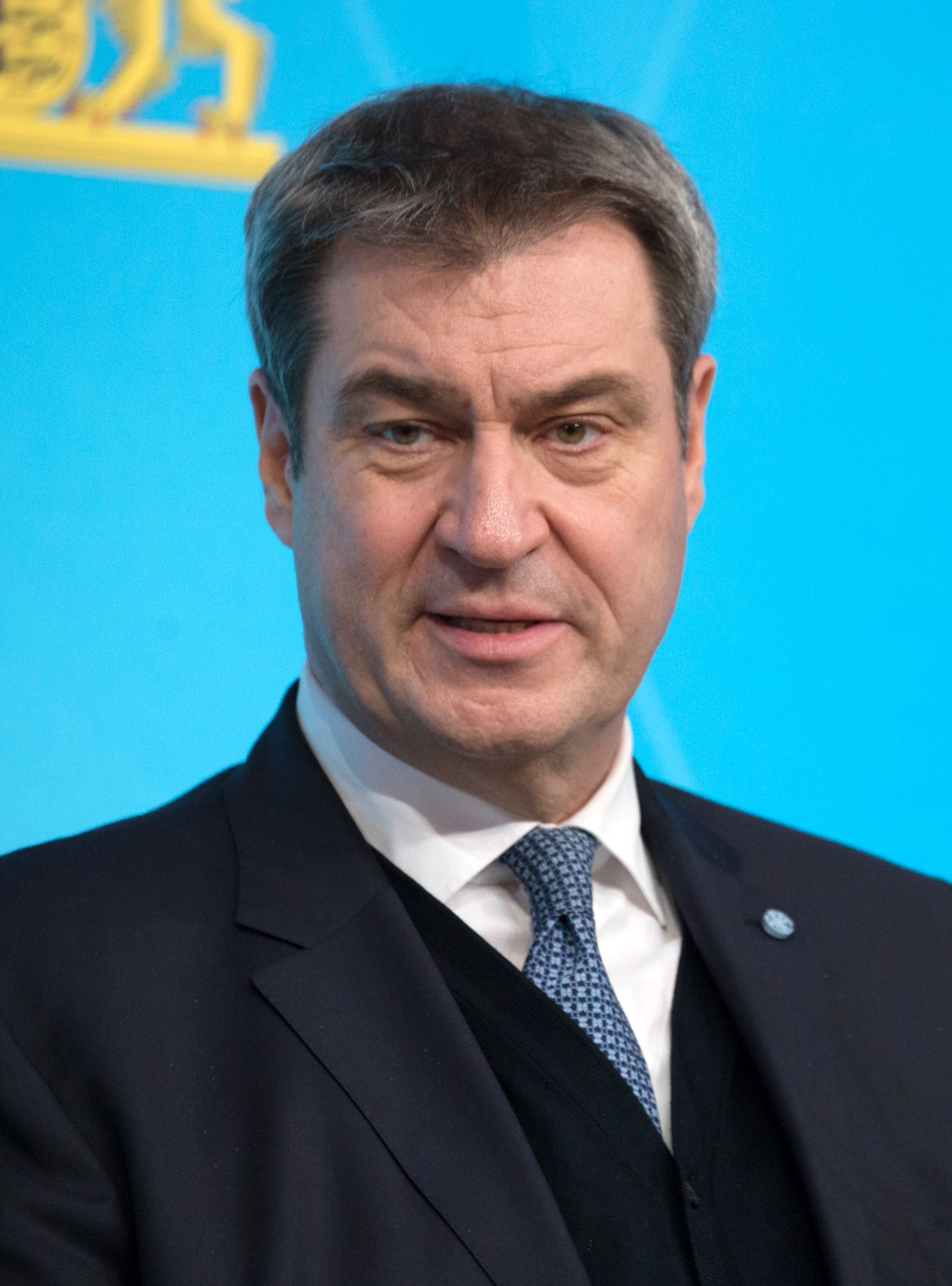
Markus Söder, incumbent minister-president

1. 1945: Fritz Schäffer (CSU)
2. 1945 - 1946: Wilhelm Hoegner (SPD)
3. 1946 - 1954: Hans Ehard (CSU)
4. 1954 - 1957: Wilhelm Hoegner (SPD)
5. 1957 - 1960: Hanns Seidel (CSU)
6. 1960 - 1962: Hans Ehard (CSU)
7. 1962 - 1978: Alfons Goppel (CSU)
8. 1978 - 1988: Franz Josef Strauss (CSU)
9. 1988 - 1993: Max Streibl (CSU)
10. 1993 - 2007: Edmund Stoiber (CSU)
11. 2007 - 2008: Günther Beckstein (CSU)
12. 2008 - 2018: Horst Seehofer (CSU)
13. Since 2018: Markus Söder (CSU)

== See also ==
- Bavarian Patriotic Party
- Monarchism in Bavaria after 1918
