= Elections in Germany =

Several articles in several parts of the Basic Law for the Federal Republic of Germany govern elections and establish constitutional requirements such as the secret ballot, and the requirement that all elections be conducted in a free and fair manner. The Basic Law also requires that the federal legislature enact detailed federal laws to govern elections; electoral law(s). One such article is Article 38, regarding the election of deputies in the federal Bundestag. Article 38.2 of the Basic Law establishes universal suffrage: "Any person who has attained the age of eighteen shall be entitled to vote; any person who has attained the age of majority shall be eligible for election."

German federal elections are for all members of the Bundestag, which in turn determines who is the chancellor of Germany. The most recent federal election was held on 23 February 2025. The President of Germany is not elected directly by voters, but indirectly by electors send from the state parliaments and the Bundestag.

== Latest election ==
Party	Party-list			Constituency			Total seats
Party	Votes	%	Seats	Votes	%	Seats	Total seats
Christian Democratic Union of Germany	11,196,374	22.55	36	12,604,184	25.46	128	164
Alternative for Germany	10,328,780	20.80	110	10,177,318	20.56	42	152
Social Democratic Party of Germany	8,149,124	16.41	76	9,936,433	20.07	44	120
Alliance 90/The Greens	5,762,380	11.61	73	5,443,393	11.00	12	85
The Left (Germany)	4,356,532	8.77	58	3,933,297	7.95	6	64
Christian Social Union in Bavaria	2,964,028	5.97	0	3,272,064	6.61	44	44
Sahra Wagenknecht Alliance	2,472,947	4.98	0	299,401	0.60	0	0
Free Democratic Party (Germany)	2,148,757	4.33	0	1,622,912	3.28	0	0
Free Voters	769,279	1.55	0	1,254,565	2.53	0	0
Human Environment Animal Protection Party	482,201	0.97	0	82,498	0.17	0	0
Volt Germany	355,262	0.72	0	391,666	0.79	0	0
Die PARTEI	242,741	0.49	0	122,268	0.25	0	0
Grassroots Democratic Party of Germany	85,373	0.17	0	41,923	0.08	0	0
Bündnis Deutschland	76,372	0.15	0	87,955	0.18	0	0
South Schleswig Voters' Association	76,138	0.15	1	58,779	0.12	0	1
Ecological Democratic Party	49,764	0.10	0	54,606	0.11	0	0
Team Todenhöfer	24,553	0.05	0	9,783	0.02	0	0
Party of Progress (Germany)	21,388	0.04	0	1,282	0.00	0	0
Marxist–Leninist Party of Germany	19,551	0.04	0	24,218	0.05	0	0
Party of Humanists	14,294	0.03	0	1,871	0.00	0	0
Pirate Party Germany	13,800	0.03	0	2,151	0.00	0	0
Bavaria Party	12,278	0.02	0	5,763	0.01	0	0
Alliance C – Christians for Germany	11,768	0.02	0	2,021	0.00	0	0
MERA25	6,994	0.01	0	658	0.00	0	0
Values Union	6,736	0.01	0	2,849	0.01	0	0
Human World (political party)	694	0.00	0	0	0.00	0	0
Bürgerrechtsbewegung Solidarität	676	0.00	0	1,295	0.00	0	0
Socialist Equality Party (Germany)	425	0.00	0	73	0.00	0	0
Party for Rejuvenation Research	303	0.00	0	0	0.00	0	0
Independents	0	0.00	0	70,163	0.14	0	0
Total	49,649,512	100.00	354	49,505,389	100.00	276	630

== Result in history ==
=== 1919 German federal election ===
Party	Votes	%	Seats
Social Democratic Party of Germany	11,509,048	37.86	163
Centre Party (Germany)	5,980,216	19.67	91
German Democratic Party	5,641,825	18.56	75
German National People's Party	3,121,479	10.27	44
Independent Social Democratic Party of Germany	2,317,290	7.62	22
German People's Party	1,345,638	4.43	19
Bavarian Peasants' League	275,125	0.91	4
German-Hanoverian Party	77,226	0.25	1
Schleswig-Holstein Farmers and Farmworkers Democracy	57,913	0.19	1
Brunswick State Electoral Association	56,858	0.19	1
Mecklenburg Village League	10,891	0.04	0
German Peace Party	3,503	0.01	0
German Officials', Employees' and Middle Class Party	1,438	0.00	0
Christian Social Party (Germany)	664	0.00	0
Middle Class Party	640	0.00	0
German Social Aristocracy	279	0.00	0
Democratic Middle Class Party	208	0.00	0
Social Reform Party	45	0.00	0
Total	30,400,286	100.00	421

=== November 1933 German parliamentary election ===
Party	Votes	%	Seats
Nazi Party	39,655,224	92.11	661
Against	3,398,249	7.89	0
Total	43,053,473	100.00	661

=== 1949 West German federal election ===
Party	Votes	%	Seats
Social Democratic Party of Germany	6,934,975	29.22	131
Christian Democratic Union of Germany	5,978,636	25.19	115
Free Democratic Party (Germany)	2,829,920	11.92	52
Christian Social Union in Bavaria	1,380,448	5.82	24
Communist Party of Germany	1,361,706	5.74	15
Bavaria Party	986,478	4.16	17
German Party (1947)	939,934	3.96	17
Centre Party (Germany, 1945)	727,505	3.07	10
Economic Reconstruction Union	681,888	2.87	12
Deutsche Rechtspartei	429,031	1.81	5
Radical Social Freedom Party	216,749	0.91	0
South Schleswig Voters' Association	75,388	0.32	1
European People's Movement of Germany	26,162	0.11	0
Rheinish-Westfalian People's Party	21,931	0.09	0
Independents	1,141,647	4.81	3
Total	23,732,398	100.00	402

=== 1949 East German Constitutional Assembly election ===
Party or alliance		Votes	%	Seats
Democratic Bloc (East Germany)	Socialist Unity Party of Germany	7,943,949	66.07	450
Democratic Bloc (East Germany)	Christian Democratic Union (East Germany)	7,943,949	66.07	225
Democratic Bloc (East Germany)	Liberal Democratic Party of Germany	7,943,949	66.07	225
Democratic Bloc (East Germany)	Cooperatives	7,943,949	66.07	100
Democratic Bloc (East Germany)	Democratic Farmers' Party of Germany	7,943,949	66.07	75
Democratic Bloc (East Germany)	National Democratic Party of Germany (East Germany)	7,943,949	66.07	75
Democratic Bloc (East Germany)	Democratic Women's League of Germany	7,943,949	66.07	50
Democratic Bloc (East Germany)	Free German Trade Union Federation	7,943,949	66.07	50
Democratic Bloc (East Germany)	Free German Youth	7,943,949	66.07	50
Democratic Bloc (East Germany)	Cultural Association of the GDR	7,943,949	66.07	50
Democratic Bloc (East Germany)	Peasants Mutual Aid Association	7,943,949	66.07	50
Democratic Bloc (East Germany)	Union of Persecutees of the Nazi Regime	7,943,949	66.07	50
Democratic Bloc (East Germany)	Social Democratic Party in the GDR	7,943,949	66.07	25
Democratic Bloc (East Germany)	Independents	7,943,949	66.07	50
Against		4,080,272	33.93	0
Total		12,024,221	100.00	1,525

== German elections from 1871 to 1945 ==
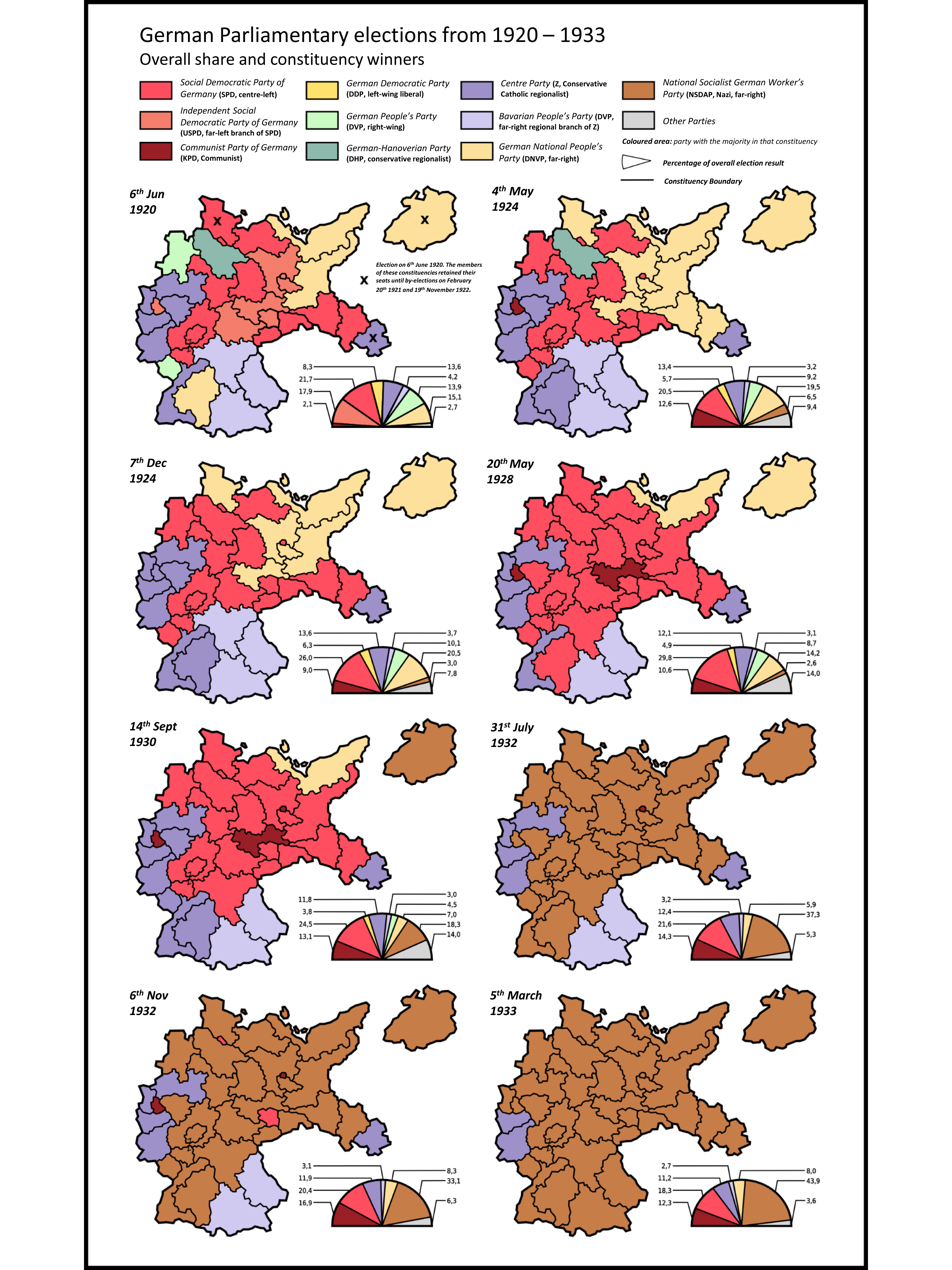
German parliamentary elections, 1920–1933

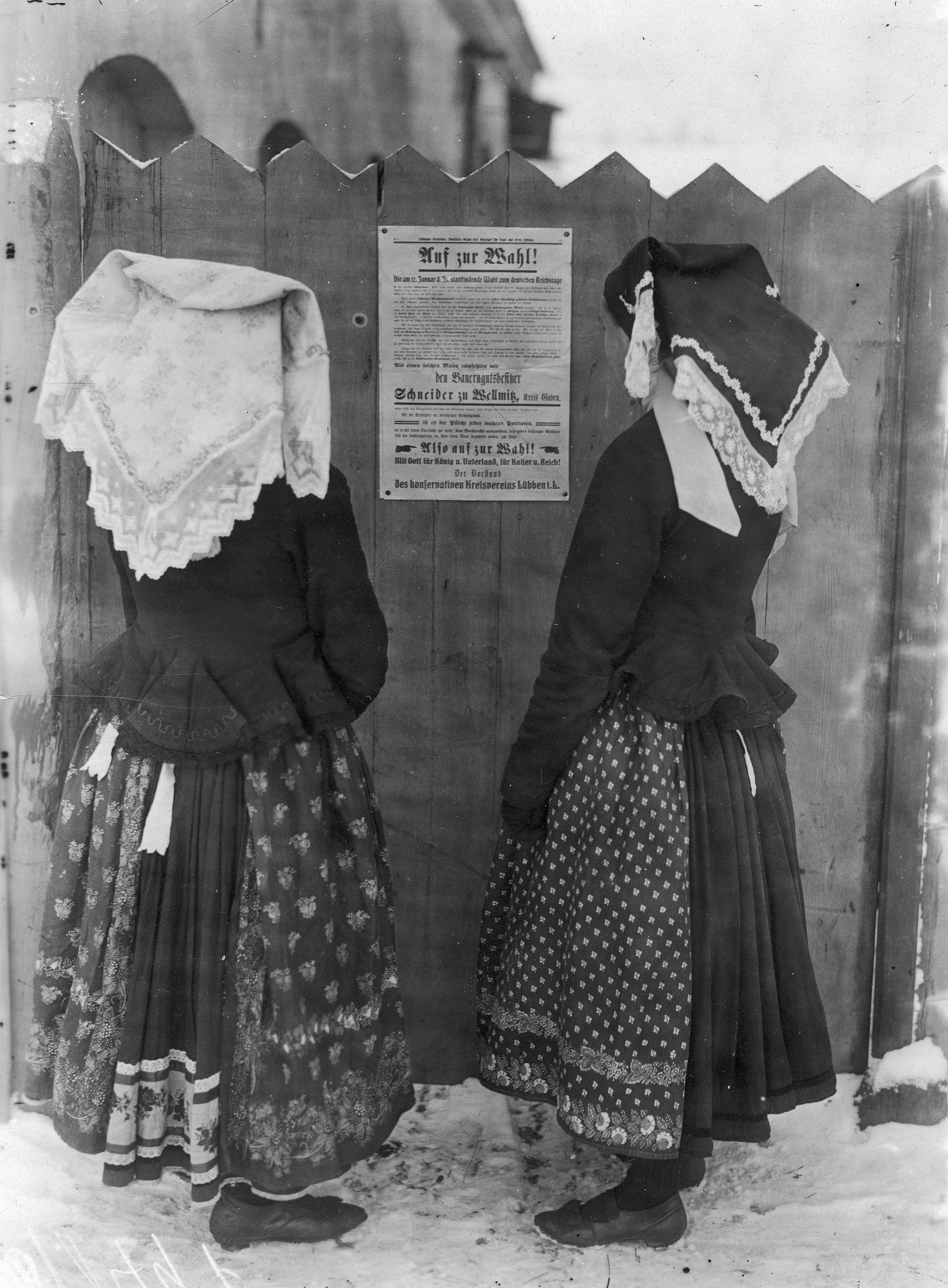
Two women dressed in folk costumes read a Reichstag election poster

After the unification of Germany under Emperor Wilhelm I in 1871, elections were held to the German Reichstag or Imperial Assembly, which supplanted its namesake, the Reichstag of the North German Confederation. The Reichstag could be dissolved by the emperor or, after the abdication of Wilhelm II in 1918, the president of Germany. With the Weimar Republic's Constitution of 1919, the voting system changed from single-member constituencies to proportional representation. The election age was reduced from 25 to 20 years of age. Women's suffrage had already been established by a new electoral law in 1918 following the November Revolution of that year.

Following the Nazi seizure of power in January 1933, another national election was held on 5 March. This was the last competitive election before World War II, although it was neither free nor fair. Violence and intimidation by the Sturmabteilung, Schutzstaffel and Der Stahlhelm had been underway for months against trade-unionists, communists, social democrats, and even centre-right Catholics. On 27 February, just prior to the election, the Reichstag Fire Decree suspended freedom of the press and most civil liberties. Mass arrests followed, including all Communist and several Social Democrat delegates to the Reichstag. 50000 members of the Hilfspolizei (auxiliary Nazi police) "monitored" polling places on election day to further intimidate voters. While the Nazi Party performed better than it had in the elections of November 1932, it still won only 33% of the vote. By placing their rivals in jail and intimidating others not to take their seats, the Nazis went from a plurality to the majority. Just two weeks after the election, the Enabling Act of 1933 effectively gave Hitler dictatorial power. Three more elections were held in Nazi Germany before the war. They all took the form of a one-question referendum, asking voters to approve a predetermined list of candidates composed exclusively of Nazis and nominally independent "guests" of the party.

=== Imperial elections ===
- 1848 German federal election
- February 1867 North German federal election
- August 1867 North German federal election
- 1868 Zollparlament election
- 1871 German federal election
- 1874 German federal election
- 1877 German federal election
- 1878 German federal election
- 1881 German federal election
- 1884 German federal election
- 1887 German federal election
- 1890 German federal election
- 1893 German federal election
- 1898 German federal election
- 1903 German federal election
- 1907 German federal election
- 1912 German federal election

=== Weimar Republic federal elections ===
- 1919 German federal election
- 1920 German federal election
- May 1924 German federal election
- December 1924 German federal election
- 1928 German federal election
- 1930 German federal election
- July 1932 German federal election
- November 1932 German federal election

=== Weimar Republic presidential elections ===
- 1919 German presidential election
- 1925 German presidential election
- 1932 German presidential election

=== Weimar Republic state elections ===
- Anhalt Landtag elections in the Weimar Republic
- Baden Landtag elections in the Weimar Republic
- Bavarian Landtag elections in the Weimar Republic
- Bremen state elections in the Weimar Republic
- Brunswick Landtag elections in the Weimar Republic
- Hamburg state elections in the Weimar Republic
- Hessian Landtag elections in the Weimar Republic
- Lippe Landtag elections in the Weimar Republic
- Lübeck state elections in the Weimar Republic
- Mecklenburg-Schwerin Landtag elections in the Weimar Republic
- Mecklenburg-Strelitz Landtag elections in the Weimar Republic
- Oldenburg Landtag elections in the Weimar Republic
- Prussian Landtag elections in the Weimar Republic
- Saxony Landtag elections in the Weimar Republic
- Schaumburg-Lippe Landtag elections in the Weimar Republic
- Thuringian Landtag elections in the Weimar Republic
- Waldeck state elections in the Weimar Republic
- Württemberg Landtag elections in the Weimar Republic

=== Elections in Nazi Germany ===
- March 1933 German federal election
- November 1933 German federal election
- 1936 German parliamentary election and referendum
- 1938 German parliamentary election and referendum

== German elections since 1949 ==
=== Federal Republic of Germany ===
==== Electoral system ====
The German political system

Federal elections (Bundestagswahlen) are conducted approximately every four years, resulting from the constitutional requirement for elections to be held 46 to 48 months after the assembly of the Bundestag. Elections can be held earlier in exceptional constitutional circumstances: for example, were the Chancellor to lose a vote of confidence in the Bundestag, then, during a grace period before the Bundestag can vote in a replacement Chancellor, the Chancellor could request the Federal President to dissolve the Bundestag and hold elections. Should the Bundestag be dismissed before the four-year period has ended, elections must be held within 100 days. The exact date of the election is chosen by the President and must be a Sunday or public holiday.

German nationals over the age of 18 who have resided in Germany for at least three months are eligible to vote. Eligibility for candidacy is essentially the same.

The federal legislature in Germany has a one chamber parliament—the Bundestag (Federal Diet); the Bundesrat (Federal Council) represents the States (in particular the state Governments) and is not considered a chamber as its members are not elected. The Bundestag is elected using a personalised proportional system. The Bundestag has 630 members, elected for a four-year term. Less than half, 299 members, are elected in single-member constituencies by first-past-the-post voting, while a further 299 members are allocated from party lists to achieve a proportional distribution in the legislature, in a compensatory way to achieve proportional representation. Voters vote once for a constituency representative, and a second time for a party, and the lists are used to make the party balances match the distribution of second votes.

Germany has a multi-party system with two historically strong political parties and some other third parties also represented in the Bundestag. Since 1990, and including the results of the most recent federal election in 2021, just six main political parties have managed to secure representation in the Bundestag (counting the CDU and CSU as one, and excluding recognised minority group parties such as the SSW which are exempted in federal law from the 5% threshold that is normally required to be breached in order to win party-list seats).

In 2008, some modifications to the electoral system were required under an order of the Federal Constitutional Court. The court had found that a provision in the Federal Election Law made it possible for a party to experience a negative vote weight, thus losing seats due to more votes, and found that this violated the constitutional guarantee of the electoral system being equal and direct.

The court allowed three years to amend the law. Accordingly, the 2009 federal election was allowed to proceed under the previous system. The changes were due by 30 June 2011, but appropriate legislation was not completed by that deadline. A new electoral law was enacted in late 2011, but declared unconstitutional once again by the Federal Constitutional Court upon lawsuits from the opposition parties and a group of some 4,000 private citizens.

Finally, four of the five factions in the Bundestag agreed on an electoral reform whereby the number of seats in the Bundestag will be increased as much as necessary to ensure that any overhang seats are compensated through apportioned leveling seats, to ensure full proportionality according to the political party's share of party votes at the national level. The Bundestag approved and enacted the new electoral reform in February 2013.

==== List of federal election results ====
German parliamentary election results

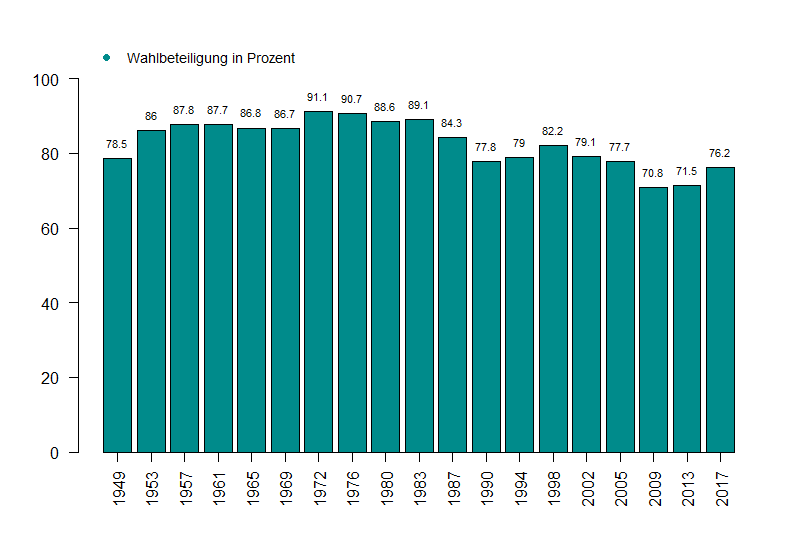
Voter turnout in German federal elections (percentage)

- 1949 West German federal election
- 1953 West German federal election
- 1957 West German federal election
- 1961 West German federal election
- 1965 West German federal election
- 1969 West German federal election
- 1972 West German federal election
- 1976 West German federal election
- 1980 West German federal election
- 1983 West German federal election
- 1987 West German federal election
- 1990 German federal election (1st of the re-united Germany)
- 1994 German federal election
- 1998 German federal election
- 2002 German federal election
- 2005 German federal election
- 2009 German federal election
- 2013 German federal election
- 2017 German federal election
- 2021 German federal election
- 2025 German federal election
1949

1953

1957

1961

1965

1969

1972

1976

1980

1983

1987

1990

1994

1998

2002

2005

2009

2013

2017

2021

2025

=== European elections ===
Every 5 years, Germany, as a founding member of the European Union, votes to select their delegates to the European Parliament. Members of the European Parliament (MEPs) are elected through a proportional party list system, which, unlike federal elections, do not require a minimum threshold to win seats or constituency seats. The voting age has been set at 16 since 2024.

The CDU/CSU has won every EU election since 1979, As of 2024.

- 1979 European Parliament election in West Germany
- 1984 European Parliament election in West Germany
- 1989 European Parliament election in West Germany
- 1994 European Parliament election in Germany
- 1999 European Parliament election in Germany
- 2004 European Parliament election in Germany
- 2009 European Parliament election in Germany
- 2014 European Parliament election in Germany
- 2019 European Parliament election in Germany
- 2024 European Parliament election in Germany
2009

2014

2019

2024

=== Presidential elections ===
Germans do not directly vote for their President. Instead the President is elected every 5 years by the Federal Convention. All members of the Bundestag and an equal number of state delegates elected by the state parliaments specifically for this purpose, proportional to their population, comprise the voters of the convention.

- 1949 West German presidential election
- 1954 West German presidential election
- 1959 West German presidential election
- 1964 West German presidential election
- 1969 West German presidential election
- 1974 West German presidential election
- 1979 West German presidential election
- 1984 West German presidential election
- 1989 West German presidential election
- 1994 German presidential election
- 1999 German presidential election
- 2004 German presidential election
- 2009 German presidential election
- 2010 German presidential election
- 2012 German presidential election
- 2017 German presidential election
- 2022 German presidential election
- 2027 German presidential election

=== State elections in the Federal Republic of Germany ===
State elections are conducted under various rules set by the states. In general they are conducted according to some form of party-list proportional representation, either the same as the federal system or some simplified version. The election period was mostly expanded from four to five years in the last decades, with some states still sticking to four. The dates of elections vary due to various reasons, one of them is having a time window of several weeks or months to pick a Sunday. Sometimes, states with upcoming elections choose the same day, sometimes one picks a different date.

==== Baden-Württemberg state election results ====
- 2001 Baden-Württemberg state election
- 2006 Baden-Württemberg state election
- 2011 Baden-Württemberg state election
- 2016 Baden-Württemberg state election
- 2021 Baden-Württemberg state election
- 2026 Baden-Württemberg state election

==== Bavaria state election results ====
- 1986 Bavarian state election
- 1990 Bavarian state election
- 1994 Bavarian state election
- 1998 Bavarian state election
- 2003 Bavarian state election
- 2008 Bavarian state election
- 2013 Bavarian state election
- 2018 Bavarian state election
- 2023 Bavarian state election
- 2028 Bavarian state election

==== Berlin state election results ====
- 2001 Berlin state election
- 2006 Berlin state election
- 2011 Berlin state election
- 2016 Berlin state election
- 2021 Berlin state election
- 2023 Berlin repeat state election
- 2026 Berlin state election

==== Brandenburg state election results ====
- 1999 Brandenburg state election
- 2004 Brandenburg state election
- 2009 Brandenburg state election
- 2014 Brandenburg state election
- 2019 Brandenburg state election
- 2024 Brandenburg state election
- 2029 Brandenburg state election

==== Bremen state election results ====
- 2003 Bremen state election
- 2007 Bremen state election
- 2011 Bremen state election
- 2015 Bremen state election
- 2019 Bremen state election
- 2023 Bremen state election
- 2027 Bremen state election

==== Hamburg state election results ====
- 2004 Hamburg state election
- 2008 Hamburg state election
- 2011 Hamburg state election
- 2015 Hamburg state election
- 2020 Hamburg state election
- 2025 Hamburg state election

==== Hessian state election results ====
- 1999 Hessian state election
- 2003 Hessian state election
- 2008 Hessian state election
- 2009 Hessian state election
- 2013 Hessian state election
- 2018 Hessian state election
- 2023 Hessian state election
- 2028 Hessian state election

==== Lower Saxony state election results ====
- 1998 Lower Saxony state election
- 2003 Lower Saxony state election
- 2008 Lower Saxony state election
- 2013 Lower Saxony state election
- 2017 Lower Saxony state election
- 2022 Lower Saxony state election
- 2027 Lower Saxony state election

==== Mecklenburg-Vorpommern state election results ====
- 2002 Mecklenburg-Vorpommern state election
- 2006 Mecklenburg-Vorpommern state election
- 2011 Mecklenburg-Vorpommern state election
- 2016 Mecklenburg-Vorpommern state election
- 2021 Mecklenburg-Vorpommern state election
- 2026 Mecklenburg-Vorpommern state election

==== North Rhine-Westphalia state election results ====
- 2000 North Rhine-Westphalia state election
- 2005 North Rhine-Westphalia state election
- 2010 North Rhine-Westphalia state election
- 2012 North Rhine-Westphalia state election
- 2017 North Rhine-Westphalia state election
- 2022 North Rhine-Westphalia state election
- 2027 North Rhine-Westphalia state election

==== Rhineland-Palatinate state election results ====
- 2001 Rhineland-Palatinate state election
- 2006 Rhineland-Palatinate state election
- 2011 Rhineland-Palatinate state election
- 2016 Rhineland-Palatinate state election
- 2021 Rhineland-Palatinate state election
- 2026 Rhineland-Palatinate state election

==== Saarland state election results ====
- 1999 Saarland state election
- 2004 Saarland state election
- 2009 Saarland state election
- 2012 Saarland state election
- 2017 Saarland state election
- 2022 Saarland state election
- 2027 Saarland state election

==== Saxony state election results ====
- 1999 Saxony state election
- 2004 Saxony state election
- 2009 Saxony state election
- 2014 Saxony state election
- 2019 Saxony state election
- 2024 Saxony state election
- 2029 Saxony state election

==== Saxony-Anhalt state election results ====
- 2002 Saxony-Anhalt state election
- 2006 Saxony-Anhalt state election
- 2011 Saxony-Anhalt state election
- 2016 Saxony-Anhalt state election
- 2021 Saxony-Anhalt state election
- 2026 Saxony-Anhalt state election

==== Schleswig-Holstein state election results ====
- 2000 Schleswig-Holstein state election
- 2005 Schleswig-Holstein state election
- 2009 Schleswig-Holstein state election
- 2012 Schleswig-Holstein state election
- 2017 Schleswig-Holstein state election
- 2022 Schleswig-Holstein state election
- 2027 Schleswig-Holstein state election

==== Thuringia state election results ====
- 2004 Thuringian state election
- 2009 Thuringian state election
- 2014 Thuringian state election
- 2019 Thuringian state election
- 2024 Thuringian state election
- 2029 Thuringian state election

=== German Democratic Republic ===
In the German Democratic Republic, elections to the Volkskammer were effectively controlled by the Socialist Unity Party of Germany (SED) and state hierarchy, even though multiple pro forma parties existed. The 18 March 1990 election were the first free ones held in the GDR, producing a government whose major mandate was to negotiate an end to itself and its state.

Prior to the Fall of the Berlin Wall, East Germany did not have free elections. Polling places were under surveillance by the state security apparatuses and the ruling party, the SED, presented voters with a slate of proposed candidates. Voters could optionally enter a booth to strike any candidates the voter did not want; a voter who agreed with the SED's full list simply folded the unmarked ballot in half and placed it into the ballot box. Entering a voting booth was considered suspicious and was noted by the state security apparatuses, which could lead to consequences later for the voter. East German voters commonly referred to the act of voting as "folding" (German: falten). Election outcomes prior to 1990 commonly saw 99% of voters in favor of the suggested slate of candidates. On top of this, the government engaged in electoral fraud and commonly falsified both results and voter turnout percentages, even as late as the May 1989 municipal elections.

- 1949 East German Constitutional Assembly election
- 1950 East German general election
- 1954 East German general election
- 1958 East German general election
- 1963 East German general election
- 1967 East German general election
- 1971 East German general election
- 1976 East German general election
- 1981 East German general election
- 1986 East German general election
- 1990 East German general election (only democratic election)

=== Local elections ===
Local elections in Germany (German: Kommunalwahlen) include elections for most regional and local subdivisions, unless their representatives are appointed or elected by another assembly or office. Such local elections are conducted for representatives in districts, cities, towns, villages and various other administrative regional organizations. In cities and towns local elections usually include voting for a lord mayor or mayor. Smaller villages and settlements may elect a representative (German: Ortsvorsteher) with limited administrative power. Local elections are also often combined with polls about important local matters and questions of general public interest (i.e. the construction of local roads or other infrastructure facilities). While such polls are not legally binding in most cases, their results have considerable influence on local political decisions.

After the Maastricht Treaty of 1992 to strengthen the European integration, Germany and other EU member states implemented legislative changes to grant foreigners of other EU countries the right to vote in local elections in their host country. Foreign EU citizens can vote in elections on district and municipal level in Germany, after the German states adapted their regulations between 1995 and 1998.

== See also ==
- Electoral calendar
- Electoral system
- Electoral system of Germany
- Referendums in Germany
