= Bavaria Party =

Bavaria Party Bayernpartei
- Abbreviation: BP
- Leader: Florian Weber
- Founded: 28 October 1946; 80 years ago
- Preceded by: Bavarian People's Party (de facto)
- Headquarters: Munich, Bavaria
- Youth wing: Young Bavarian Federation
- Membership: 6,000 (2021)
- Ideology: Bavarian nationalism Bavarian independence Regionalism; Christian democracy
- Political position: Right-wing
- European affiliation: European Free Alliance
- Colours: White, Blue
- Bundestag: 0 / 630
- Bundesrat: 0 / 69
- European Parliament: 0 / 96
- Landtag of Bavaria: 0 / 203
- Bezirktags (Bavaria): 4 / 238

Party flag

Website
- bayernpartei.de

The Bavaria Party (German: Bayernpartei, BP) is an autonomist, regionalist, conservative, and economically liberal political party in the state of Bavaria, Germany. The party was founded in 1946, describes itself as patriotic Bavarian and advocates for greater Bavarian autonomy or independence from Germany, while potentially remaining within the European Union. Together with the Christian Social Union (CSU), it can be seen as an heir to the Bavarian People's Party (BVP) which existed prior to the Nazi takeover. The party is a member of the European Free Alliance.

== History ==
The party had some successes at the polls in the late 1940s and 1950s: 20.9% of the votes in Bavaria in 1949 and 17 seats in the German Bundestag and, in 1950, 17.9% and 39 seats in the Bavarian state parliament where in 1954 it formed a coalition with the Bavarian branches of the Social Democratic Party of Germany (SPD) and the Free Democratic Party (FDP). This forced the Christian Social Union (CSU) out of power for three years.

Later, mainly caused by the Casino Affair, which was influenced by the CSU and its general secretary Friedrich Zimmermann, the Bavaria Party rapidly lost voters. It still exists but was last elected to the Bavarian state parliament in 1962.

In the 2008 local elections, however, the party won 50 seats (compared to 32 in 2002), mostly in Upper Bavaria, including one of the 80 seats in the City Council of Munich, the capital of Bavaria, after 42 years of absence there. The Bavaria Party won one seat in the District Parliament of Upper Bavaria.

== Chairman ==
The current chairman of the party is Florian Weber from Bad Aibling in Upper Bavaria.

== Elections ==
In the 2018 elections for the Bavarian Parliament the BP reached 1.7% of the voters' share. In 2013 they had gained 2.1%, the best result for the Bavaria Party since 1966.

After the elections of 2018, the Bavaria Party is represented in three administrative regions of Bavaria:

- Upper Bavaria: 2 seats (2013: 3)
- Lower Bavaria: 1 seat (2013: 1)
- Swabia (Bavaria): 1 seat (2013: 1)

== Election results ==
=== Results from 1946 ===
Year	Bavarian election (Landtag) Total	German election (Bundestag) in Bavaria	European Parliament
2025		0.2%	
2023	0.9%		
2021		0.4%	
2019			0.9%
2018	1.7%		
2017		0.8%	
2014			1.3%
2013	2.1%	0.9%	
2009		0.7%	1.0%
2008	1.1%		
2005		0.5%	
2004			1.0%
2003	0.8%		
2002		0.1%	
1999			0.4%
1998	0.7%	0.4%	
1994	1.0%	0.6%	1.6%
1990	0.8%	0.5%	
1989			0.8%
1987		0.4%	
1986	0.6%		
1984			0.6%
1982	0.5%		
1978	0.4%		
1974	0.8%		
1970	1.3%		
1969		0.9%	
1966	3.4%		
1962	4.8%		
1958	8.1%		
1954	13.2%		
1953		9.2%	
1950	17.9%		
1949		20.9%	

=== Landtag of Bavaria ===
Election year	# of constituency votes	# of party list votes	% of overall votes	# of overall seats won	+/–
1986	41,570	30,237	0.6% ▲	0 / 204	Steady
1990	53,459	40,251	0.8% ▲	0 / 204	Steady
1994	68,802	51,070	1.0% ▲	0 / 204	Steady
1998	47,936	40,644	0.7% ▼	0 / 204	Steady
2003	44,572	32,818	0.8% ▲	0 / 180	Steady
2008	60,815	55,649	1.1% ▲	0 / 187	Steady
2013	137,323	110,177	2.1% ▲	0 / 180	Steady
2018	122,417	109,513	1.7% ▼	0 / 205	Steady
2023	72,325	57,155	0.9% ▼	0 / 203	Steady

== See also ==
- List of political parties in Germany
- List of active separatist movements in Europe
