= 1954 Bavarian state election =

German state election

- 28 November 1954

All 204 seats in the Landtag of Bavaria 103 seats needed for a majority
- Registered: 6,102,799
- Turnout: 5,030,235 (82.4%) ▲2.5%
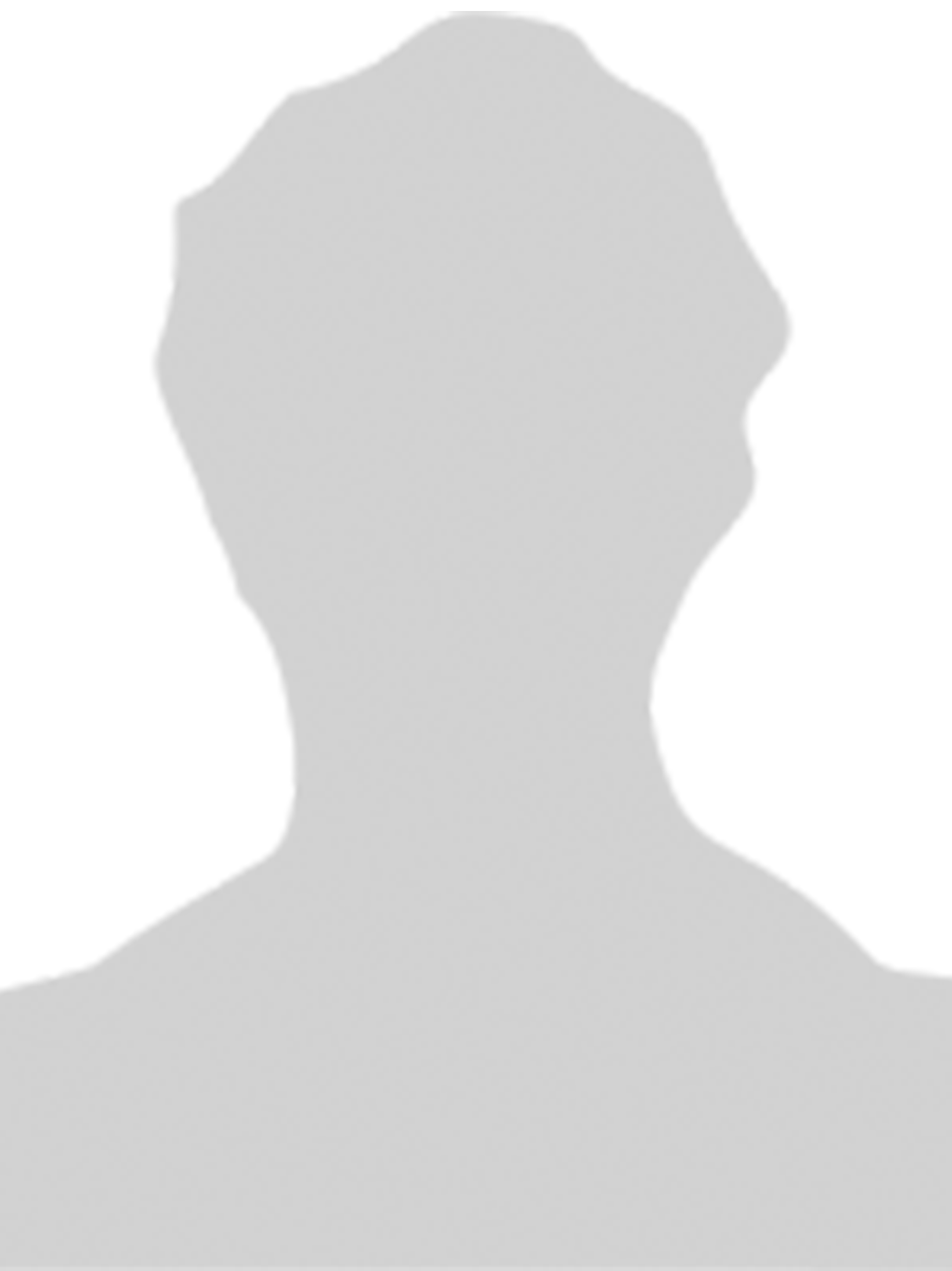

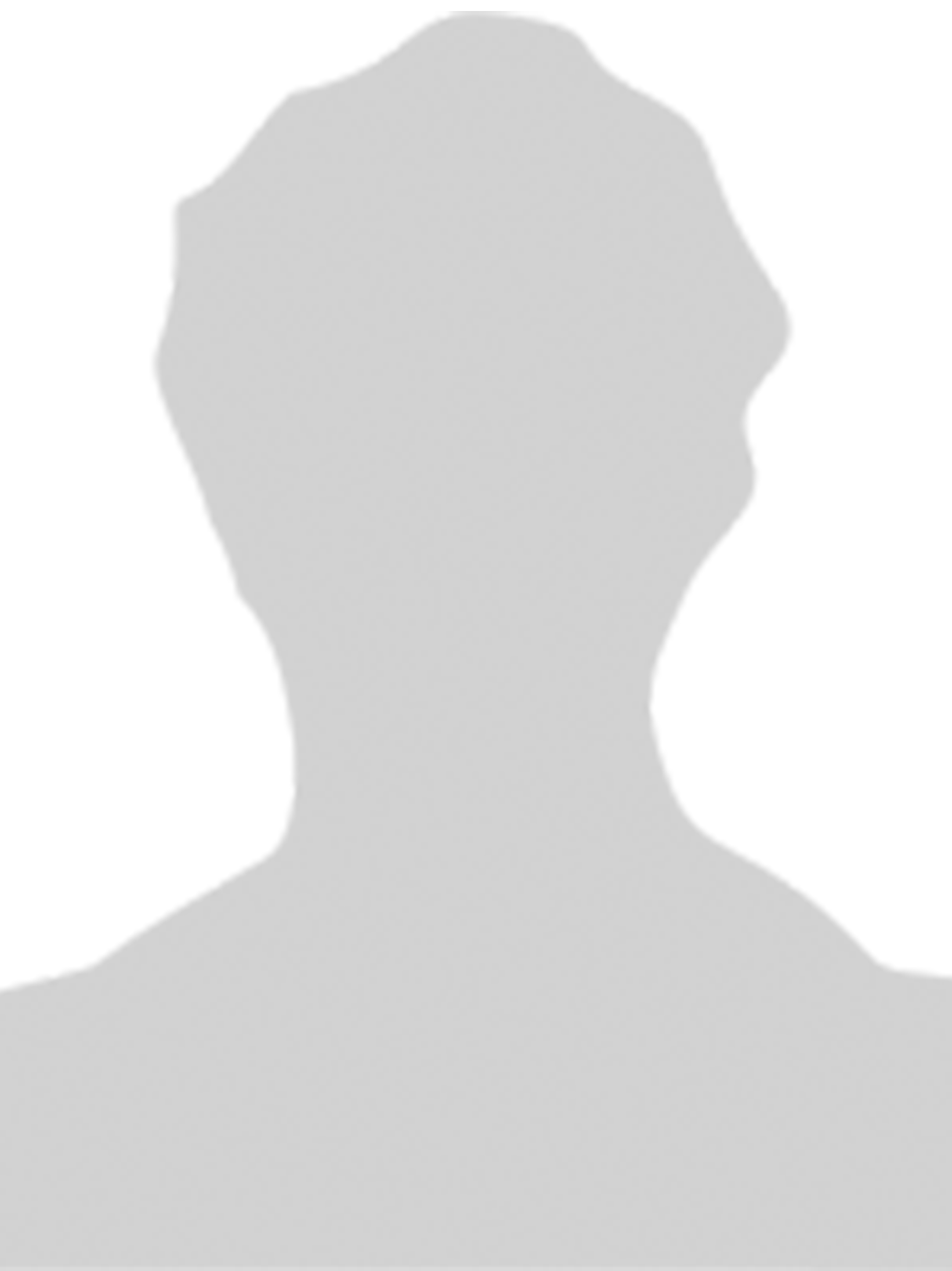

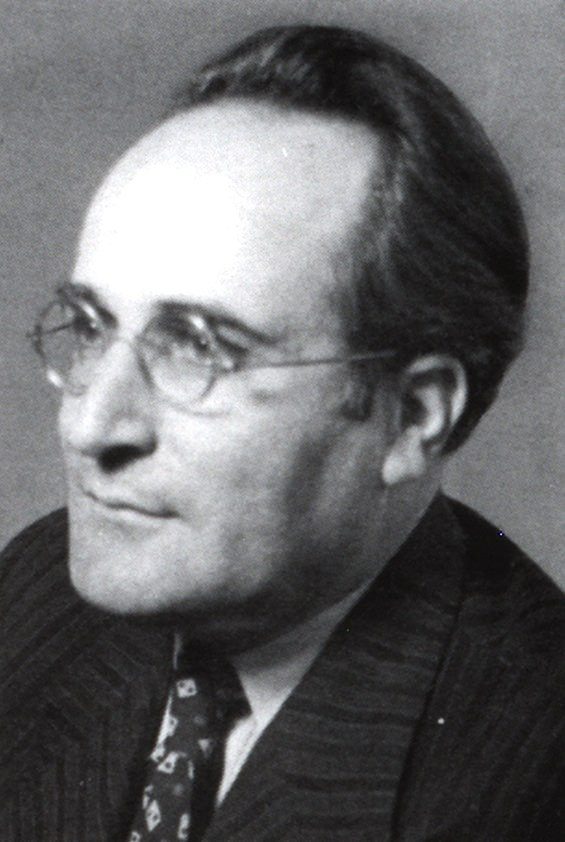

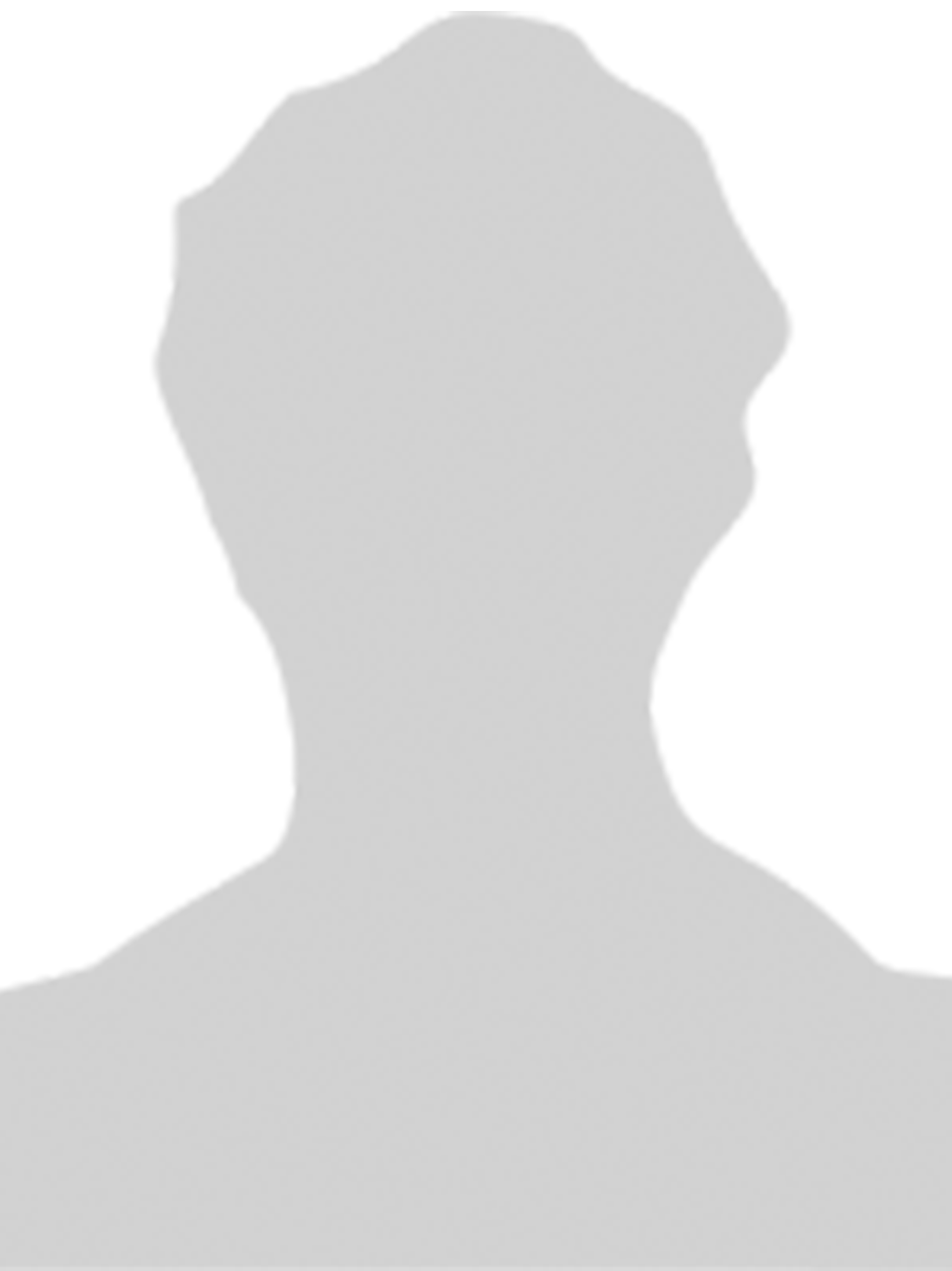

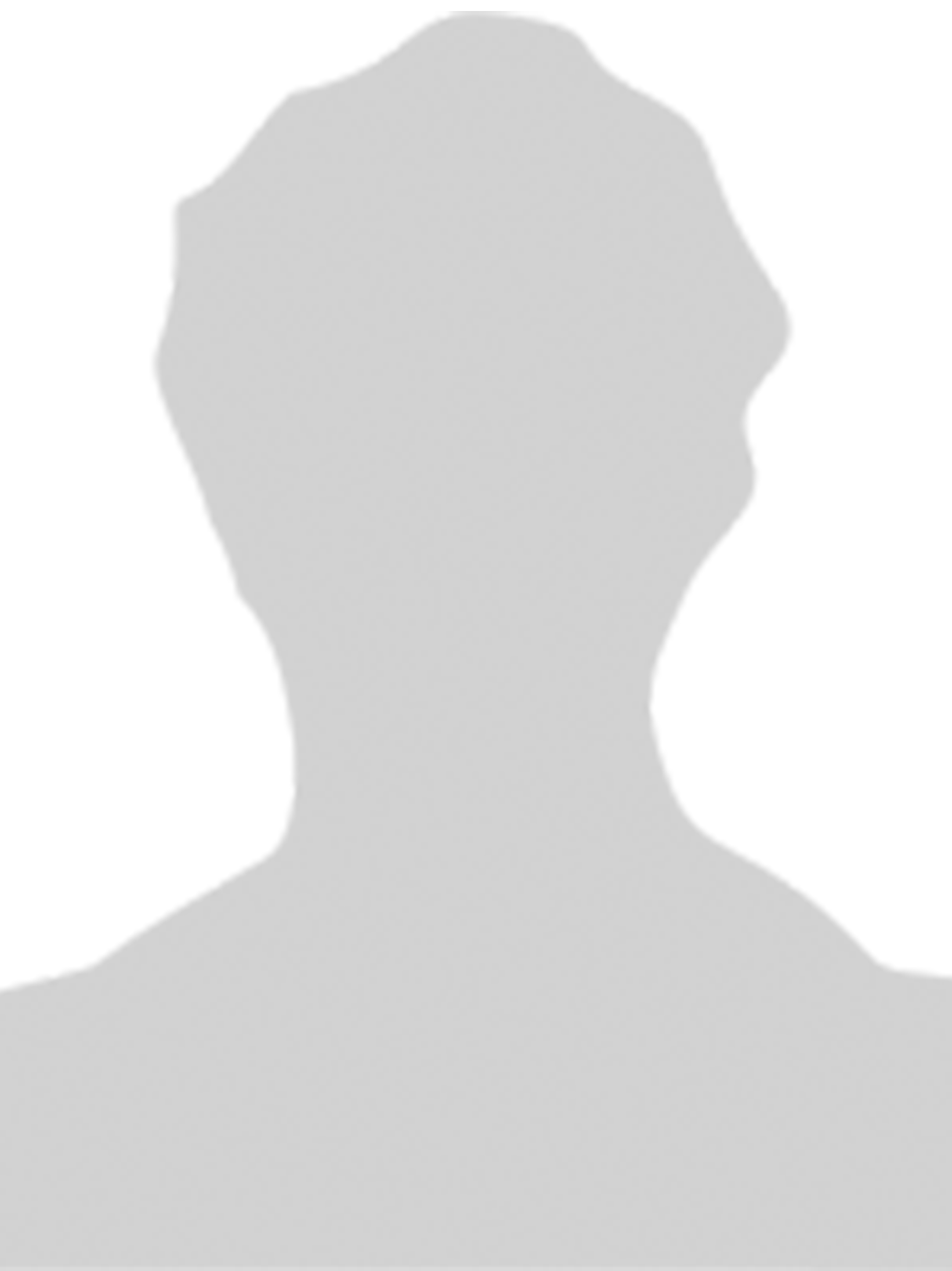
	First party	Second party	Third party
Leader	Georg Meixner	Waldemar von Knoeringen	Joseph Baumgartner
Party	CSU	SPD	BP
Seats won	83	61	28
Seat change	▲19	▼2	▼11
Popular vote	3,691,954	2,733,946	1,286,937
Percentage	38.0%	28.1%	13.2%
Swing	▲10.6%	▲0.1%	▼4.7%
	Fourth party	Fifth party
Leader	Willi Guthsmuths	Otto Bezold
Party	GB/BHE	FDP
Seats won	19	13
Seat change	▼7	▲1
Popular vote	990,109	703,924
Percentage	10.2%	7.2%
Swing	▼2.1%	▲0.1%
- Results for the single-member constituencies.
Minister-President before election
Hans Ehard
CSU
Elected Minister-President
Wilhelm Hoegner
SPD

The 1954 Bavarian state election was held on 28 November 1954 to elect the members of the Third Bavarian Landtag. It is notable for being both the only time that a member of the SPD was elected as Minister-President and the only time that the CSU was in the opposition.

== Background ==
In the previous 1950 election, the CSU had suffered a major blow by losing 40 of its seats within the Landtag. After strenuous negotiations that lasted 17 days, a broad coalition was formed between the CSU, SPD and GB/BHE, with Hans Ehard retaining in his position as Minister-President. With a vote of 131–5, with 36 abstentions he was elected as Minister-President within the Landtag.

=== Auerbach Affair ===
The second Ehard term did not go without scandals, however. In 1946, the Holocaust survivor Philipp Auerbach had been appointed as state commissioner of reparations. His tasks were many, but there was a particular focus on managing the repatriation of and administering reparations checks to those in displacement camps. Auerbach was described as having "acquired the funds for reparations payments in marginally legal, brilliant, and unorthodox ways", but that was not enough. The Bavarian government did not pay the full amount for reparation claims above $600. Instead, claimants received a first installment in cash and a second in the form of compensations checks that could not be renewed until 1 January 1954. Displaced persons, who were often desperate for money, would sell those notes to for 30 to 50 percent of their face values to banks. The banks by 1950 had bought up about $2 million worth of these notes. Minister-President Ehard gave approval for such transactions.

Auerbach eventually lodged a complaint to the state Justice Ministry in December 1950 that residency permits were being counterfeited for money, which blocked the way of actual claimants from receiving funds. Justice Minister Josef Müller however, turned that on its head and blamed Auerbach for such behaviour. On 27 January 1951, the Bavarian police occupied the state reparations office in Munich in search of evidence of fraud and mishandling on the part of Auerbach. While his methods (which included state-backed loans secured by Nazi property) were unorthodox, they were legal, and there was no evidence of him personally enriching himself. However, after a 17-month investigation, a four-month trial was launched (with several figures on the government's side being ex-Nazis, including the judge, Josef Mulzer, who had been on the Supreme Military Court for the Third Reich), which found him guilty and sentenced for two and a half years in prison. In the proceedings, it was also discovered that he had falsely claimed the title of doctor. Auerbach took his own life in prison on 14 August 1952.

== Results ==
While the Auerbach Affair hung over much of Ehard's tenure, none of the intrigue of the first term occurred, and the coalition stayed intact. The only immediate result was the forced resignation of the Justice Minister in 1952. The CSU managed to recoup some of their 1950 losses, gaining 19 seats in the 1954 elections, at the primary expense of the BP and GB/BHE which had divided the right-wing vote in 1950. However, an unlikely coalition formed. Under the leadership of the state SPD chair, Waldemar von Knoeringen, the SPD brokered a Viererkoalition (coalition-of-four) between themselves, the FDP, the BP, and GB/BHE which stemmed from a collective skepticism of the CSU. On 14 December 1954 Wilhelm Hoegner was voted in as Minister-President. In light of this, disputes broke out within the CSU, which led to the resignation of Hans Ehard as party chair in January 1955, but he still retained his position as President of the Landtag.

== Aftermath ==
The Hoegner government fell into a major scandal of its own, but it did not manage to come out intact like Ehard's had. In 1951, businessman Karl Freisehner had approached the government about casino operating concessions in his name. While this was rejected, several Landtag members had received a bribe of 50,000 marks in order to vote yes. With enough pressure, the Bavarian government did give the licences in April 1955. Soon afterwards, the CSU had launched a parliamentary investigation into the opening of the casinos. One of the recipients of the 50,000 mark check was a CSU deputy, Franz Michel, who came forwards to his other party members. Later on he'd claim he burned the check. The crusade against the bribery was now led by Friedrich Zimmermann, who reportedly had incriminating evidence on the Deputy Minister-President and co-founder of the BP, Joseph Baumgartner. In 1957, Baumgartner and Minister of the Interior August Geislhöringer (also a member of the BP) resigned in face of these allegations, and the coalition collapsed. This wasn't enough for Zimmerman and he eventually got what he wanted: in January 1959 Freisehner came forward with documents detailing payments made to the two ministers. Both were sentenced to jail, with Baumgartner receiving two years in prison, and Geislhöringer one and a half. It would later be revealed that the documents Freisehner had presented were most likely forged, however by that point it didn't matter, the BP had managed to destroy its own reputation.

The Viererkoalition officially collapsed on 8 October 1957. due to a combination of the Casino Affair, and the CDU/CSU victory in the 1957 federal election. The right-wing parties abandoned the SPD in reaction to the election, and Hoegner submitted his resignation on 9 October 1957. CSU politician Hanns Seidel was chosen as Minister-President, and formed a coalition with the FDP and GB/BHE, which would last through the 1958 state elections.

== Parties ==
The table below lists parties represented in the Second Landtag of Bavaria.

Name		Ideology	Leader(s)	1950 result	
Name		Ideology	Leader(s)	Votes (%)	Seats
CSU	Christian Social Union in Bavaria; Christlich-Soziale Union in Bayern	Christian democracy	Alois Hundhammer	27.4	64 / 204
SPD	Social Democratic Party of Germany; Sozialdemokratische Partei Deutschlands	Social democracy	Jean Stock	28.0	63 / 204
BP	Bavaria Party; Bayernpartei	Bavarian nationalism	Joseph Baumgartner	17.9	39 / 204
GB/BHE	All-German Bloc/League of Expellees and Deprived of Rights; Gesamtdeutscher Block/Bund der Heimatvertriebenen und Entrechteten	German nationalism	Willi Guthsmuths	12.2	26 / 204
FDP	Free Democratic Party; Freie Demokratische Partei	Liberalism	Otto Bezold	7.1	12 / 204

Summary of the 26 November 1950 election results of the Landtag of Bavaria
Party	Votes	%	+/-	Seats	+/-	Seats %
Christian Social Union (CSU)	3,691,954	38.0	▲10.6	83	▲19	40.7
Social Democratic Party (SPD)	2,733,946	28.1	▲0.1	61	▼2	29.9
Bavaria Party	1,286,937	13.2	▼4.7	28	▼11	13.7
All-German Bloc/League of Expellees and Deprived of Rights (GB/BHE)	990,109	10.2	▼2.1	19	▼7	9.3
Free Democratic Party (FDP)	653,741	7.1	▲1.4	13	▲1	6.4
Communist Party (KPD)	205,206	2.1	▲0.2	0	±0	0
Others	111,652	1.2		0	±0	0
Total	9,673,545	100.0		204		
Voter turnout		82.4	▲2.5			
Source: Statistik Bayern and Historisches Lexikon Bayerns

Popular Vote
CSU	38.0%
SPD	28.1%
BP	13.2%
GB/BHE	10.2%
FDP	7.2%
KPD	2.1%
Other	1.2%

Landtag seats
CSU	40.7%
SPD	29.9%
BP	13.7%
GB/BHE	9.3%
FDP	6.4%
