= Baden Landtag elections in the Weimar Republic =

German state elections

Landtag elections in the Republic of Baden (Republik Baden) during the Weimar Republic were held on four occasions between 1919 and 1929. Results with regard to the percentage of the vote won and the number of seats allocated to each party are presented in the tables below. On 31 March 1933, the sitting Landtag was dissolved by the Nazi-controlled central government and reconstituted to reflect the distribution of seats in the national Reichstag. The Landtag subsequently was formally abolished as a result of the "Law on the Reconstruction of the Reich" of 30 January 1934 which replaced the German federal system with a unitary state.

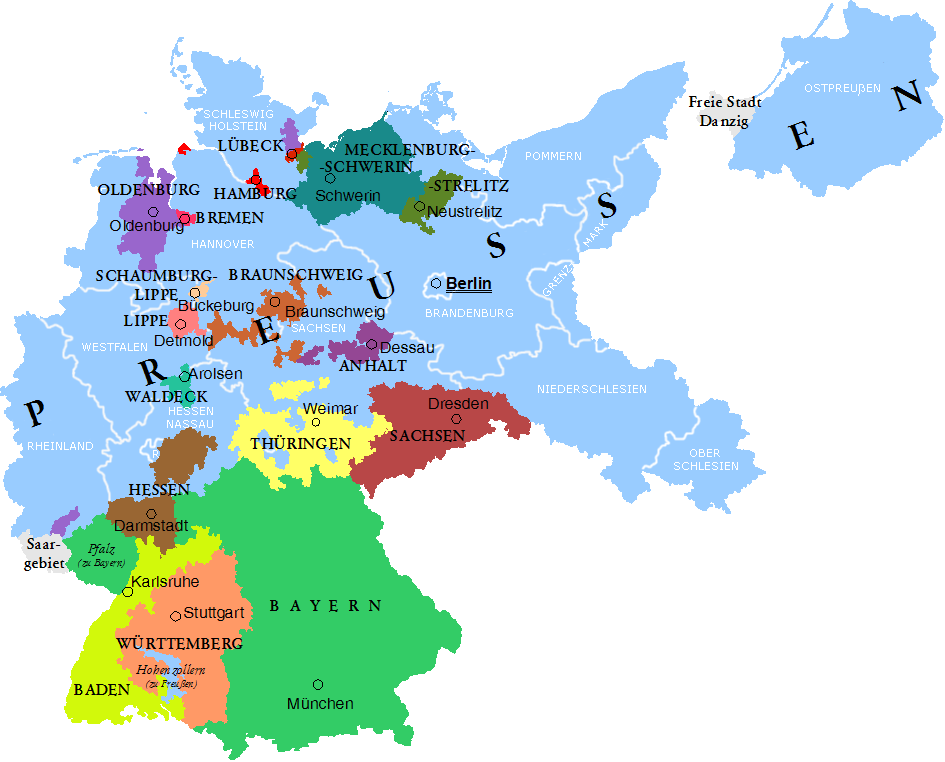
Baden in the Weimar Republic. At the bottom-left in chartreuse.

== 1919 ==
The 1919 Baden state election was held on 5 January 1919 to elect 107 members of the National Constitutional Assembly.

1919 Baden Landtag election
Party	Votes	%	Seats
Centre Party	376,208	36.63	39
Social Democratic Party	329,317	32.06	36
German Democratic Party	233,956	22.78	25
German National People's Party	72,211	7.03	7
Independent Social Democratic Party of Germany	15,449	1.50	0
Total	1,027,141	100.00	107
Valid votes	1,027,141	99.82	
Invalid/blank votes	1,897	0.18	
Total votes	1,029,038	100.00	
Registered voters/turnout	1,168,432	88.07	
Source: Elections in Germany

== 1921 ==
The 1921 Baden state election was held on 30 October 1921 to elect the 86 members of the Landtag.

1921 Baden Landtag election
Party	Votes	%	Seats	+/–
Centre Party	341,438	37.87	34	-5
Social Democratic Party	204,416	22.67	20	-16
German Democratic Party	76,264	8.46	7	-18
German National People's Party	76,229	8.45	7	0
Baden Rural People's Party	74,896	8.31	7	New
German People's Party	54,426	6.04	5	New
Communist Party of Germany	35,375	3.92	3	New
Independent Social Democratic Party of Germany	27,197	3.02	2	+2
Reich Party of the German Middle Class	11,429	1.27	1	New
Total	901,670	100.00	86	-21
Valid votes	901,670	99.50		
Invalid/blank votes	4,563	0.50		
Total votes	906,233	100.00		
Registered voters/turnout	1,311,527	69.10		
Source: Elections in Germany

== 1925 ==
The 1925 Baden state election was held on 25 October 1925 to elect the 72 members of the Landtag.

1925 Baden Landtag election
Party	Votes	%	Seats	+/–
Centre Party	283,414	36.81	28	-6
Social Democratic Party	160,498	20.85	16	-4
German National People's Party	93,750	12.18	8	+1
German People's Party	72,887	9.47	7	+2
German Democratic Party	66,652	8.66	6	-1
Communist Party of Germany	47,343	6.15	4	+1
Reich Party of the German Middle Class	22,856	2.97	3	+2
Nazi Party	8,917	1.16	0	New
German Völkisch Freedom Party	6,420	0.83	0	New
German Revaluation and Reconstruction Party	4,176	0.54	0	New
Baden Tenants' and Small Farmers' Association	2,979	0.39	0	New
Total	769,892	100.00	72	-14
Valid votes	769,892	98.77		
Invalid/blank votes	9,608	1.23		
Total votes	779,500	100.00		
Registered voters/turnout	1,439,235	54.16		
Source: Elections in Germany

== 1929 ==
The 1929 Baden state election was held on 27 October 1929 to elect the 88 members of the Landtag.

1929 Baden Landtag election
Party	Votes	%	Seats	+/–
Centre Party	341,754	36.66	34	+6
Social Democratic Party	187,087	20.07	18	+2
German People's Party	74,340	7.97	7	0
Nazi Party	65,121	6.98	6	+6
German Democratic Party	62,344	6.69	6	0
Communist Party of Germany	55,143	5.91	5	+1
Reich Party of the German Middle Class	35,605	3.82	3	0
Christian Social People's Service	35,317	3.79	3	New
German National People's Party	34,079	3.66	3	-5
Christian-National Peasants' and Farmers' Party	28,267	3.03	3	New
Reich Party for Civil Rights and Deflation	6,680	0.72	0	New
Christian Social Reich Party	5,086	0.55	0	New
Left Communists	1,530	0.16	0	New
Total	932,353	100.00	88	+16
Valid votes	932,353	98.74		
Invalid/blank votes	11,888	1.26		
Total votes	944,241	100.00		
Registered voters/turnout	1,537,962	61.40		
Source: Elections in Germany

== See also ==
- Landtag of the Republic of Baden
