= 2003 Bavarian state election =

State election in Bavaria, Germany

← 1998	21 September 2003	2008 →

All 180 seats in the Landtag of Bavaria 91 seats needed for a majority
- Turnout: 10,248,735 (57.1%) ▼12.7%
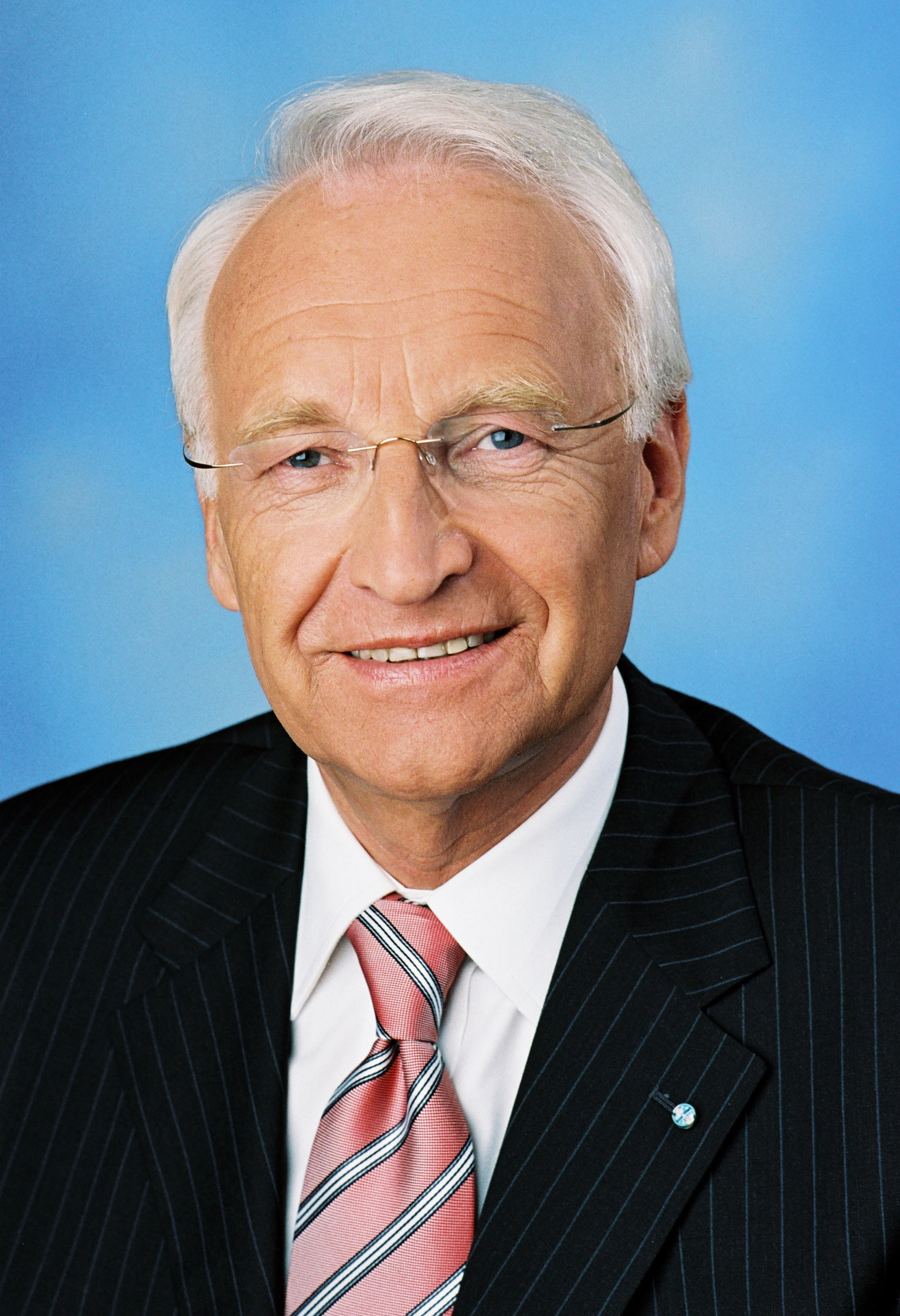

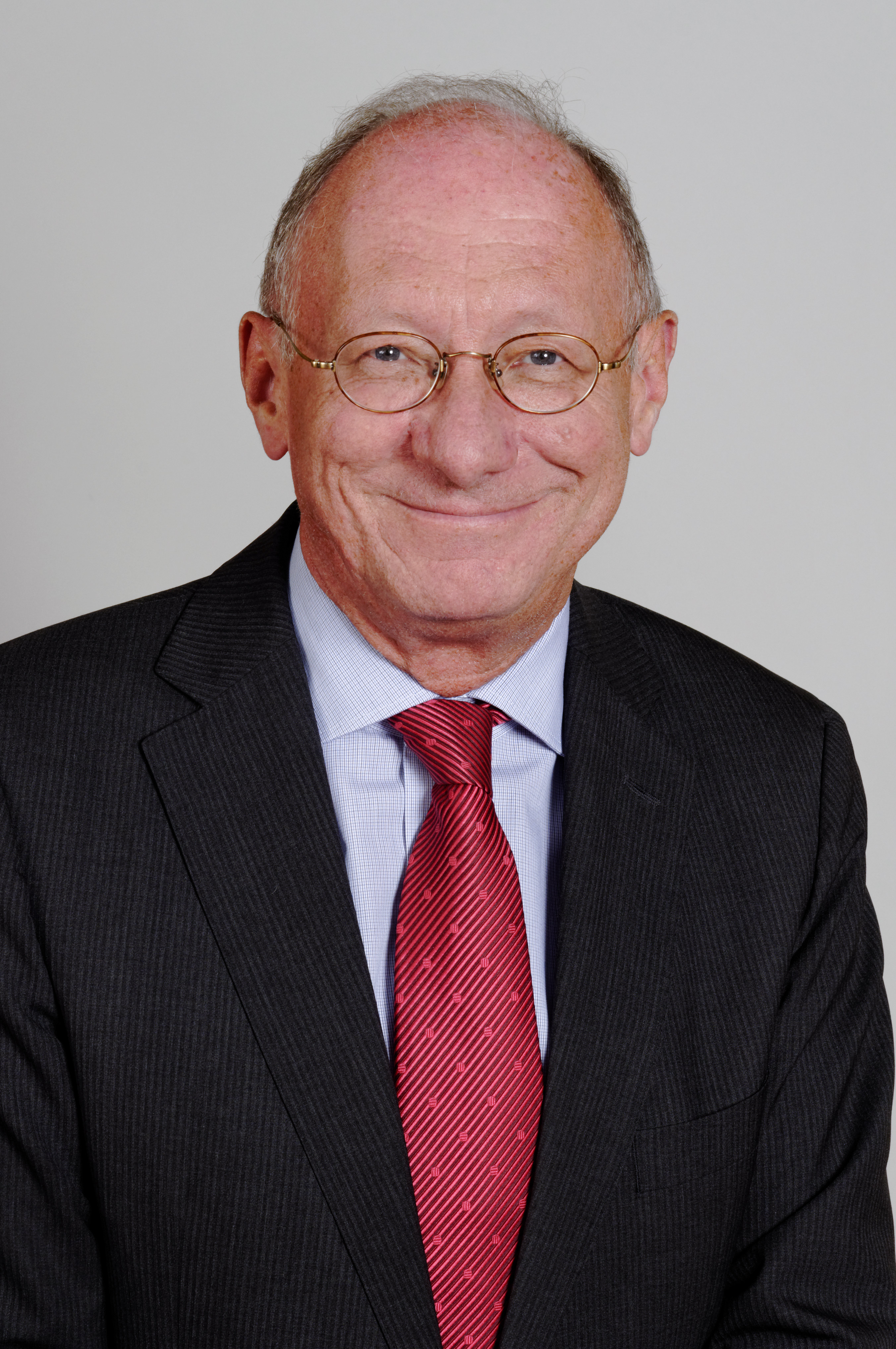

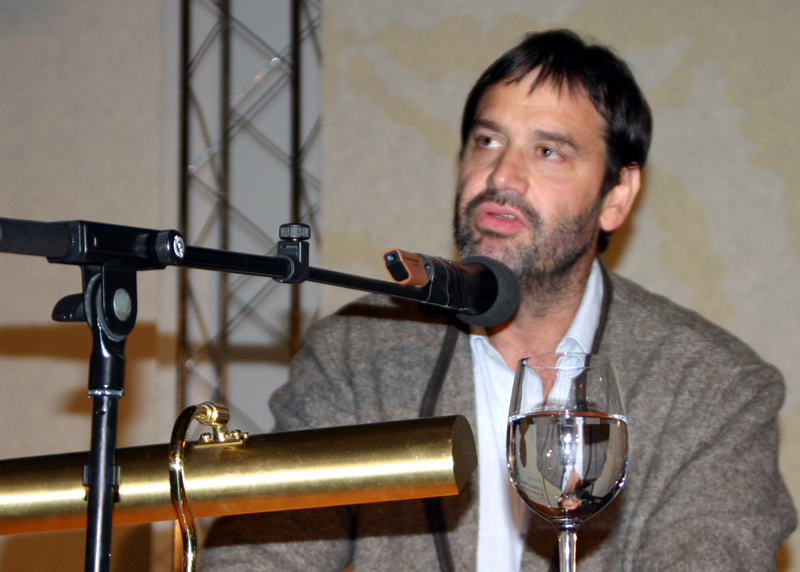
	First party	Second party	Third party
Leader	Edmund Stoiber	Franz Maget	Sepp Daxenberger
Party	CSU	SPD	Greens
Last election	123 seats, 52.9%	67 seats, 28.7%	14 seats, 5.7%
Seats won	124	41	15
Seat change	▲1	▼26	▲1
Popular vote	6,217,864	2,012,265	793,050
Percentage	60.7%	19.6%	7.7%
Swing	▲7.8%	▼9.1%	▲2.1%
- Results for the single-member constituencies.
Minister-President before election
Edmund Stoiber
CSU
Elected Minister-President
Edmund Stoiber
CSU

The 2003 Bavarian state election was held on 21 September 2003 to elect the members to the 15th Landtag of Bavaria. The Christian Social Union (CSU) led by Minister-President Edmund Stoiber achieved the largest majority in German history, winning 69% of the seats in the Landtag. This election was the first and to date only time a single party won a two-thirds supermajority of seats in any German state parliament. The CSU also won its largest proportion of the popular vote since 1974, at 60.7%.

The election was marked by a major decline in turnout, falling by almost 13 points to 57%. As a result, despite achieving its best result in decades, the CSU won 230,000 votes fewer than it had in the 1998 election.

== Parties ==
The table below lists parties represented in the 14th Landtag of Bavaria.

Name		Ideology	Leader(s)	1998 result	
Name		Ideology	Leader(s)	Votes (%)	Seats
CSU	Christian Social Union in Bavaria; Christlich-Soziale Union in Bayern	Christian democracy	Edmund Stoiber	52.9%	123 / 204
SPD	Social Democratic Party of Germany; Sozialdemokratische Partei Deutschlands	Social democracy	Franz Maget	28.7%	67 / 204
Grüne	Alliance 90/The Greens; Bündnis 90/Die Grünen	Green politics	Sepp Daxenberger	5.7%	14 / 204

== Opinion polling ==
Polling firm	Fieldwork date	Sample size	CSU	SPD	Grüne	FW	FDP	Others	Lead
2003 state election	21 Sep 2003	–	60.7	19.6	7.7	4.0	2.6	5.4 (Note: 2.2% REP, 2.0% ÖDP, 1.2% Other)	41.1
Infratest dimap	6–10 Sep 2003	1,000	59	20	8	4	4	5	39
Forsa	1–5 Sep 2003	1,006	61	20	8	–	4	7	41
Forschungsgruppe Wahlen	1–4 Sep 2003	1,033	60	22	8	4	3	3	38
Forsa	4–8 Aug 2003	1,001	61	21	8	–	3	7	40
Forsa	1–11 Jul 2003	1,266	59	24	8	–	3	6	35
Infratest dimap	14–18 May 2003	1,000	60	22	8	–	4	6	38
GMS	13–18 Feb 2003	1,004	60.0	23.0	6.5	0.5	4.0	6.0 (Note: 1.0% PDS, 0.5% REP, 0.5% ÖDP, 4.0% Other)	37
Infratest dimap	2–5 Jan 2003	1,000	61	24	7	–	3	5	37
Infratest dimap	31 Jul–4 Aug 2002	1,000	57	26	5	–	5	7	31
Infratest dimap	3–7 Apr 2002	1,000	55	28	5	–	4	8 (Note: 2% Right-wing parties, 6% Other)	27
Infratest dimap	7–12 Jan 2002	1,000	56	27	6	–	4	7 (Note: 2% Right-wing parties, 5% Other)	29
GMS	15 Nov–21 Dec 2001	2,014	55.0	27.5	5.0	1.5	3.5	7.5 (Note: 3.0% PRO, 1.0% REP, 1.0% PDS, 0.5% ÖDP, 2.0% Other)	27.5
Infratest dimap	9–13 Jul 2001	1,000	54	29	7	–	3	7 (Note: 2% Right-wing parties, 5% Other)	25
Infratest dimap	3–6 Jan 2001	1,000	54	28	7	–	4	7 (Note: 2% Right-wing parties, 5% Other)	26
Infratest dimap	26 Jun–1 Jul 2000	1,000	57	27	6	–	3	7 (Note: 2% Right-wing parties, 5% Other)	30
Infratest dimap	3–7 Jan 2000	1,000	60	25	5	–	1	9 (Note: 3% Right-wing parties, 6% Other)	35
Infratest dimap	August 1999	?	60	24	5	–	2	9 (Note: 3% Right-wing parties, 6% Other)	36
1998 state election	13 Sep 1998	–	52.9	28.7	5.7	3.7	1.7	7.3 (Note: 3.6% REP, 1.8% ÖDP, 1.9% Other)	24.2

== Election result ==
Summary of the 21 September 2003 election results for the Landtag of Bavaria
Party	Votes	%	+/–	Seats	+/–
Christian Social Union (CSU)	6,217,864	60.67	+7.8	124	+1
Social Democratic Party (SPD)	2,012,265	19.63	-9.1	41	-26
Alliance 90/The Greens (Grüne)	793,050	7.74	+2.1	15	+1
Free Voters of Bavaria (FW)	411,306	4.01	+0.4	0	±0
Free Democratic Party (FDP)	263,731	2.57	+0.9	0	±0
The Republicans (REP)	229,464	2.24	-1.4	0	±0
Ecological Democratic Party (ÖDP)	200,103	1.95	+0.2	0	±0
Bavaria Party (BP)	77,390	0.76	±0.0	0	±0
Others	43,562	0.43		0	±0
Total	10,248,735	100.00	–	180	–

Popular vote
CSU	60.67%
SPD	19.63%
B'90/GRÜNE	7.74%
FW	4.01%
FDP	2.57%
Other	5.38%

Landtag seats
CSU	68.89%
SPD	22.78%
B'90/GRÜNE	8.33%

== Sources ==
- Results of 2003 Bavaria state election
