= 1990 Bavarian state election =

State election in Bavaria, Germany

- 14 October 1990

All 204 seats in the Landtag of Bavaria 103 seats needed for a majority
- Turnout: 11,098,912 (65.9%) ▼4.2%
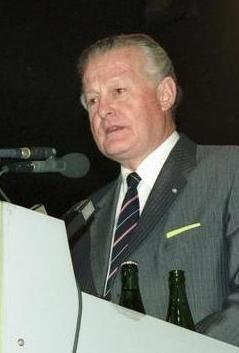

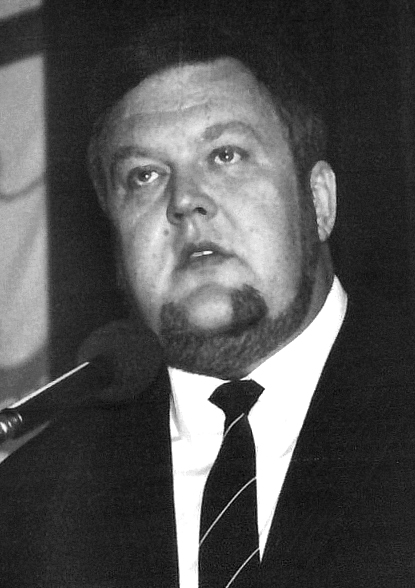
	First party	Second party
Leader	Max Streibl	Karl-Heinz Hiersemann
Party	CSU	SPD
Last election	128 seats, 55.8%	61 seats, 27.5%
Seats won	127	58
Seat change	▼1	▼3
Popular vote	6,093,514	2,882,008
Percentage	54.9%	26.0%
Swing	▼0.9%	▼1.5%
	Third party	Fourth party
Party	Greens	FDP
Last election	15 seats, 7.5%	0 seats, 3.8%
Seats won	12	7
Seat change	▼3	▲7
Popular vote	712,101	572,338
Percentage	6.4%	5.2%
Swing	▼1.1%	▲1.4%
- Results for the single-member constituencies.
Minister-President before election
Max Streibl
CSU
Elected Minister-President
Max Streibl
CSU

The 1990 Bavarian state election was held on 14 October 1990 to elect the members of the 12th Landtag of Bavaria. It took place shortly after the formal reunification of Germany on 3 October. The Christian Social Union (CSU) led by Minister-President Max Streibl retained its majority. The Free Democratic Party (FDP) also re-entered the Landtag for the first time since 1982.

== Parties ==
The table below lists parties represented in the 11th Landtag of Bavaria.

Name		Ideology	Leader(s)	1986 result	
Name		Ideology	Leader(s)	Votes (%)	Seats
CSU	Christian Social Union in Bavaria; Christlich-Soziale Union in Bayern	Christian democracy	Max Streibl	55.8%	128 / 204
SPD	Social Democratic Party of Germany; Sozialdemokratische Partei Deutschlands	Social democracy	Karl-Heinz Heirsemann	27.5%	61 / 204
Grüne	The Greens; Die Grünen	Green politics		7.5%	15 / 204

== Election result ==
Summary of the 14 October 1990 election results for the Landtag of Bavaria
Party	Votes	%	+/-	Seats	+/-	Seats %
Christian Social Union (CSU)	6,093,514	54.9	▼0.9	127	▼1	62.3
Social Democratic Party (SPD)	2,882,008	26.0	▼1.5	58	▼3	28.4
The Greens (Grüne)	712,101	6.4	▼1.1	12	▼3	5.9
Free Democratic Party (FDP)	572,338	5.2	▲1.4	7	▲7	3.4
The Republicans (REP)	538,615	4.9	▲1.9	0	±0	0
Ecological Democratic Party (ÖDP)	192,414	1.7	▲1.0	0	±0	0
Others	106,922	1.0		0	±0	0
Total	11,098,912	100.0		204	±0	
Voter turnout		65.9	▼4.2			

Popular vote
CSU	54.90%
SPD	25.97%
GRÜNE	6.42%
FDP	5.17%
REP	4.85%
Other	2.70%

Landtag seats
CSU	62.25%
SPD	28.43%
GRÜNE	5.88%
FDP	3.43%

== Sources ==
- Bayerisches Landesamt für Statistik
