= 1998 Bavarian state election =

State election in Germany

← 1994	13 September 1998	2003 →

All 204 seats in the Landtag of Bavaria 103 seats needed for a majority
- Turnout: 12,186,909 (69.8%) ▲2.0%
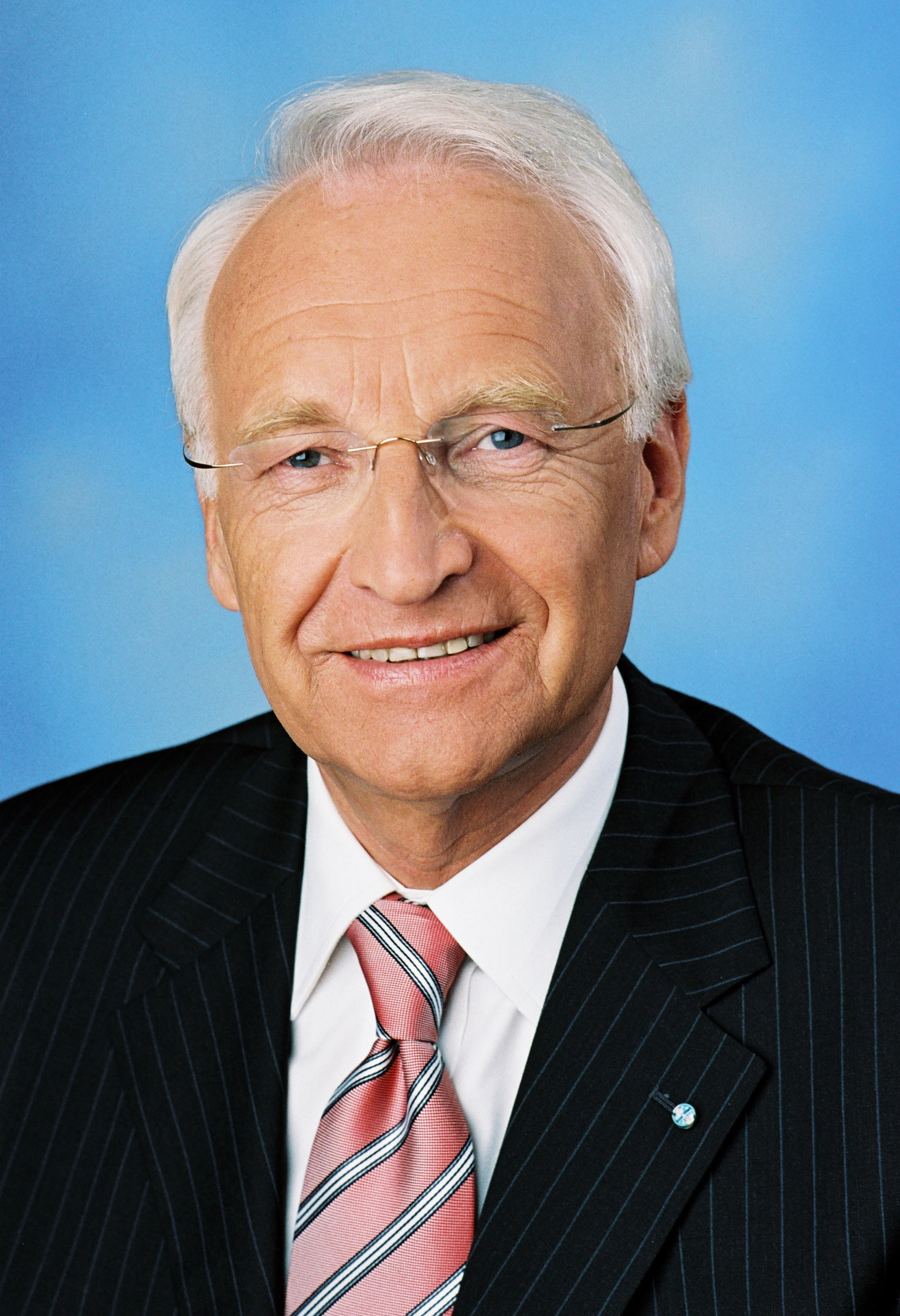

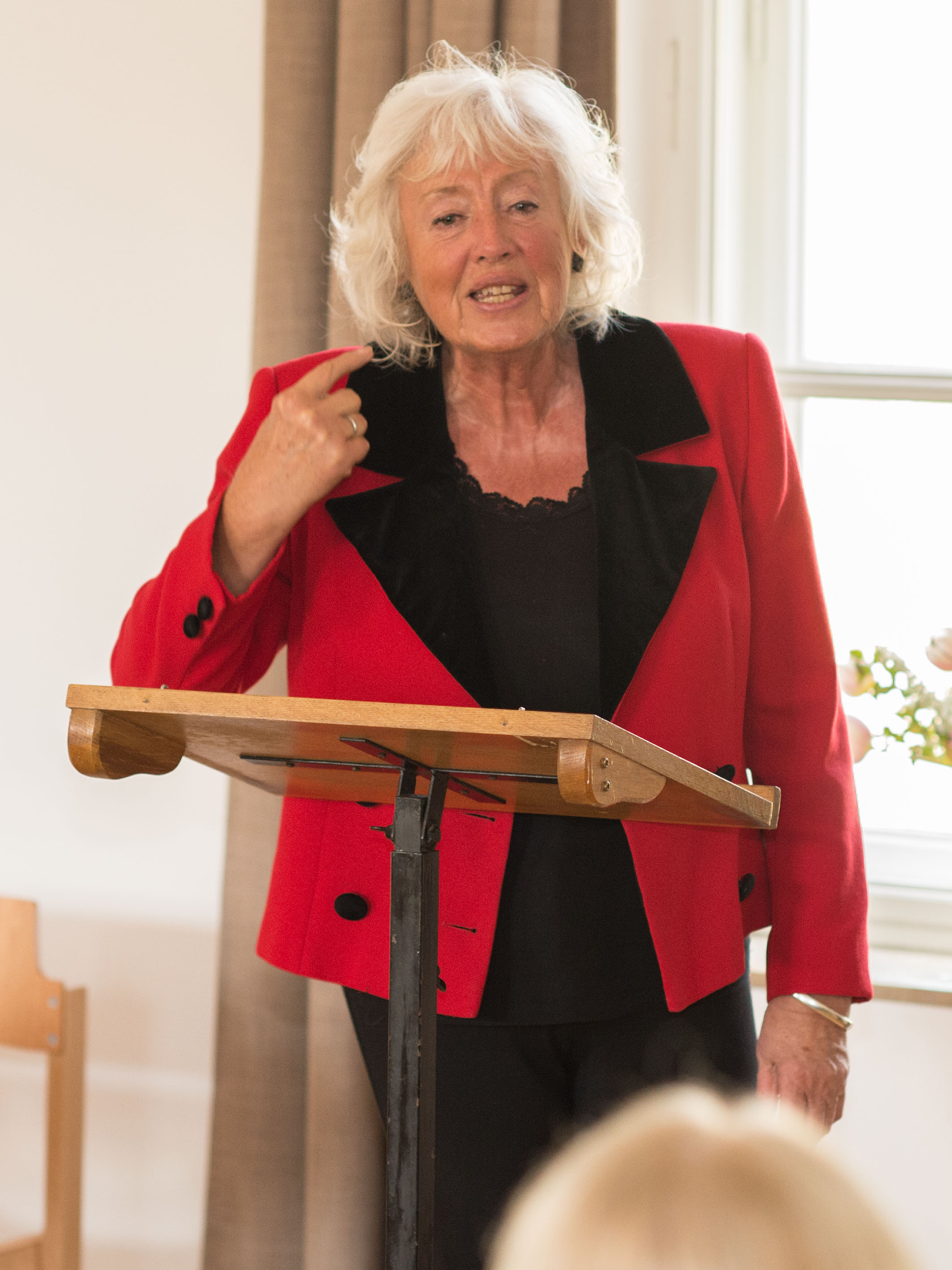

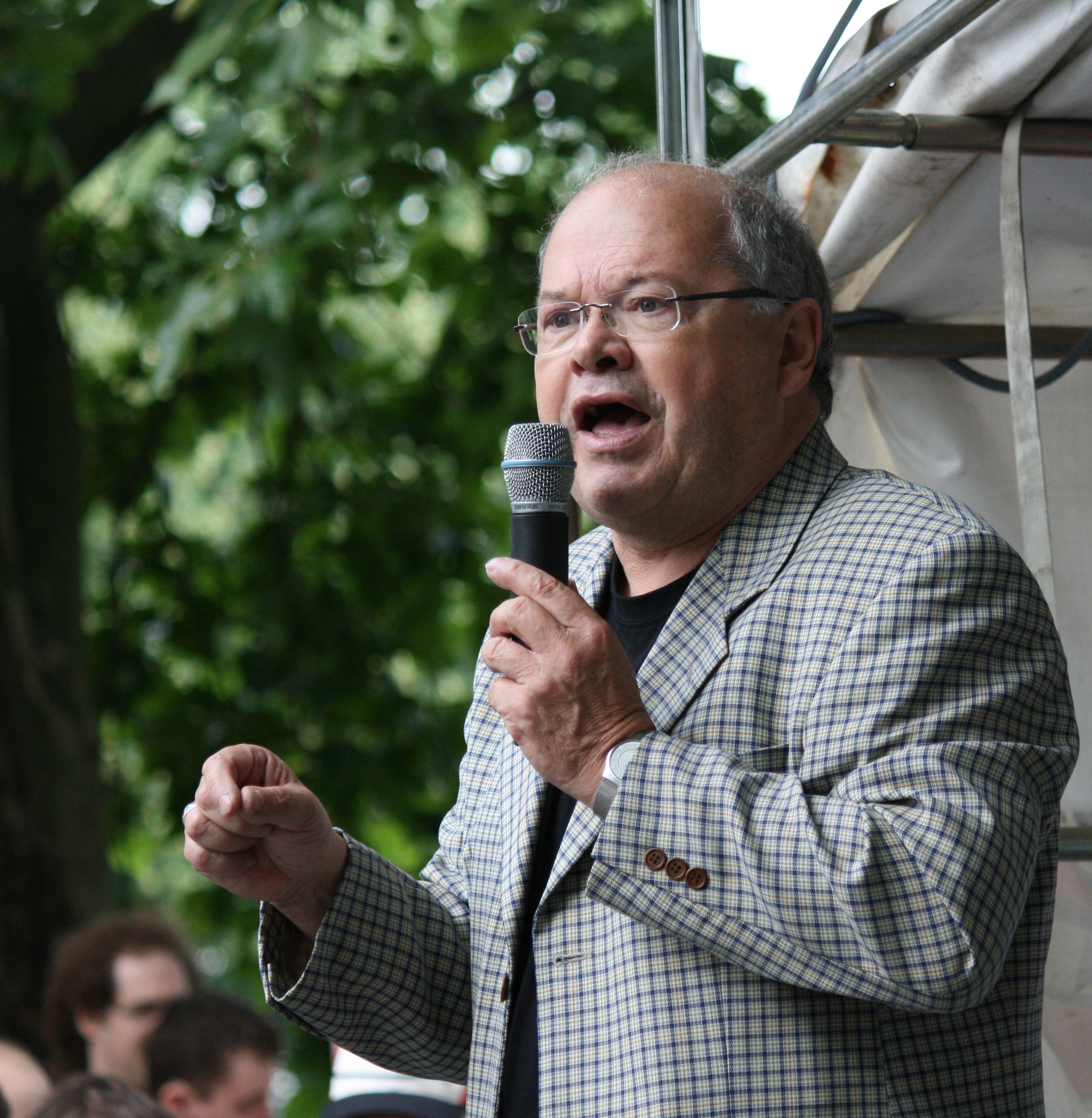
	First party	Second party	Third party
Leader	Edmund Stoiber	Renate Schmidt	Jerzy Montag
Party	CSU	SPD	Greens
Last election	120 seats, 52.8%	70 seats, 30.0%	14 seats, 6.1%
Seats won	123	67	14
Seat change	▲3	▼3	0
Popular vote	6,447,764	3,501,900	692,456
Percentage	52.9%	28.7%	5.7%
Swing	▲0.1%	▼1.3%	▼0.4%
- Results for the single-member constituencies.
Minister-President before election
Edmund Stoiber
CSU
Elected Minister-President
Edmund Stoiber
CSU

The 1998 Bavarian state election was held on 13 September 1998 to elect the members of the 14th Landtag of Bavaria. The Christian Social Union (CSU) led by Minister-President Edmund Stoiber retained its majority with minor gains, while the opposition took minor losses. The largest change in the election was the rise in popularity of the Free Voters of Bavaria, who won 3.7% of the vote, but failed to win any seats.

== Parties ==
The table below lists parties represented in the 13th Landtag of Bavaria.

Name		Ideology	Leader(s)	1994 result	
Name		Ideology	Leader(s)	Votes (%)	Seats
CSU	Christian Social Union in Bavaria; Christlich-Soziale Union in Bayern	Christian democracy	Edmund Stoiber	52.8%	120 / 204
SPD	Social Democratic Party of Germany; Sozialdemokratische Partei Deutschlands	Social democracy	Renate Schmidt	30.0%	70 / 204
Grüne	Alliance 90/The Greens; Bündnis 90/Die Grünen	Green politics	Jerzy Montag	6.1%	14 / 204

== Opinion polling ==
Polling firm	Fieldwork date	Sample size	CSU	SPD	Grüne	REP	FDP	FW	Others	Lead
1998 state election	13 Sep 1998	–	52.9	28.7	5.7	3.6	1.7	3.7	3.7 (Note: 1.8% ÖDP, 1.9% Other)	24.2
Forsa	?	?	49	34	5	4	2	3	3	15
Polis	27 Aug–1 Sep 1998	1,010	50	33	6	3	3	3	2	17
Forschungsgruppe Wahlen	24–26 Aug 1998	979	51	32	5	4	2	4	3	19
Infratest dimap	21–26 Aug 1998	1,000	50	32	5	2	3	4	4	18
Forsa	?	?	47	35	5	–	3	–	10 (Note: 4% Right-wing parties, 6% Other)	12
INRA	1998	?	46	35	?	?	?	?	?	11
Forschungsgruppe Wahlen	15–19 May 1998	1,011	46	34	5	4	3	2	6 (Note: 3% ÖDP, 3% Other)	12
INRA	1998	1,000	46	36	5	3	3	3	?	10
Forschungsgruppe Wahlen	16–18 Feb 1998	1,009	46	32	7	5	3	3	4	14
Forsa	31 Aug 1997	~1,000	47	33	?	?	?	3	?	14
1994 state election	25 Sep 1994	–	52.8	30.0	6.1	3.9	2.8	0.1	4.3 (Note: 2.1% ÖDP, 2.2% Other)	22.8

== Election result ==
Party	Votes	%	+/–	Seats	+/–
Christian Social Union (CSU)	6,447,764	52.91	+0.8	123	+3
Social Democratic Party (SPD)	3,501,900	28.73	-1.3	67	-3
Alliance 90/The Greens Grüne)	692,456	5.68	-0.4	14	±0
Free Voters of Bavaria (FW)	446,115	3.66	+3.6	0	±0
The Republicans (REP)	438,144	3.60	-0.3	0	±0
Ecological Democratic Party (ÖDP)	217,840	1.79	-0.3	0	±0
Free Democratic Party (FDP)	201,788	1.66	-1.1	0	±0
Others	240,902	1.98	-0.4	0	±0
Total	12,186,909	100.00	–	204	–

Popular vote
CSU	52.91%
SPD	28.73%
B'90/GRÜNE	5.68%
Other	12.68%

Landtag seats
CSU	60.29%
SPD	32.84%
B'90/GRÜNE	6.86%

== Sources ==
- The Federal Returning Officer
