= Max Streibl =

German politician (1932–1998)

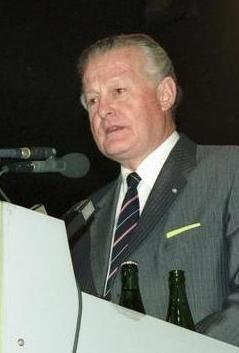
- Streibl in 1989

Minister President of Bavaria
- In office 3 October 1988 – 28 May 1993
- President: Richard von Weizsäcker
- Chancellor: Helmut Kohl
- Preceded by: Franz Josef Strauss
- Succeeded by: Edmund Stoiber

Bavarian Minister for the Environment
- In office 1970–1977

Bavarian Minister for Finance
- In office 1977–1988

Personal details
- Born: 6 January 1932 Oberammergau, Bavaria, Germany
- Died: 11 December 1998 (aged 66) Munich, Bavaria, Germany
- Party: Christian Social Union (CSU)
- Spouse: Irmingard
- Children: 3
- Occupation: Lawyer

Max Streibl (6 January 1932 – 11 December 1998) was a German politician of the Christian Social Union (CSU) party and the eighth Minister President of Bavaria.

== Biography ==
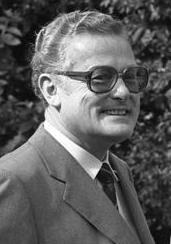
Streibl in 1981

Streibel was born in Oberammergau in 1932, where his parents owned a hotel business. He married his wife Irmingard in 1960, and they had one daughter and two sons.

After going to school in Ettal, he studied law at the Ludwig-Maximilians-Universität München (now LMU Munich), graduating in 1955. He worked in Garmisch-Partenkirchen, and later, at the German Bundesrat in Bonn and joined the local government of the region of Upper Bavaria in 1960. From 1961, he worked for the state government and began to rise in the ranks of the CSU. From 1961 to 1967, he led the Junge Union (Young Union), the youth organisation of CDU and CSU in Bavaria.

He became a member of the Bavarian Landtag in 1962, a position he held until 1994, when he retired. He was then the General Secretary of the party from 1967 to 1970.

Streibl served as Bavarian Minister for the Environment (1970–1977), a newly formed ministry, and for Finance (1977–1988). After the sudden death of Franz Josef Strauß in 1988, Streibl succeeded him as Ministerpräsident of Bavaria on 19 October 1988. Streibl was deeply rooted in Catholicism, but soon became unpopular because of alleged bribery (he was paid holiday trips by Burkhart Grob, the chairman of an aircraft production company). Because of this so-called "amigo-affair", coming to the surface in January 1993, he was forced to resign on 27 May 1993 and Edmund Stoiber took office, despite the latter being involved in the affair, too. The affair did result in a policy change in Bavaria, aimed at untangling the connections between politics and business.

Streibl's defiant final words upon his resignation, with a tear in his eyes, were "Adios Amigos!".

He retired from politics shortly after and died in December 1998 in Munich.

== Honors ==
- Honorary Doctorates from the University of Passau (1985) and LMU Munich (1990).
- Grand Cross of Merit of the Italian Republic (1988)
- Honorary Citizen of Oberammergau (1989)
- Grand Cross of the Order Pro Merito Melitensi of the Sovereign Military Order of Malta
- Order of the Holy Sepulchre
- Grand Order of King Dmitar Zvonimir, Croatia

Political offices
Preceded by Franz Josef Strauss	Prime Minister of Bavaria; 1988 – 1993	Succeeded by Edmund Stoiber
