= 1994 Bavarian state election =

State election in Bavaria, Germany

- 25 September 1994

All 204 seats in the Landtag of Bavaria 103 seats needed for a majority
- Turnout: 11,669,881 (67.8%) ▲1.9%
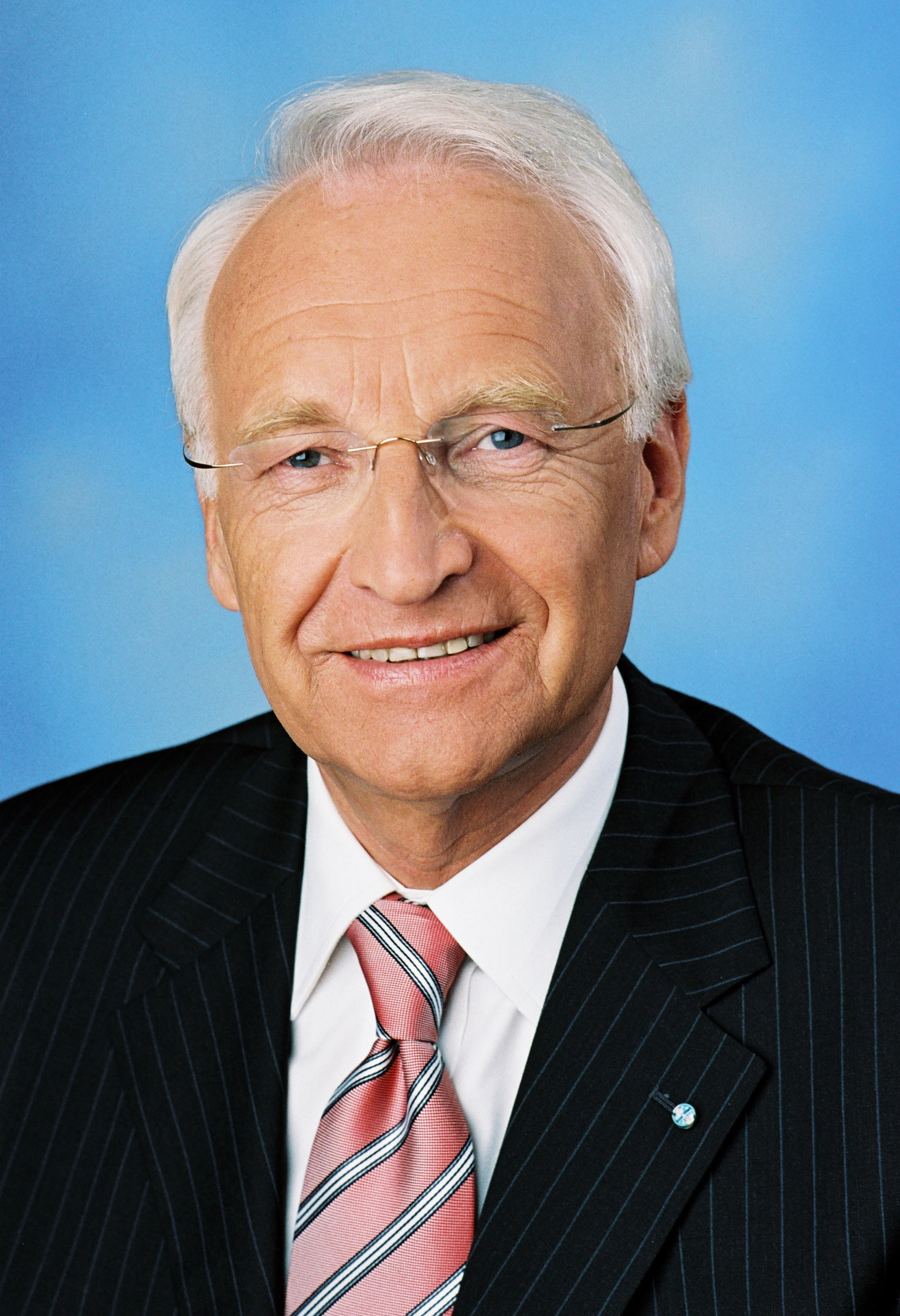

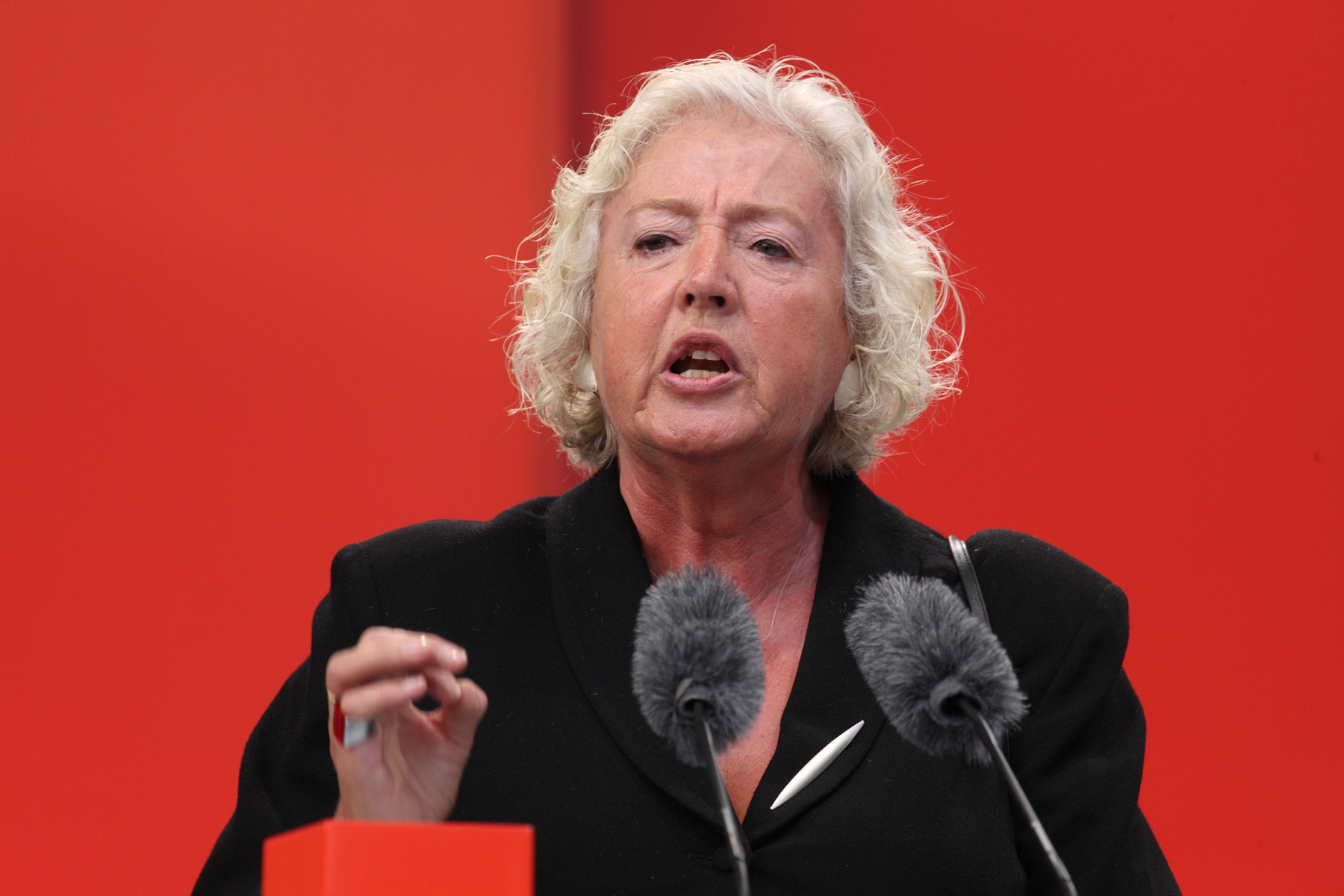
	First party	Second party	Third party
Leader	Edmund Stoiber	Renate Schmidt
Party	CSU	SPD	Greens
Last election	127 seats, 54.9%	58 seats, 26.0%	12 seats, 6.4%
Seats won	120	70	14
Seat change	▼7	▲12	▲2
Popular vote	6,163,888	3,506,620	713,732
Percentage	52.8%	30.0%	6.1%
Swing	▼2.1%	▲4.0%	▼0.3%
- Results for the single-member constituencies.
Minister-President before election
Edmund Stoiber
CSU
Elected Minister-President
Edmund Stoiber
CSU

The 1994 Bavarian state election was held on 25 September 1994 to elect the members of the 13th Landtag of Bavaria. The Christian Social Union (CSU) led by Minister-President Edmund Stoiber retained its majority with minor losses. The largest change in the election was the collapse of the Free Democratic Party (FDP), which lost all its seats.

== Parties ==
The table below lists parties represented in the 12th Landtag of Bavaria.

Name		Ideology	Leader(s)	1990 result	
Name		Ideology	Leader(s)	Votes (%)	Seats
CSU	Christian Social Union in Bavaria; Christlich-Soziale Union in Bayern	Christian democracy	Edmund Stoiber	54.9%	127 / 204
SPD	Social Democratic Party of Germany; Sozialdemokratische Partei Deutschlands	Social democracy	Renate Schmidt	26.0%	58 / 204
Grüne	Alliance 90/The Greens; Bündnis 90/Die Grünen	Green politics		6.4%	12 / 204
FDP	Free Democratic Party; Freie Demokratische Partei	Classical liberalism		5.2%	7 / 204

== Opinion polling ==
Polling firm	Fieldwork date	Sample size	CSU	SPD	Grüne	FDP	REP	Others	Lead
1994 state election	25 Sep 1994	–	52.8	30.0	6.1	2.8	3.9	4.3	22.8
Basisresearch	Jul 1993	1,002	52	28	6	4	–	?	24
Infratest	Feb 1993	1,002	39	29	9	6	11	6	10
Forsa	4–10 Dec 1992	1,034	45	28	8	?	12	?	17
1990 state election	14 Oct 1990	–	54.9	26.0	6.4	5.2	4.9	2.7	28.9

== Election result ==
Summary of the 25 September 1994 election results for the Landtag of Bavaria
Party	Votes	%	+/-	Seats	+/-	Seats %
Christian Social Union (CSU)	6,163,888	52.8	▼2.1	120	▼7	58.8
Social Democratic Party (SPD)	3,506,620	30.0	▲4.0	70	▲12	34.3
Alliance 90/The Greens (Grüne)	713,732	6.1	▼0.3	14	▲2	6.9
The Republicans (REP)	454,170	3.9	▼1.0	0	±0	0
Free Democratic Party (FDP)	327,305	2.8	▼2.4	0	▼7	0
Ecological Democratic Party (ÖDP)	248,983	2.1	▲0.4	0	±0	0
Bavaria Party (BP)	119,872	1.0	▲0.2	0	±0	0
Others	135,311	1.2		0	±0	0
Total	11,669,881	100.0		204	±0	
Voter turnout		67.8	▲1.9			

Popular vote
CSU	52.82%
SPD	30.05%
B'90/GRÜNE	6.12%
REP	3.89%
FDP	2.80%
Other	4.32%

Landtag seats
CSU	58.82%
SPD	34.31%
B'90/GRÜNE	6.86%

== Sources ==
- Bayerisches Landesamt für Statistik
