= 1986 Bavarian state election =

State election in Bavaria, Germany

- 12 October 1986

All 204 seats in the Landtag of Bavaria 103 seats needed for a majority
- Turnout: 11,354,241 (70.1%) ▼7.9%
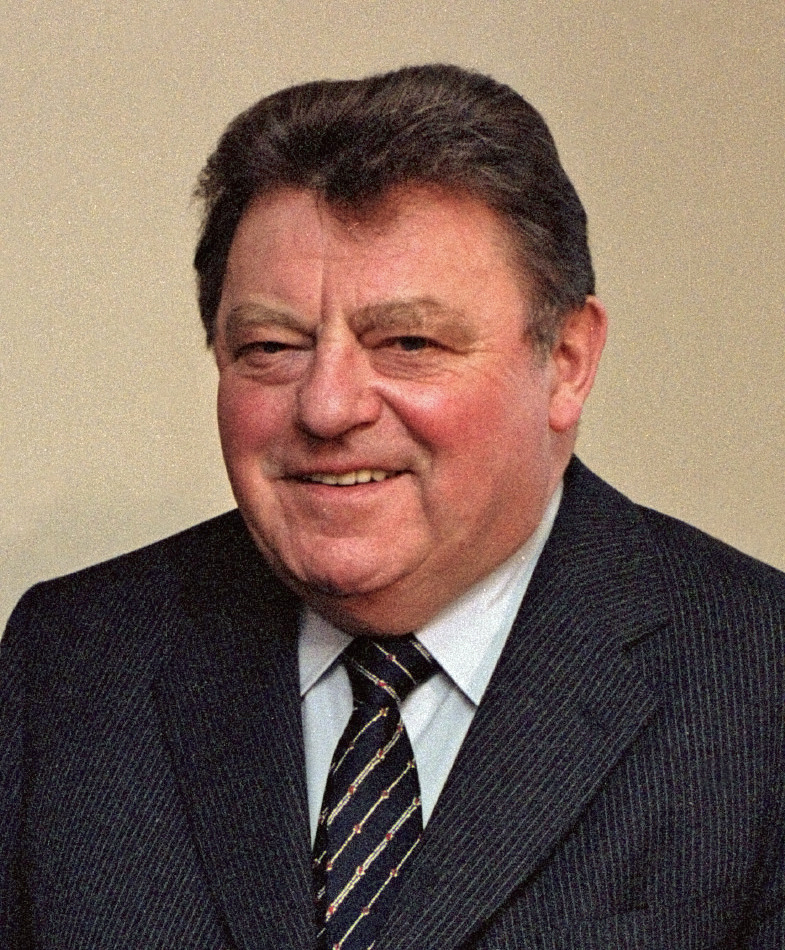

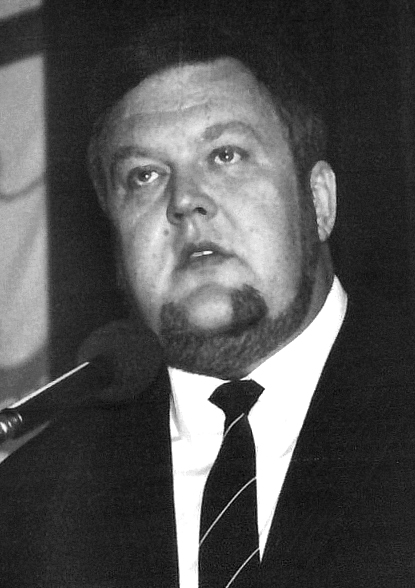
	First party	Second party
Leader	Franz Strauss	Karl-Heinz Hiersemann
Party	CSU	SPD
Last election	133 seats, 58.3%	71 seats, 31.9%
Seats won	128	61
Seat change	▼5	▼10
Popular vote	6,333,734	3,119,124
Percentage	55.8%	27.5%
Swing	▼2.5%	▼4.4%
	Third party
Party	Greens
Last election	0 seats, 4.6%
Seats won	15
Seat change	▲15
Popular vote	854,353
Percentage	7.5%
Swing	▲2.9%
- Results for the single-member constituencies.
Minister-President before election
Franz Strauss
CSU
Elected Minister-President
Franz Strauss
CSU

The 1986 Bavarian State Election was held on 12 October 1986 to elect members of the 11th Landtag of Bavaria. The Christian Social Union (CSU) led by Minister-President Franz Strauss retained its majority. The SPD fell below 30% of the vote for the first time since the 1954 state elections, while for the first time the Bavarian Greens won seats in the Landtag.

== Parties ==
The table below lists parties represented in the 10th Landtag of Bavaria.

Name		Ideology	Leader(s)	1982 result	
Name		Ideology	Leader(s)	Votes (%)	Seats
CSU	Christian Social Union in Bavaria; Christlich-Soziale Union in Bayern	Christian democracy	Franz Strauss	58.3%	133 / 204
SPD	Social Democratic Party of Germany; Sozialdemokratische Partei Deutschlands	Social democracy	Karl-Heinz Hiersemann	31.4%	71 / 204

== Election result ==
Summary of the 12 October 1986 election results for the Landtag of Bavaria
Party	Votes	%	+/-	Seats	+/-	Seats %
Christian Social Union (CSU)	6,333,734	55.8	▼2.5	128	▼5	62.7
Social Democratic Party (SPD)	3,119,124	27.5	▼4.4	61	▼10	28.4
The Greens (Grüne)	854,353	7.5	▲2.9	15	▲15	7.4
Free Democratic Party (FDP)	428,790	3.8	▲.3	0	±0	0
The Republicans (REP)	342,995	3.0	▲3.0	0	±0	0
Others	275,245	2.4		0	±0	0
Total	11,354,241	100.0		204	±0	
Voter turnout		70.1	▼7.9			
Source: Statistik Bayern and Historisches Lexikon Bayerns

Popular vote
CSU	55.8%
SPD	27.5%
GRÜNE	7.5%
FDP	3.8%
REP	3.0%
Other	2.4%

Landtag seats
CSU	62.7%
SPD	28.4%
GRÜNE	7.5%

== Sources ==
- Historisches Lexikon Bayerns
- Bayerisches Landesamt für Statistik
