= 1982 Bavarian state election =

State election in Bavaria, Germany

- 10 October 1982

All 204 seats in the Landtag of Bavaria 103 seats needed for a majority
- Turnout: 78.0% ▲1.4%
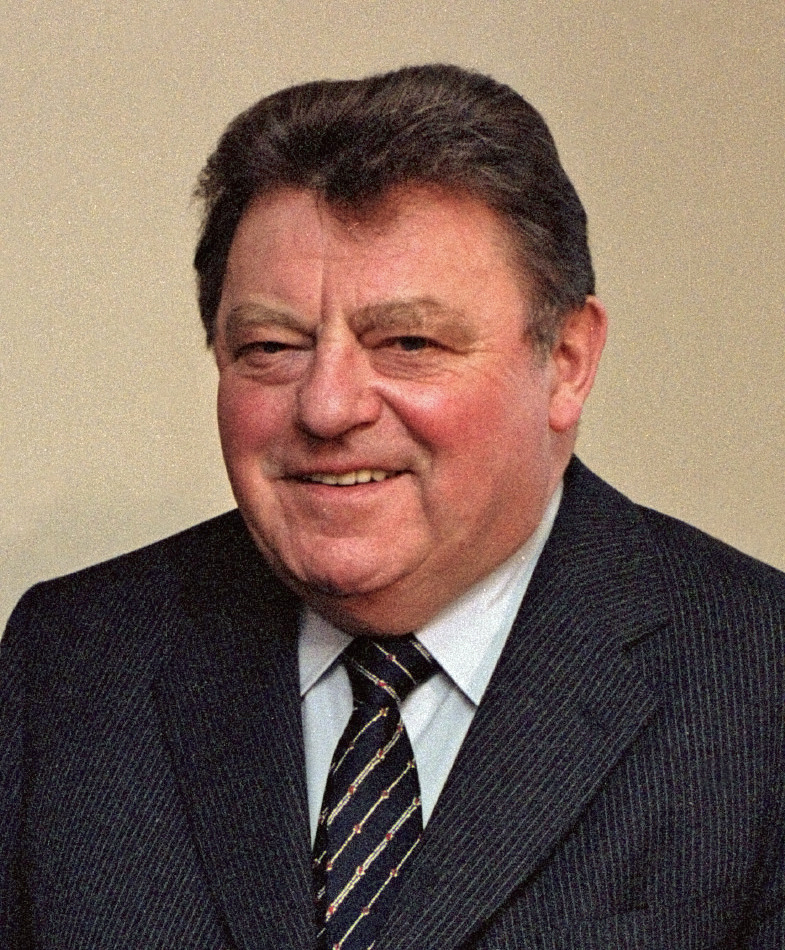

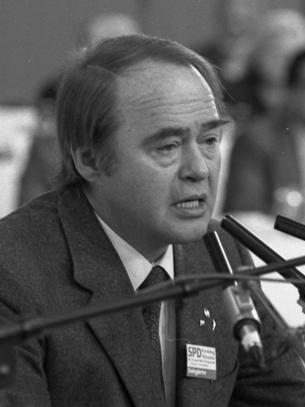

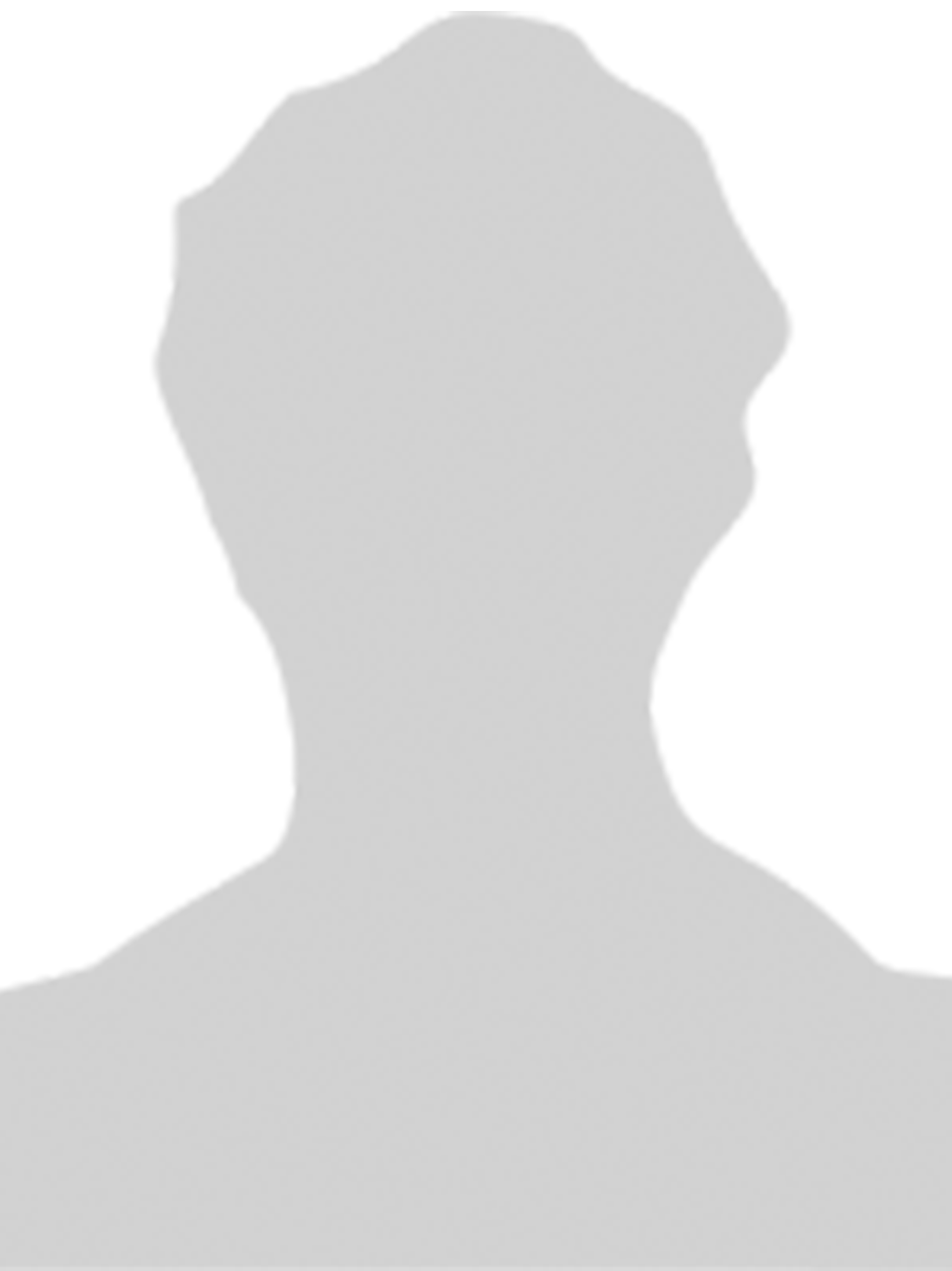
| | First party | Second party | Third party |
|---|---|---|---|
| Leader | Franz Josef Strauß | Helmut Rothemund |
| Party | CSU | SPD | FDP |
| Seats won | 133 | 71 | 0 |
| Seat change | ▲4 | ▲6 | ▼10 |
| Popular vote | 7,091,443 | 3,876,970 | 558,687 |
| Percentage | 58.3% | 31.9% | 3.5% |
| Swing | ▼0.8% | ▲0.5% | ▼2.7% |
Minister-President before election
Franz Josef Strauß
CSU
Elected Minister-President
Franz Josef Strauß
CSU

The 1982 Bavarian state election took place on 10 October 1982 to elect members of the Landtag of Bavaria. Voter turnout was 78.0%

== Background ==
In 1982, Bavaria had its first and, so far, only two-party parliament, consisting of the CSU and the SPD. The CSU missed a two-thirds majority by three seats. The FDP had been represented in the state parliament since 1946 (except from 1966 to 1970) and clearly failed to regain its seats this time, following the collapse of the social–liberal coalition at the federal level 3 weeks earlier.

This state election was the first Bavarian state election in which the Greens and the ÖDP (Ecological Democratic Party), which split from them, contested the election. Neither party managed to win seats in the state parliament. The ÖDP never achieved this again, unlike the Greens, who established themselves in the state parliament from the next election onwards.

For the CSU, Minister-president Franz Josef Strauss ran again as the top candidate and, as in the previous election, was challenged by the SPD state and parliamentary group chairman Helmut Rothemund.

Results of the state election of 10 October 1982
| Party | First votes | Second votes | Total votes | Total% | Seats |
|---|---|---|---|---|---|
| CSU | 3,557,068 | 3,534,375 | 7,091,443 | 58.28% | 133 |
| SPD | 1,985,057 | 1,891,913 | 3,876,970 | 31.86% | 71 |
| Grüne | 283,393 | 275,294 | 558,687 | 4.59% | – |
| FDP | 215,805 | 214,376 | 430,181 | 3.54% | – |
| NPD | 36,653 | 33,003 | 69,656 | 0.57% | – |
| BP | 35,400 | 30,484 | 65,884 | 0.54% | – |
| ÖDP | 17,186 | 27,575 | 44,761 | 0.37% | – |
| DKP | 11,048 | 10,822 | 21,870 | 0.18% | – |
| FP | 1,453 | 3,578 | 5,031 | 0.04% | – |
| C.B.V. | 338 | 858 | 1,196 | 0.01% | – |
| IWP | 73 | 1,036 | 1,109 | 0.01% | – |
| BWK | 62 | 361 | 423 | <0.01% | – |

After the election, the CSU formed a single-party government (Alleinregierung) under the leadership of Franz Josef Strauss (Strauss II cabinet), Rothemund remained Leader of the Opposition.

== See also ==
- List of members of the 10th Landtag of Bavaria
- Kabinett Strauß II
- State elections in Bavaria
