= SPD Bavaria =

- Chairperson: Ronja Endres; Florian von Brunn
- Founded: 26 June 1892; 134 years ago
- Ideology: Social democracy
- Political position: Centre-left
- National affiliation: Social Democratic Party of Germany
- Colours: Red
- Landtag of Bavaria: 17 / 203
- Bundestag delegation: 14 / 101

Website
- bayernspd.de

The SPD Bavaria (SPD Bayern, own spelling BayernSPD), full name Sozialdemokratische Partei Deutschlands (SPD), Landesverband Bayern [Social Democratic Party of Germany (SPD), State Association of Bavaria], is the Bavarian State Association of the Social Democratic Party of Germany. In 2022, it was the second largest state association of a party in Bavaria with 52,000 members.

The party's co-chairs are Ronja Endres and Florian von Brunn.

== History ==
The SPD Bavaria has a rich history, which dates back to 1866, when a workers' education club in Nuremberg was founded as the first Social Democratic institution. In 1881, Karl Grillenberger won the first Reichstag mandate for the SPD in Bavaria, also in Nuremberg. 1887 the SPD (still not under this name) in the Kingdom of Bavaria joined for the first time the election to the Chamber of Deputies of the Kingdom, and received 2.1 percent of the vote, but no seat. In 1888, the Social Democratic newspaper Münchener Post was founded.

The history of the SPD Bayern as a separate organization began with the first party conference of the SPD in Bavaria, which met on the initiative of Georg von Vollmar in 1892 in Reinhausen near Regensburg. The party congress decided that the SPD would take part in the state elections in 1893 and passed an election program.

== Chairpeople ==
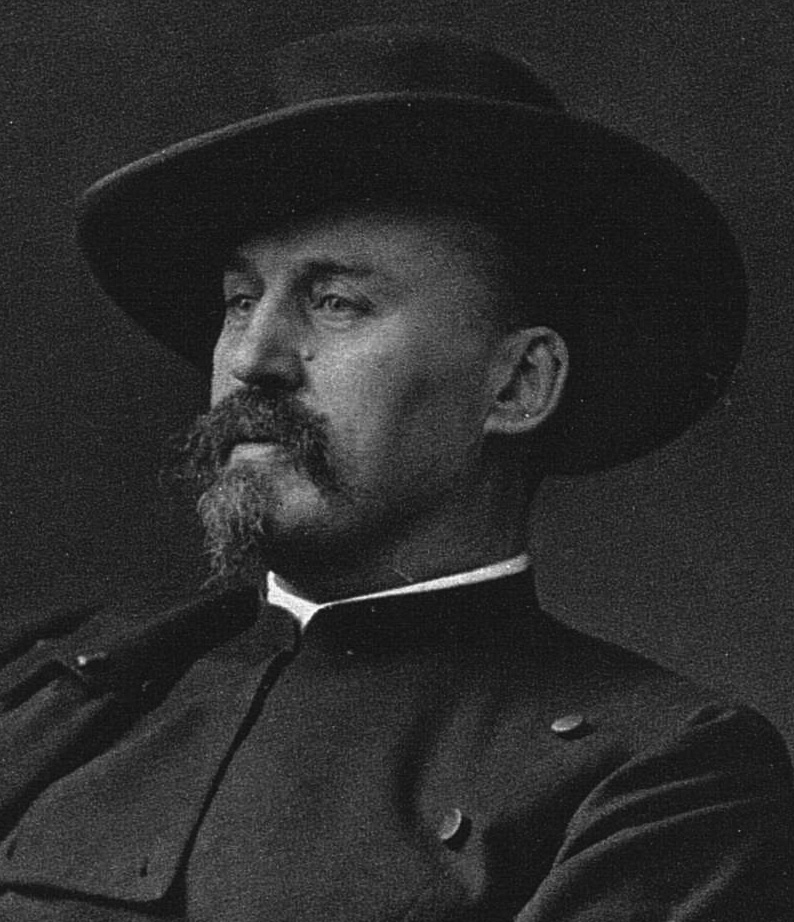
Georg von Vollmar, first chairman of SPD Bavaria

Period	Chairperson
1892–1918	Georg von Vollmar
1918–1933	Erhard Auer
1946–1947	Lisa Albrecht
1946–1947	Wilhelm Hoegner
1947–1963	Waldemar von Knoeringen
1963–1972	Volkmar Gabert
1972–1977	Hans-Jochen Vogel
1977–1985	Helmut Rothemund
1985–1991	Rudolf Schöfberger
1991–2000	Renate Schmidt
2000–2003	Wolfgang Hoderlein
2003–2009	Ludwig Stiegler
2009–2017	Florian Pronold
2017–2021	Natascha Kohnen
2021–	Ronja Endres; Florian von Brunn

== Election results ==
=== Landtag of Bavaria ===
Election	Popular Vote		Seats	+/–	Government
Election	Votes	%	Seats	+/–	Government
1946	871,760	28.6 (#2)	54 / 180		CSU-SPD
1950	2,588,549	28.0 (#1)	63 / 204	▲9	SPD-CSU
1954	2,733,946	28.1 (#2)	61 / 204	▼2	SPD-BP-BHE-FDP (1954–57)
1954	2,733,946	28.1 (#2)	61 / 204	▼2	Opposition (1957–58)
1958	2,839,300	30.8 (#2)	64 / 204	▲3	Opposition
1962	3,465,168	35.3 (#2)	79 / 204	▲15	Opposition
1966	3,768,973	35.8 (#2)	79 / 204	0	Opposition
1970	3,742,760	33.3 (#2)	70 / 204	▼9	Opposition
1974	3,409,126	30.2 (#2)	64 / 204	▼6	Opposition
1978	3,599,479	31.4 (#2)	65 / 204	▲1	Opposition
1982	3,876,970	31.9 (#2)	71 / 204	▲6	Opposition
1986	3,119,124	27.5 (#2)	61 / 204	▼10	Opposition
1990	2,882,008	26.0 (#2)	58 / 204	▼3	Opposition
1994	3,506,620	30.0 (#2)	70 / 204	▲12	Opposition
1998	3,501,900	28.7 (#2)	67 / 204	▼3	Opposition
2003	2,012,265	19.6 (#2)	41 / 180	▼26	Opposition
2008	1,972,437	18.6 (#2)	39 / 187	▼2	Opposition
2013	2,437,401	20.6 (#2)	42 / 180	▲3	Opposition
2018	1,309,078	9.7 (#5)	22 / 205	▼20	Opposition
2023	1,140,753	8.4 (#5)	17 / 203	▼5	Opposition
