= 1978 Bavarian state election =

- 15 October 1978

All 204 seats in the Landtag of Bavaria 103 seats needed for a majority
- Turnout: 11,468,095 (76.6%) ▼1.0%
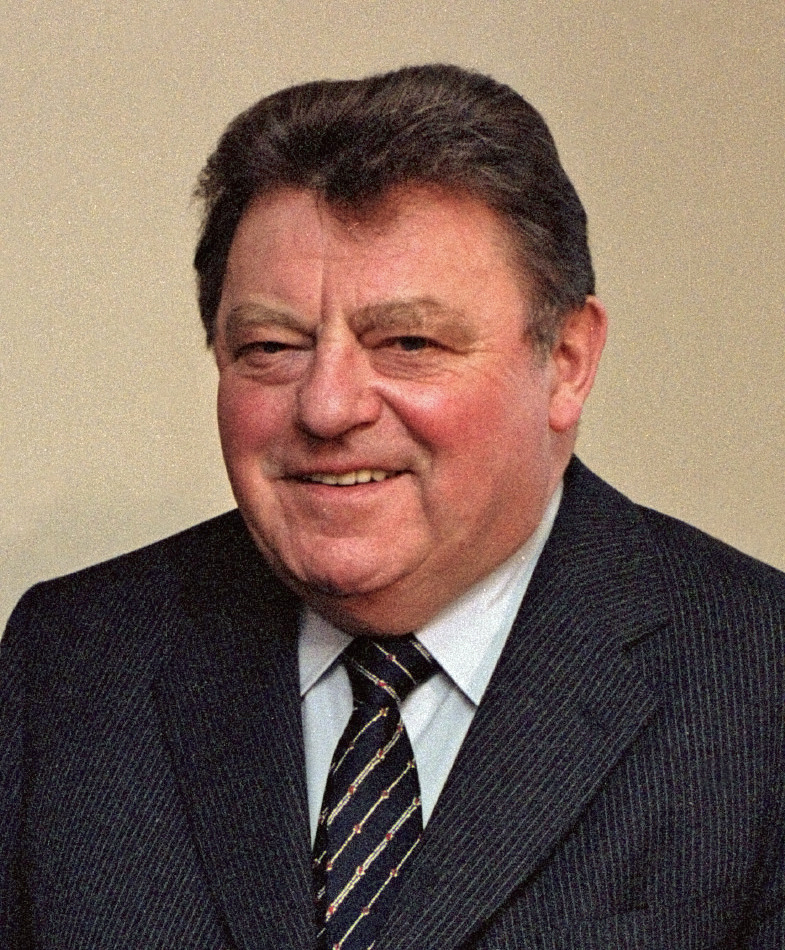

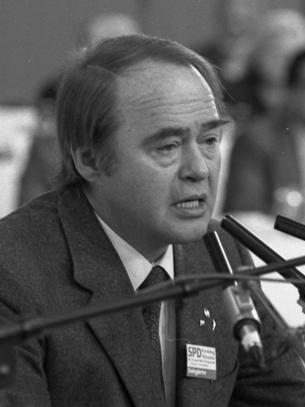
	First party	Second party
Leader	Franz Strauss	Helmut Rothemund
Party	CSU	SPD
Last election	132 seats, 62.1%	64 seats, 30.2%
Seats won	129	65
Seat change	▼3	▲1
Popular vote	6,782,091	3,599,479
Percentage	59.1%	31.4%
Swing	▼3.0%	▲1.2%
	Third party
Party	FDP
Last election	8 seats, 5.2%
Seats won	10
Seat change	▲2
Popular vote	711,348
Percentage	6.2%
Swing	▲1.0%
- Results for the single-member constituencies.
Minister-President before election
Alfons Goppel
CSU
Elected Minister-President
Franz Strauss
CSU

Alfons Goppel (CSU) had already announced before the election that he would not run for another term as Bavarian Minister-President after 16 years of service. The CSU chairman Franz Josef Strauss, the then economic and fiscal spokesman of the CDU/CSU faction in the Bundestag, therefore took over the top candidacy and thus ran to be Goppel's successor.

Helmut Rothemund, who took over the state presidency of Hans-Jochen Vogel in 1977, was the first member of the SPD.

After the election, the CSU formed a government under the leadership of Strauss.

== Election result ==
Summary of the 10 October 1982 election results for the Landtag of Bavaria
Party	Votes	%	+/-	Seats	+/-	Seats %
Christian Social Union (CSU)	6,782,091	59.1%	▼3.0%	129	▼3	63.2%
Social Democratic Party (SPD)	3,599,479	31.4%	▲1.2%	65	▲1	31.9%
Free Democratic Party (FDP)	711,348	6.2%	▲1.0%	10	▲2	4.9%
AUD-GAZ (AUD)	210,977	1.8%	▲1.8%	0	±0	0
National Democratic Party (NPD)	66,926	0.6%	▼0.5%	0	±0	0
Bavaria Party (BP)	50,004	0.4%	▼0.4%	0	±0	0
German Communist Party (DKP)	33,182	0.3%	▼0.1%	0	±0	0
Others	14,088	0.1%		0	±0	0
Total	11,468,095	100%		204	±0	
Voter turnout		76.6%	▼1.1%			
Source: Statistik Bayern

Popular vote
CSU	59.1%
SPD	31.4%
FDP	6.2%
AUD-GAZ	1.8%
NPD	0.6%
Other	0.8%

Landtag seats
CSU	63.2%
SPD	31.9%
FDP	4.9%

== Sources ==
- Bayerisches Landesamt für Statistik
