= Helmut Rothemund =

German politician (1929–2004)

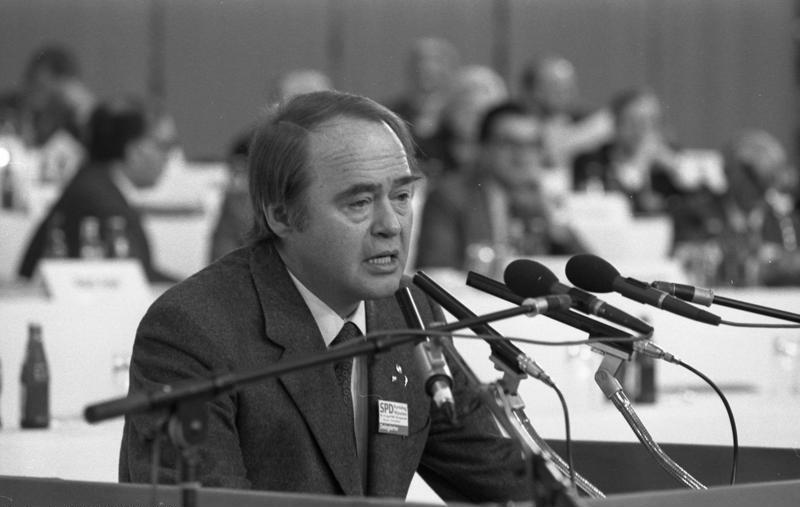
- Helmut Rothemund in 1982

Member of the Landtag of Bavaria
- In office 1962–1992

Personal details
- Born: 31 March 1929 Rehau, Upper Franconia, Bavaria
- Died: 27 June 2004 (aged 75) Munich, Bavaria, Germany
- Party: Social Democratic

Helmut Rothemund (31 March 1929 – 27 June 2004) was a German politician of the Social Democratic Party (SPD).

== Biography ==
Rothemund was born in 1929, the son of a porcelain painter. He was drafted into military service in 1945. After a brief period as a prisoner of war, he graduated from high school in 1948.

He completed his law studies in Erlangen in 1954, earning his doctorate in law (Dr. iur.). In 1956, he took a position at the Bavarian State Ministry of Justice. That same year, he was the lead candidate for the SPD in the district council elections, and in 1958, he became the youngest district administrator in Bavaria at the time, winning the district administrator election in the Rehau district (now part of the Hof district).

Rothemund was a member of the Landtag of Bavaria from 1962 to 1992. From 1970 to 1976 and from 1986 to 1992, he served as Vice President of the Parliament. During this time, he chaired the SPD parliamentary group. In 1977, he succeeded Hans-Jochen Vogel as Chairman of the SPD Bavaria, a position he held until 1985. Rothemund was his party's lead candidate in the 1978 and 1982Bavarian state elections. From 1989 to 1998, he succeeded Volkmar Gabert as Chairman of the Georg-von-Vollmar-Akademie.

== Awards ==
- 1973: Verdienstkreuz am Bande der Bundesrepublik Deutschland
- Großes Verdienstkreuz (1978), mit Stern (1983)
- Bayerische Verfassungsmedaille (1984)
