= Cabinet Strauss I =

State government of Bavaria, Germany (1978–1982)

First Cabinet of Franz Josef Strauss Cabinet Strauss- I
- 14th Cabinet of Bavaria
- 6 November 1978 – 27 October 1982
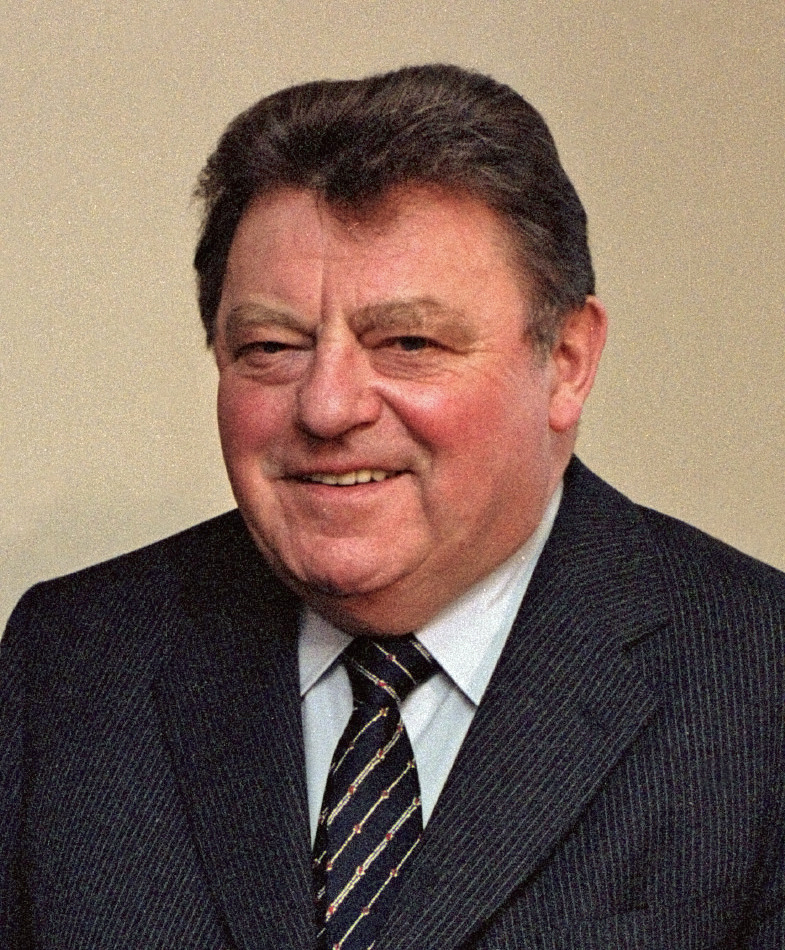
- Date formed: 6 November 1978
- Date dissolved: 27 October 1982 (3 years, 11 months and 3 weeks)

People and organisations
- Minister President: Franz Josef Strauss
- Deputy Minister President: Karl Hillermeier
- Member party: Christian Social Union
- Opposition party: Social Democratic Party; Free Democratic Party

History
- Election: 1978 Bavarian state election
- Legislature term: 9th Landtag
- Predecessor: Goppel IV
- Successor: Strauss II

The Cabinet Strauss I (German: Kabinett Strauß I) was the state government of the German state of Bavaria from 6 November 1978 to 27 October 1982. The Cabinet was headed by Minister President Horst Seehofer and was formed by a coalition of the Christian Social Union. It was replaced by the Cabinet Strauss II.

== Composition ==
Cabinet members
Portfolio	Minister	Took office	Left office	Party
Minister President	Franz Josef Strauß	6 November 1978	27 October 1982	CSU
Deputy Minister President & Minister of Justice	Karl Hillermeier	6 November 1978	27 October 1982	CSU
Minister of Interior	Gerold Tandler	6 November 1978	27 October 1982	CSU
Minister of Finance	Max Streibl	6 November 1978	27 October 1982	CSU
Minister of Economics and Transport	Anton Jaumann	6 November 1978	27 October 1982	CSU
Minister of Food, Agriculture and Forestry	Hans Eisenmann	6 November 1978	27 October 1982	CSU
Minister of Regional Development and Environmental Issues	Alfred Dick	6 November 1978	27 October 1982	CSU
Minister of Education and Culture	Hans Maier	6 November 1978	27 October 1982	CSU
Minister of Labor and Social Affairs Families, and Women	Fritz Pirkl	6 November 1978	27 October 1982	CSU
Minister of Federal Affairs	Peter Schmidhuber	6 November 1978	27 October 1982	CSU
