= Strauss II cabinet =

Second Cabinet of Franz Josef Strauss Cabinet Strauss II
- 15th Cabinet of Bavaria
- 27 October 1982 – 30 October 1986
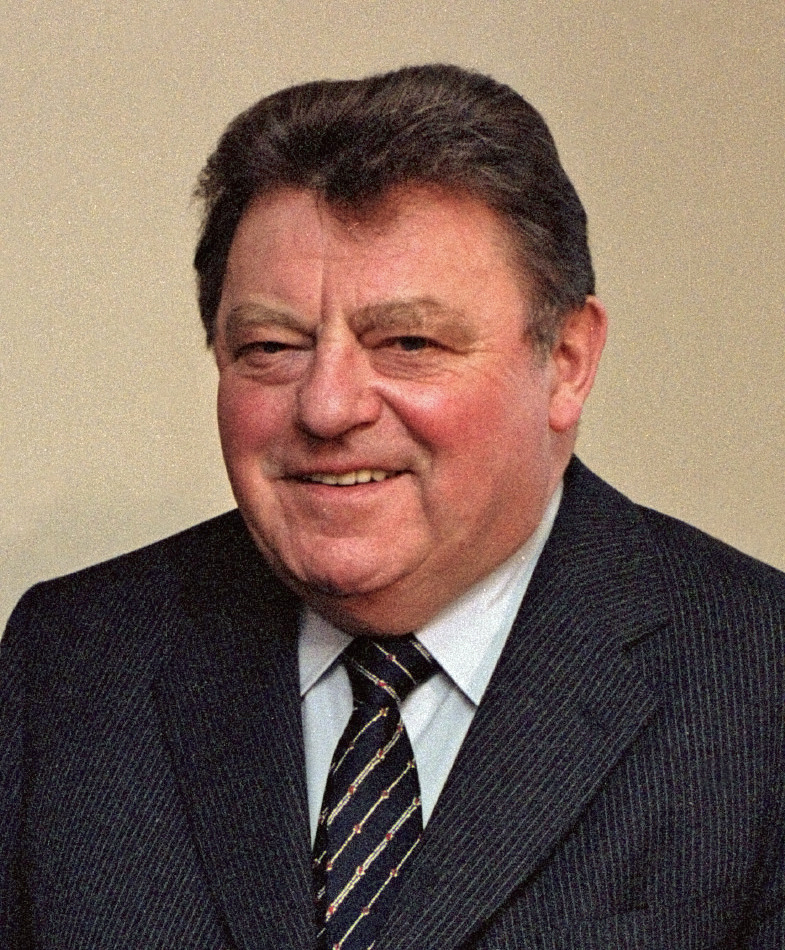
- Date formed: 27 October 1982
- Date dissolved: 30 October 1986 (4 years and 3 days)

People and organisations
- Minister President: Franz Josef Strauss
- Deputy Minister President: Karl Hillermeier
- Member party: Christian Social Union
- Opposition party: Social Democratic Party

History
- Election: 1982 Bavarian state election
- Legislature term: 10th Landtag
- Predecessor: Strauss I
- Successor: Strauss III

The Cabinet Strauss II (German: Kabinett Strauß II) was the state government of the German state of Bavaria from 27 October 1982 to 30 October 1986. The Cabinet was headed by Minister President Franz Josef Strauss and was formed by the Christian Social Union. It was replaced by the Cabinet Strauss III.

== Composition ==
Cabinet members
Portfolio	Minister	Took office	Left office	Party
Minister President	Franz Josef Strauß	27 October 1982	30 October 1986	CSU
Deputy Minister President & Minister of Interior	Karl Hillermeier	27 October 1982	30 October 1986	CSU
Minister of Justice	August Richard Lang	27 October 1982	30 October 1986	CSU
Minister of Finance	Max Streibl	27 October 1982	30 October 1986	CSU
Minister of Economics and Transport	Anton Jaumann	27 October 1982	30 October 1986	CSU
Minister of Food, Agriculture and Forestry	Hans Eisenmann	27 October 1982	30 October 1986	CSU
Minister of Regional Development and Environmental Issues	Alfred Dick	27 October 1982	30 October 1986	CSU
Minister of Education and Culture	Hans Maier	27 October 1982	30 October 1986	CSU
Minister of Labor and Social Affairs	Fritz Pirkl	27 October 1982	30 October 1986	CSU
Minister of Federal Affairs	Peter Schmidhuber	27 October 1982	30 October 1986	CSU
