= 1970 Bavarian state election =

State election in Bavaria, Germany

- 22 November 1970

All 204 seats in the Landtag of Bavaria 103 seats needed for a majority
- Turnout: 79.5 % ▲3.0%
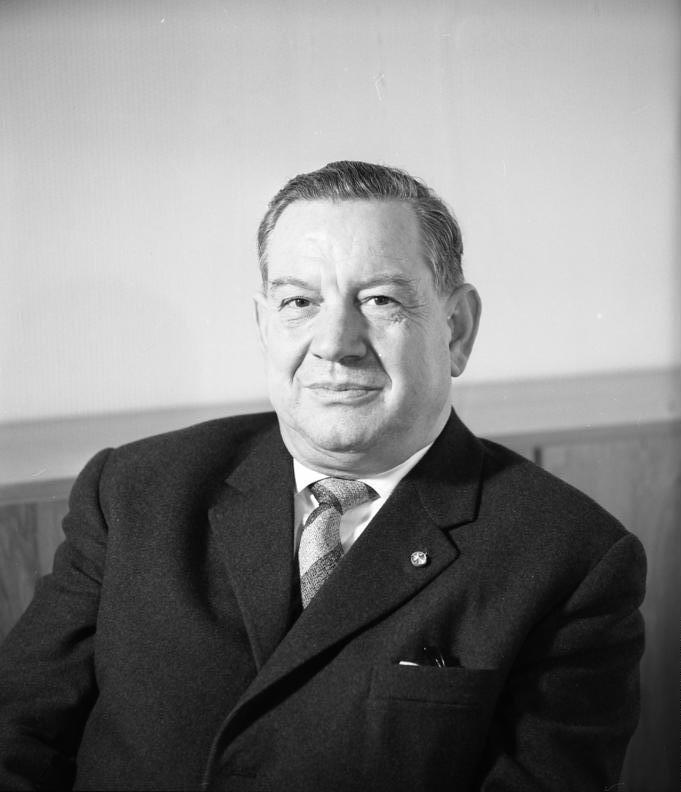

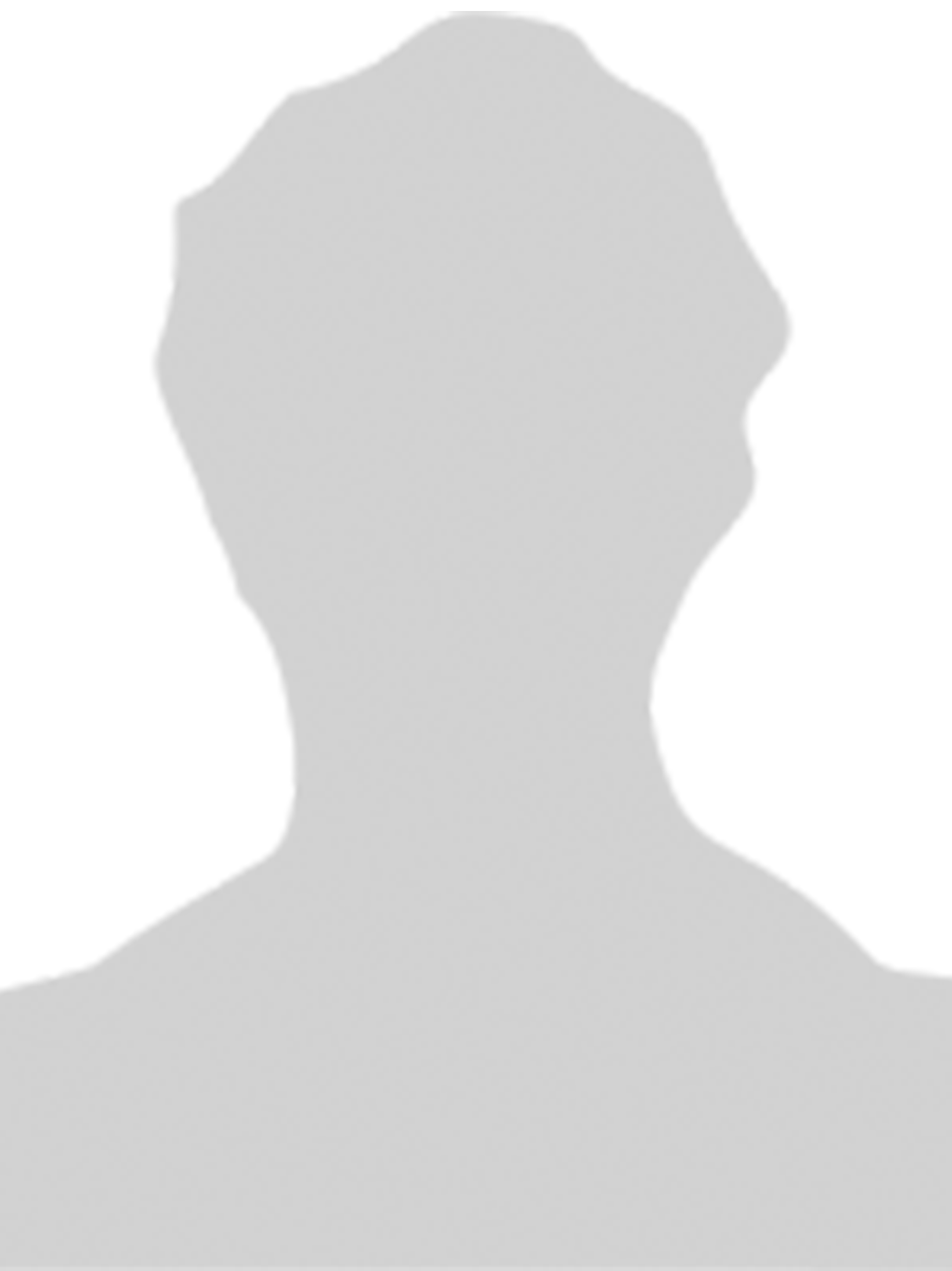

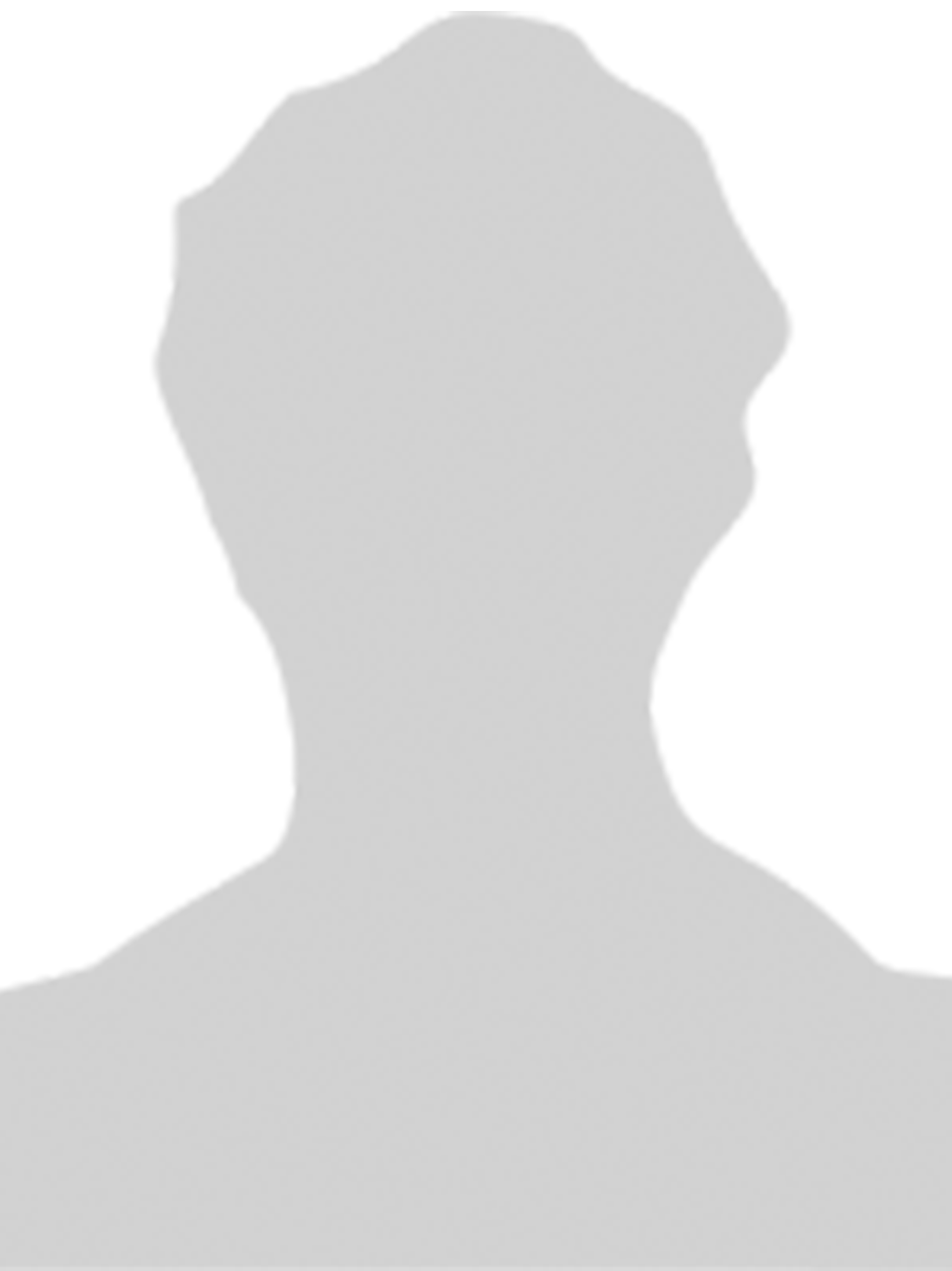
	First party	Second party	Third party
Leader	Alfons Goppel	Volkmar Gabert
Party	CSU	SPD	FDP
Seats won	124	70	10
Seat change	▲16	▼9	▲10
Popular vote	6,344,599	3,742,760	624,560
Percentage	56.4%	33.3%	5.6%
Swing	▲8.3%	▼2.0%	▲0.5%
Minister-President before election
Alfons Goppel
CSU
Elected Minister-President
Alfons Goppel
CSU

The 1970 Bavarian state election took place on 22 November 1970 to elect members of the Landtag of Bavaria. Voter turnout was 79.5%. In the run-up to the state election, a constitutional amendment lowered the voting age from 21 to 18 and the passive voting age from 25 to 21.

== Background ==
A ten percent electoral threshold applied at the district level, meaning that a party had to achieve ten percent of the valid votes in at least one of the districts to enter the state parliament.

== Results ==
This was the first state election since 1946 in which the CSU received more than 50% of the vote. They achieved this again in the following eight state elections from 1974 to 2003. The FDP returned to the state parliament.

The SPD parliamentary group leader Volkmar Gabert failed for the third time in his goal of replacing Minister-President Alfons Goppel in this election.

Results of the state election of 22 November 1970
Party	First votes	Second votes	Total votes	Total%	Seats
CSU	3,205,170	3,139,429	6,344,599	56.43%	124
SPD	1,929,358	1,813,402	3,742,760	33.29%	70
FDP	297,847	326,713	624,560	5.56%	10
NPD	167,801	157,845	325,646	2.90%	–
BP	79,675	67,706	147,381	1.31%	–
DKP	16,343	23,912	40,255	0.36%	–
EFP	8,372	9,534	17,906	0.16%	–

After the election, the CSU formed a single-party government (Alleinregierung) under the leadership of Alfons Goppel (Third Goppel cabinet).

== See also ==
- List of members of the 7th Landtag of Bavaria
- Third Goppel cabinet
- State elections in Bavaria
