= 1966 Bavarian state election =

State election in Bavaria, Germany

- 20 November 1966

All 204 seats in the Landtag of Bavaria 103 seats needed for a majority
- Turnout: 80.6 ▲4.1%
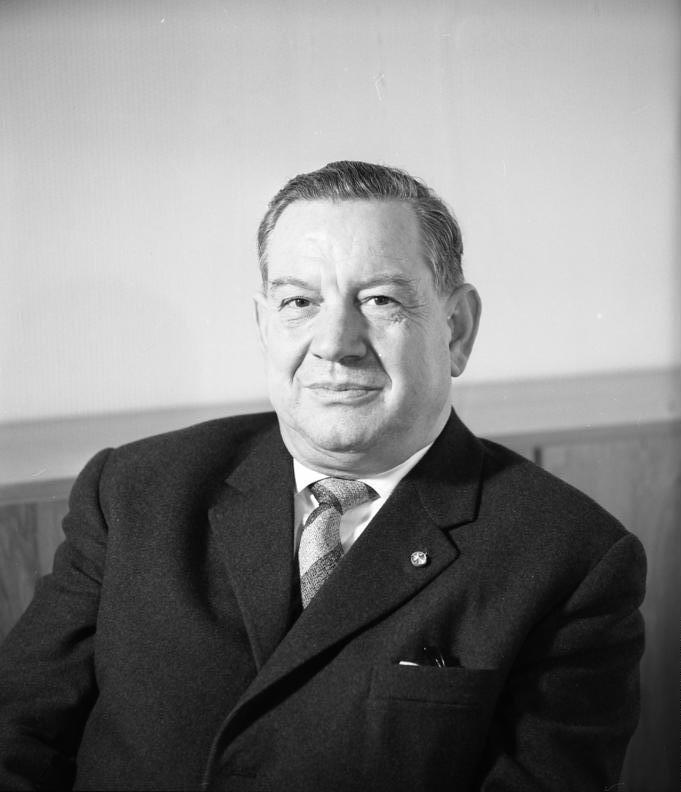

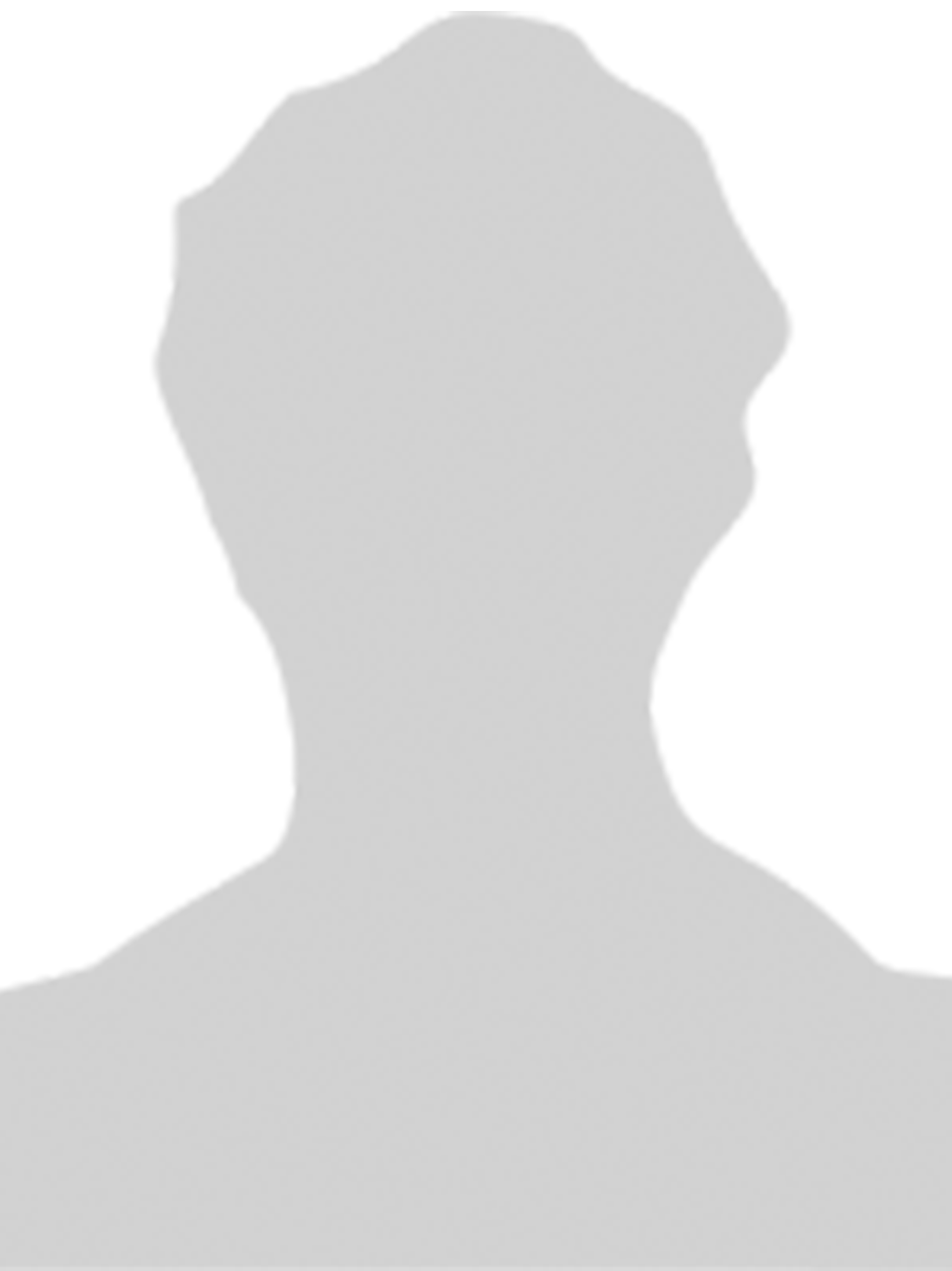

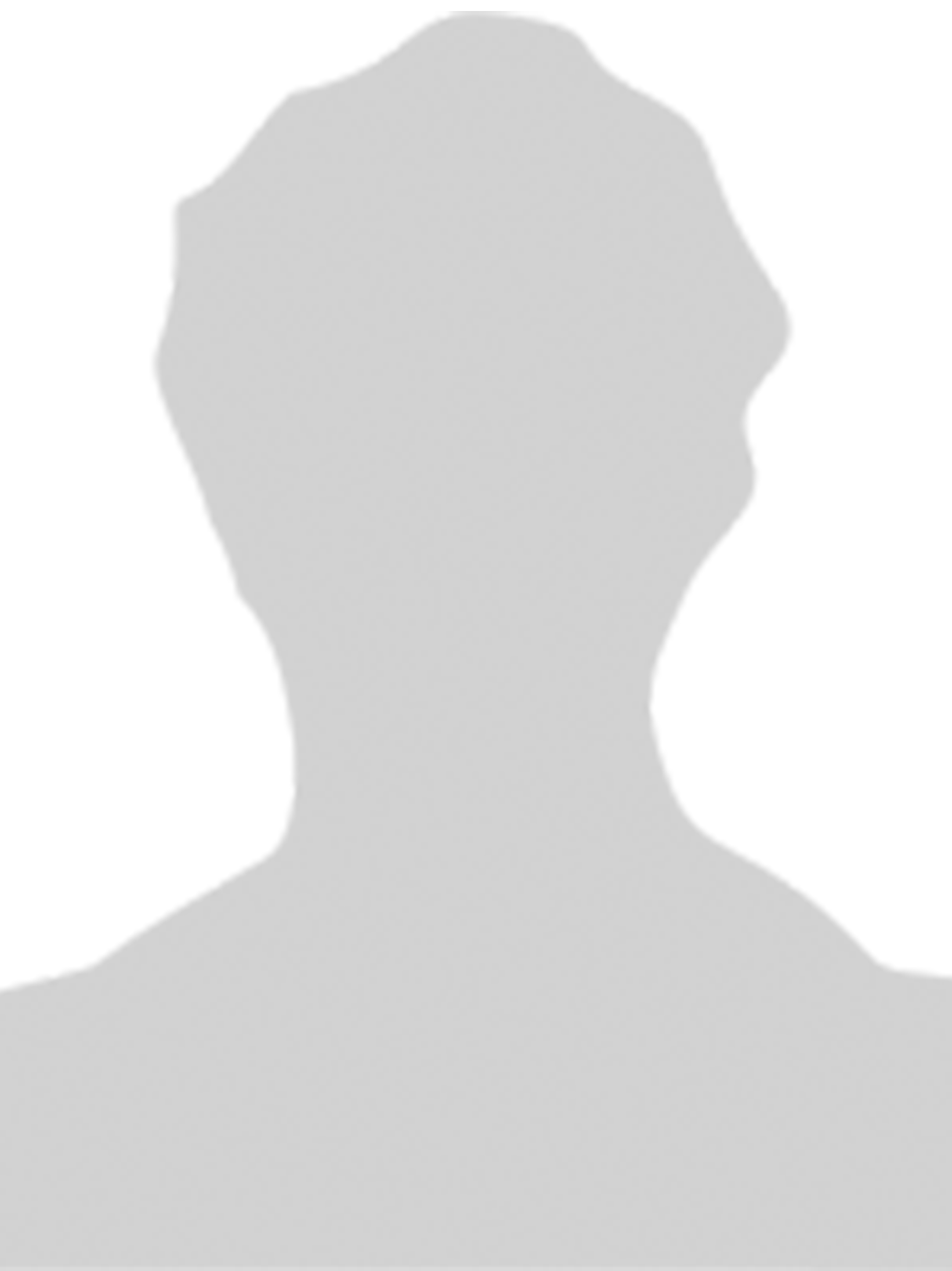
| | First party | Second party | Third party |
|---|---|---|---|
| Leader | Alfons Goppel | Volkmar Gabert | Siegfried Pöhlmann |
| Party | CSU | SPD | NPD |
| Seats won | 110 | 79 | 15 |
| Seat change | ▲2 | Steady | ▲15 |
| Popular vote | 5,074,342 | 3,768,973 | 781,813 |
| Percentage | 48.1% | 35.8% | 7.4% |
| Swing | ▲0.6% | ▲0.5% | ▲7.3% |
Minister-President before election
Alfons Goppel
CSU-BP
Elected Minister-President
Alfons Goppel
CSU-BP

The 1966 Bavarian state election took place on 20 November 1966 to elect members of the Landtag of Bavaria. Voter turnout was 80.6%.

== Background ==
A 10% electoral threshold applied at the district level, meaning that a party had to achieve 10% of the valid votes in at least one district to enter the state parliament.

As in the 1962 election, Prime Minister Alfons Goppel (CSU) and the SPD parliamentary group leader Volkmar Gabert again applied for the office of minister-president of Bavaria.

== Results ==
Although the SPD achieved its best result to date in a Bavarian state election with 35.8%, it could not prevent the CSU from defending its absolute majority of seats.

In this election, the NPD entered the Landtag of Bavaria for the first and only time. It garnered 12.3% of the vote in the administrative district of Middle Franconia. The Bavaria Party and the FDP failed to enter the Landtag for the first time. The FDP, in its stronghold of Middle Franconia where it had always surpassed the 10% threshold, only managed 9.0%. The Bavaria Party fell to 7.3% of the vote in its strongest district, Lower Bavaria.

The CSU therefore formed a single-party government (Alleinregierung) under the leadership of Alfons Goppel (Second Goppel cabinet).

Results of the state election of November 20, 1966
| Party | First votes | Second votes | Total votes | Total % | Seats |
|---|---|---|---|---|---|
| CSU | 2,549,610 | 2,524,732 | 5.074,342 | 48.14% | 110 |
| SPD | 1,939,685 | 1,829,288 | 3.768,973 | 35.76% | 79 |
| NPD | 402,228 | 379,585 | 781,813 | 7.42% | 15 |
| FDP | 258,646 | 280,485 | 539,131 | 5.11% | — |
| BP | 189,399 | 171,773 | 361,172 | 3.43% | — |
| GDP | 7,302 | 7,947 | 15,249 | 0.14% | — |

== See also ==
- List of members of the 6th Landtag of Bavaria
- Second Goppel cabinet
- State elections in Bavaria
