= Alfred Dick =

Alfred Dick may refer to:

- Alfred Dick (politician) (1927–2005), German politician and school teacher
- Alfred Dick (entrepreneur) (1865–1909), Swiss sports executive and entrepreneur
