= Tobias Reiß =

German politician (born 1968)

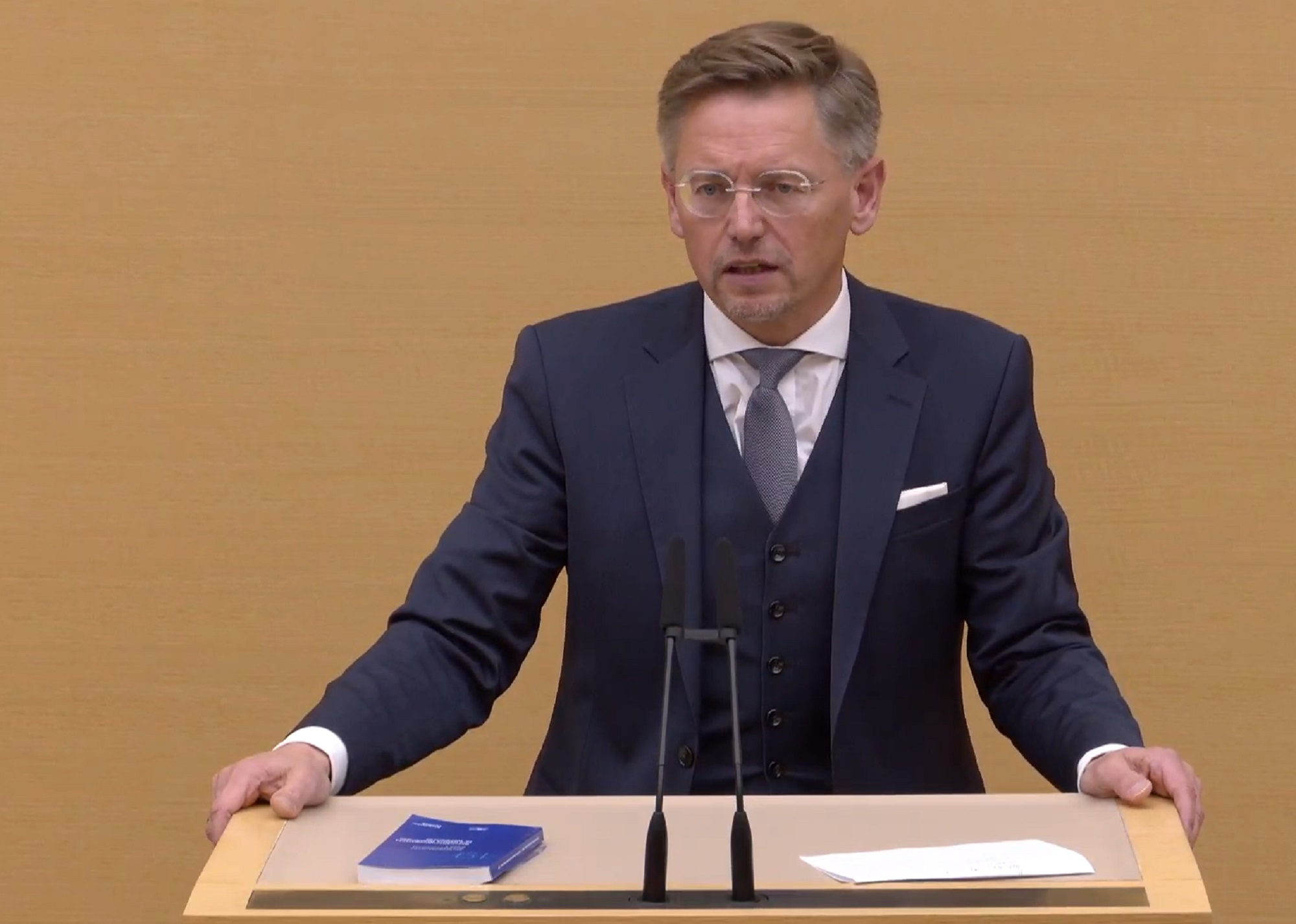
- Reiß in 2023

Member of the Landtag of Bavaria
- Incumbent
- Assumed office 20 October 2008
- Preceded by: Herbert Rubenbauer
- Constituency: Tirschenreuth

Personal details
- Born: 23 August 1968 (age 57)
- Party: Christian Social Union

Tobias Reiß (born 23 August 1968) is a German politician serving as a member of the Landtag of Bavaria since 2008. He has served as vice president of the Landtag since 2023.
