= 1974 Bavarian state election =

State election in Bavaria, Germany

- 27 October 1974

All 204 seats in the Landtag of Bavaria 103 seats needed for a majority
- Turnout: 77.7% ▼1.8%
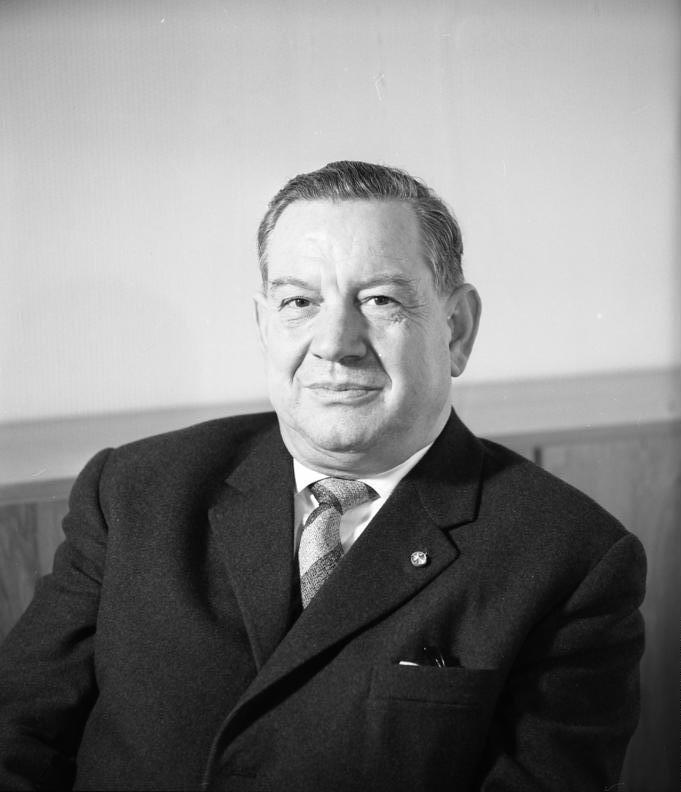

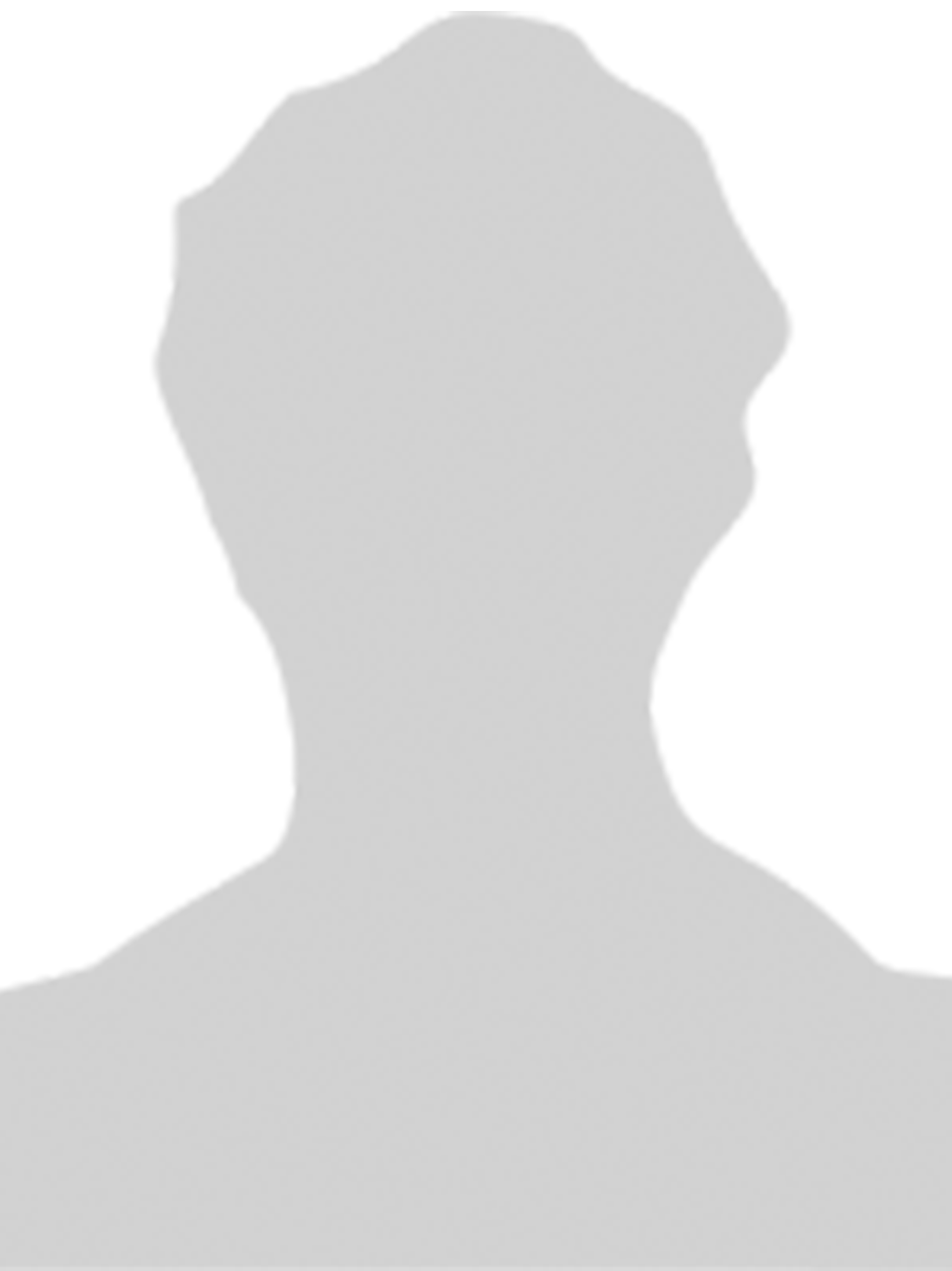

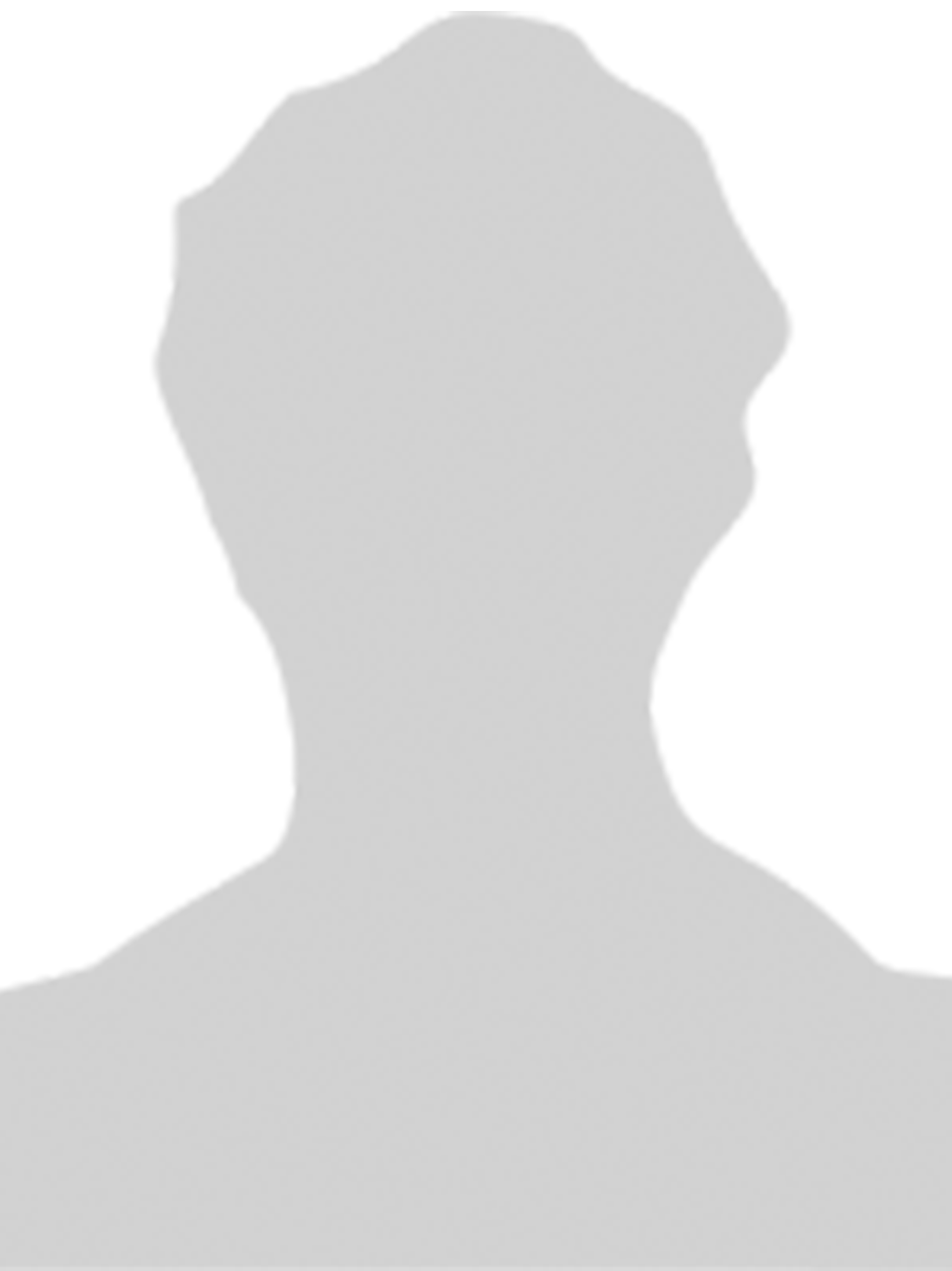
	First party	Second party	Third party
Leader	Alfons Goppel
Party	CSU	SPD	FDP
Seats won	132	64	8
Seat change	▲8	▼6	▼2
Popular vote	7,001,551	3,409,126	586,533
Percentage	62.1%	30.2%	5.2%
Swing	▲5.7%	▼3.1%	▼0.4%
Minister-President before election
Alfons Goppel
CSU
Elected Minister-President
Alfons Goppel
CSU

The 1974 Bavarian state election took place on 27 October 1974 to elect members of the Landtag of Bavaria. Voter turnout was 77.7%. Prior to the election, a constitutional amendment referendum had allowed for new electoral district boundaries and introduced a state-wide five percent electoral threshold.

== Result ==
The CSU achieved its best result in a state election to date in this election, which was also the best result ever achieved by a party in Bavaria. It was only four seats short of a two-thirds majority in parliament. This state election marked the first time the five percent threshold was applied in Bavaria. The FDP narrowly cleared it, meaning that three parties – the CSU, SPD, and FDP – were represented in the state parliament.

Result of the state election of 27 October 1974
Party	First votes	Second votes	Total votes	Total%	Seats
CSU	3,520,065	3,481,486	7,001,551	62.08%	132
SPD	1,739,245	1,669,881	3,409,126	30.23%	64
FDP	297,281	289,252	586,533	5.20%	8
NPD	63,581	58,164	121,745	1.08%	–
BP	47,211	40,224	87,435	0.78%	–
DKP	24,834	21,056	45,890	0.41%	–
BSP	11,602	7,903	19,505	0.17%	–
KPD (AO)	680	6,121	6,801	0.06%	–

After the election, the CSU formed a single-party government (Alleinregierung) under the leadership of Alfons Goppel (Fourth Goppel cabinet).

Goppel's challenger, federal minister of justice Hans-Jochen Vogel (SPD), declined a move to state politics and remained in the cabinet of federal chancellor Helmut Schmidt.

== See also ==
- List of members of the 8th Landtag of Bavaria
- Fourth Goppel cabinet
- State elections in Bavaria
