= Hans Eisenmann =

German politician

Hans Eisenmann (April 15, 1923 - August 31, 1987) was a German politician, representative of the Christian Social Union of Bavaria.

He was a member of the Landtag of Bavaria in the 1950s. From 1969 until his death he was Bavarian State Minister for Agriculture and Forestry.

== See also ==
- List of Bavarian Christian Social Union politicians
