= 1962 Bavarian state election =

State election in Bavaria, Germany

- 25 November 1962

All 204 seats in the Landtag of Bavaria 103 seats needed for a majority
- Turnout: 76.5% ▼0.1%
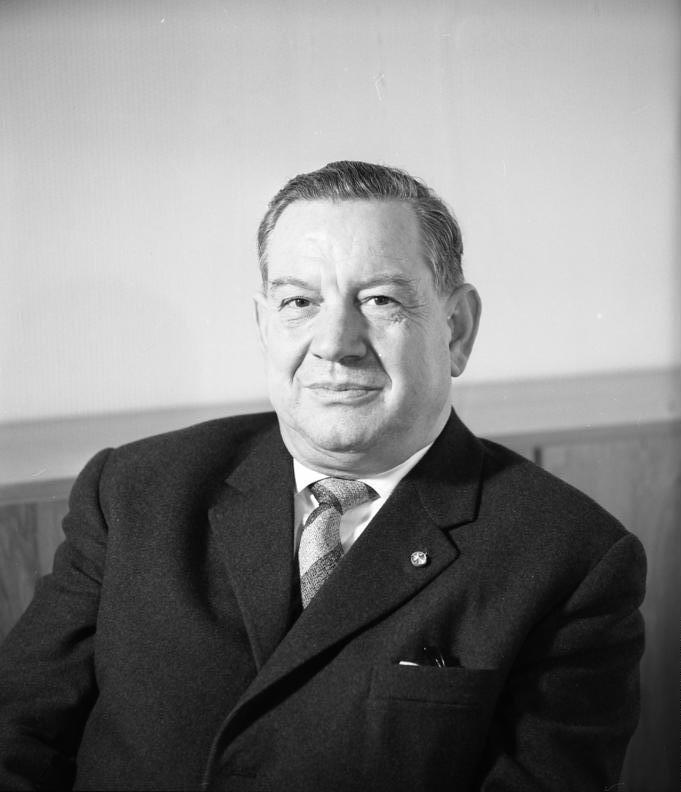

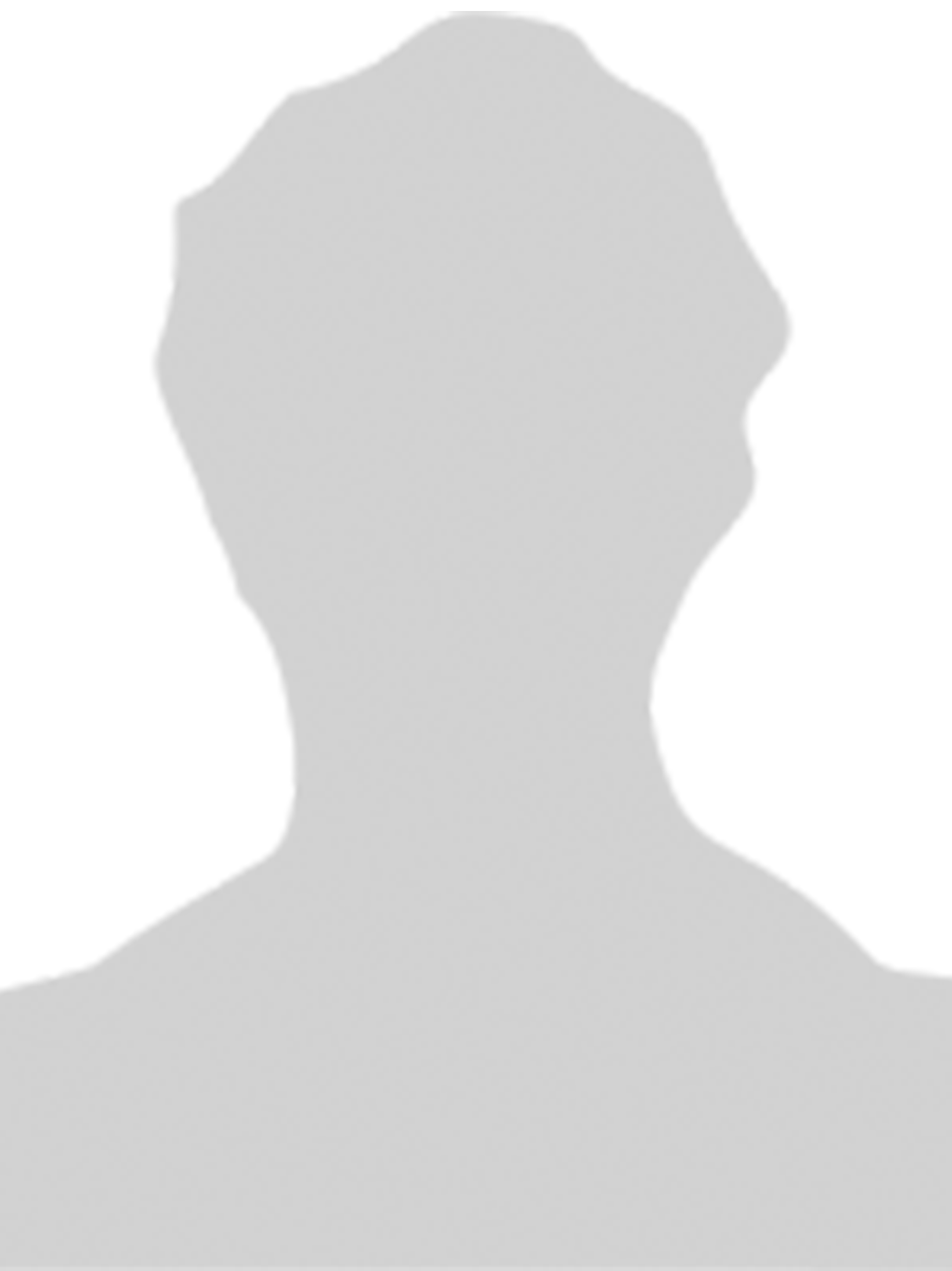

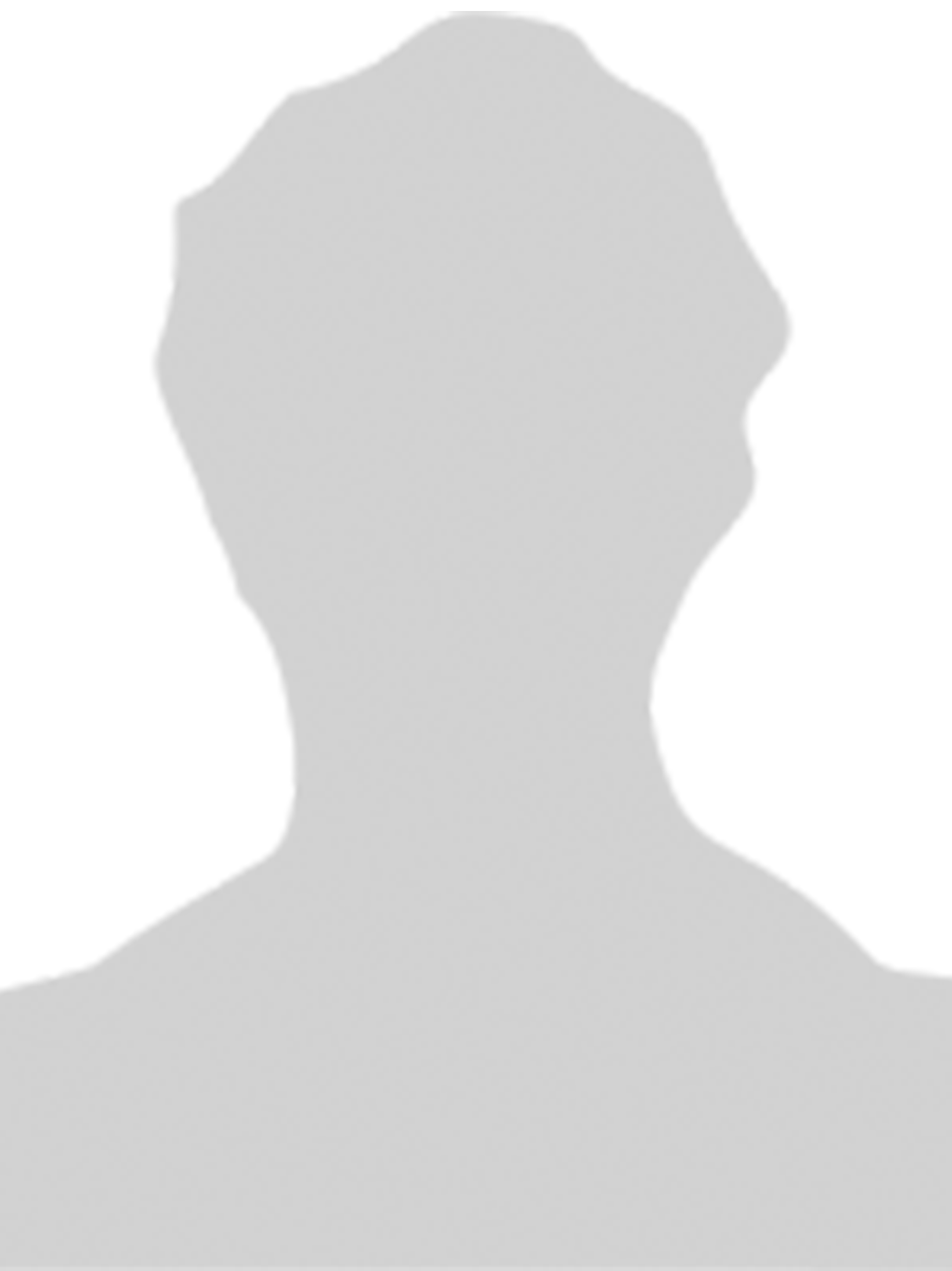

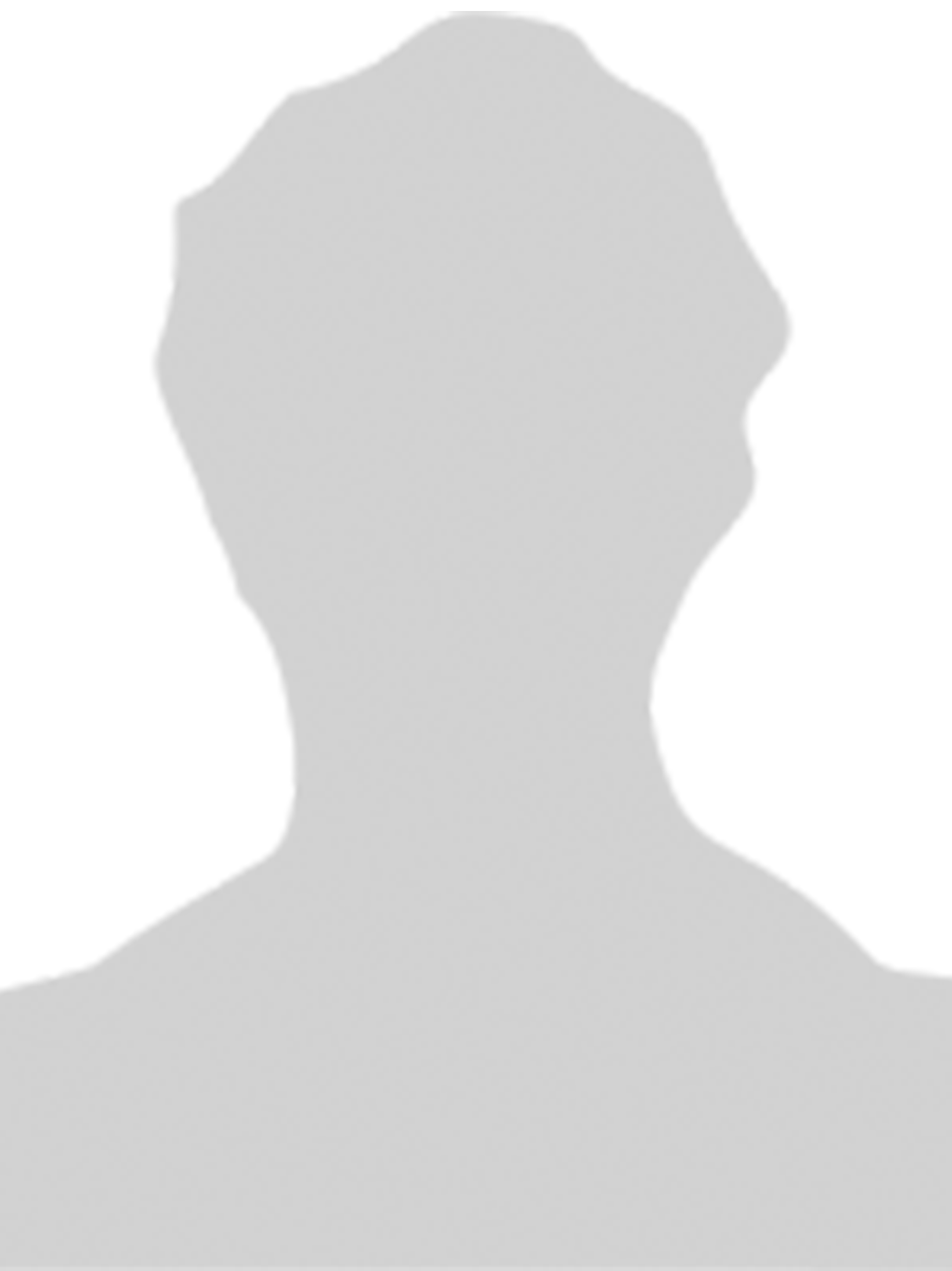

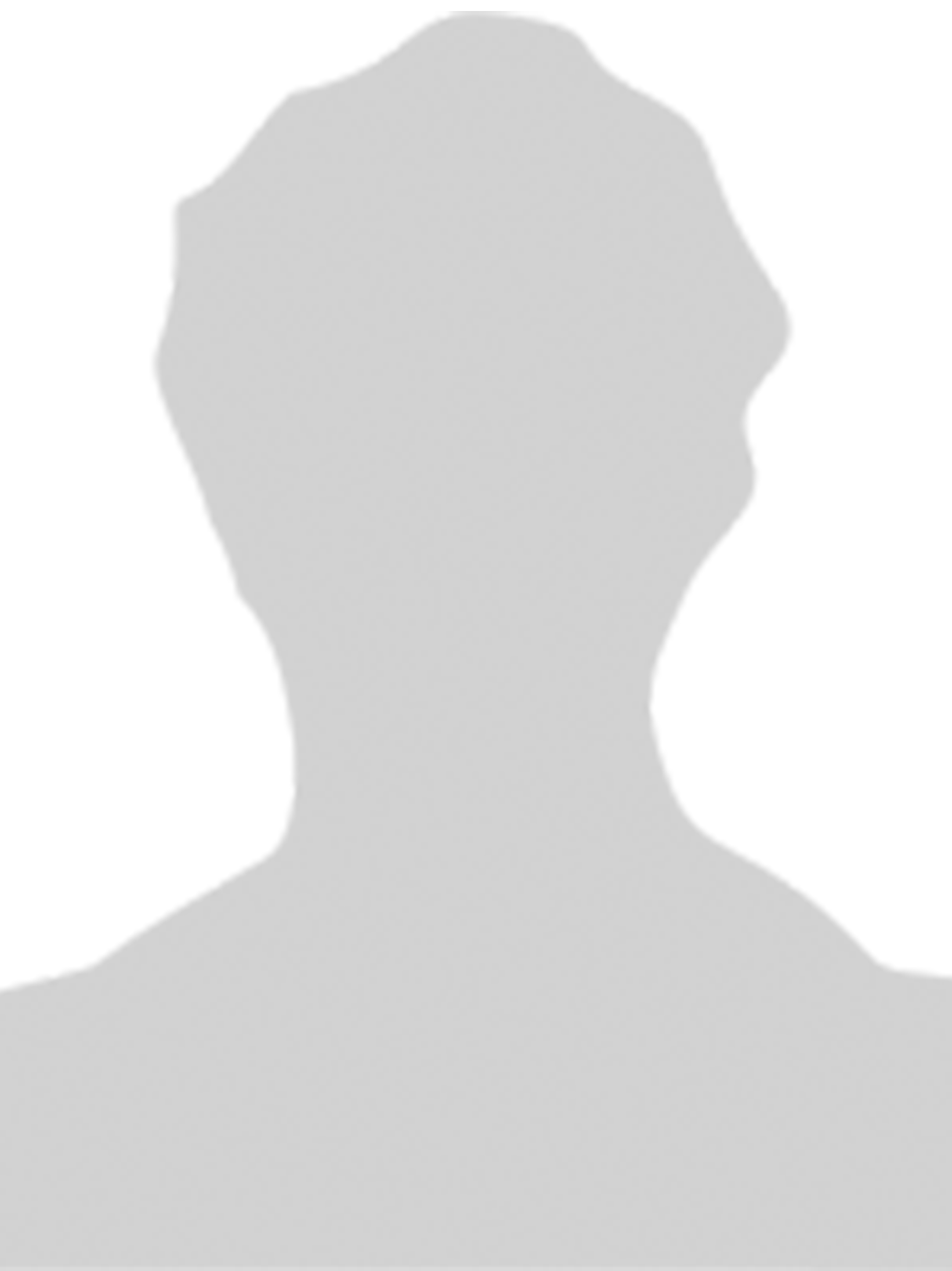
	First party	Second party	Third party
Leader	Alfons Goppel	Volkmar Gabert
Party	CSU	SPD	FDP
Seats won	108	79	9
Seat change	▲7	▲15	▲1
Popular vote	4,663,528	3,465,168	577,836
Percentage	47.5%	35.3%	5.6%
Swing	▲1.9%	▲4.5%	▲0.3%
	Fourth party	Fifth party
Party	GDP	BP
Seats won	0	8
Seat change	▼17 (Note: Results of the GB/BHE in the last election.)	▼6
Popular vote	498,809	469,877
Percentage	5.1%	4.8%
Swing	▼3.9% (Note: Compared to the results of the GB/BHE and the German Party (DP) in the last election.)	▼3.3%
Minister-President before election
Hans Ehard
CSU-FDP-GB/BHE
Elected Minister-President
Alfons Goppel
CSU-BP

The 1962 Bavarian state election took place on 25 November 1962 to elect members of the Landtag of Bavaria. Voter turnout was 76.5%.

== Electoral system ==
A 10% threshold was applied at the district level, meaning that a party had to receive 10% of the valid votes in at least one of the districts to enter the state parliament.

== Result ==
The CSU achieved an absolute majority of seats for the first time since 1946, but under newly elected Minister-President Alfons Goppel, it entered into a coalition with the Bavaria Party for the new legislative period. Goppel's defeated opponent, Volkmar Gabert, assumed the position of opposition leader along with the SPD parliamentary group leader. The GDP failed to overcome the 10% hurdle in one administrative district, but the BP did so in Lower Bavaria.

Party	First votes	Second votes	Total votes	Total in %	Seats
Christian Social Union (CSU)	2,343,169	2,320,359	4,663,528	47.51 %	108
Social Democratic Party of Germany (SPD)	1,770,302	1,694,866	3,465,168	35.30 %	79
Free Democratic Party (FDP)	289,666	288,170	577,836	5.89 %	9
All-German Party (GDP)	254,872	243,937	498,809	5.08 %	–
Bavaria Party (BP)	245,286	224,591	469,877	4.79 %	8
German Peace Union (DFU)	43,042	41,837	84,879	0.86 %	–
German Community (DG)	15,809	14,854	30,663	0.31 %	–
Pfr.	7,670	7,043	14,713	0.15 %	–
NBM	2,274	3,424	5,698	0.06 %	
VU	2,488	2,718	5,206	0.05 %	

Popular Vote
CSU	47.51%
SPD	35.30%
FDP	5.89%
GDP	5.08%
BP	4.79%
Other	1.43%

Landtag seats
CSU	52.94%
SPD	38.73%
FDP	4.41%
BP	3.92%

== See also ==
- List of members of the 5th Landtag of Bavaria
- First Goppel cabinet
- State elections in Bavaria
