= Alfred Dick (politician) =

German politician (1927–2005)

Alfred Dick (December 6, 1927 – March 7, 2005) was a German politician and school teacher, representative of the Christian Social Union of Bavaria. Between 1962 and 1994 he was a member of the Landtag of Bavaria. He served as Bavarian State Minister for the Environment (1977–1990).

== See also ==
- List of Bavarian Christian Social Union politicians
