= Landtag of Bavaria =

State legislature in Germany

Coordinates: 48°08′11″N 11°35′40″E

Landtag of Bavaria Bayerischer Landtag
- 19. Bayerischer Landtag; 19th Bavarian State Parliament

Type
- Type: Landtag
- Established: 4 February 1819 (1311)

Leadership
- President of the Landtag: Ilse Aigner, CSU since 5 November 2018
- First Vice President: Tobias Reiß, CSU since 2023

Structure
- Seats: 203
- Political groups: Government (122) CSU (85) FW (37) Opposition (81) AfD (32) Greens (32) SPD (17)

Elections
- Last election: 8 October 2023
- Next election: 2028

Meeting place
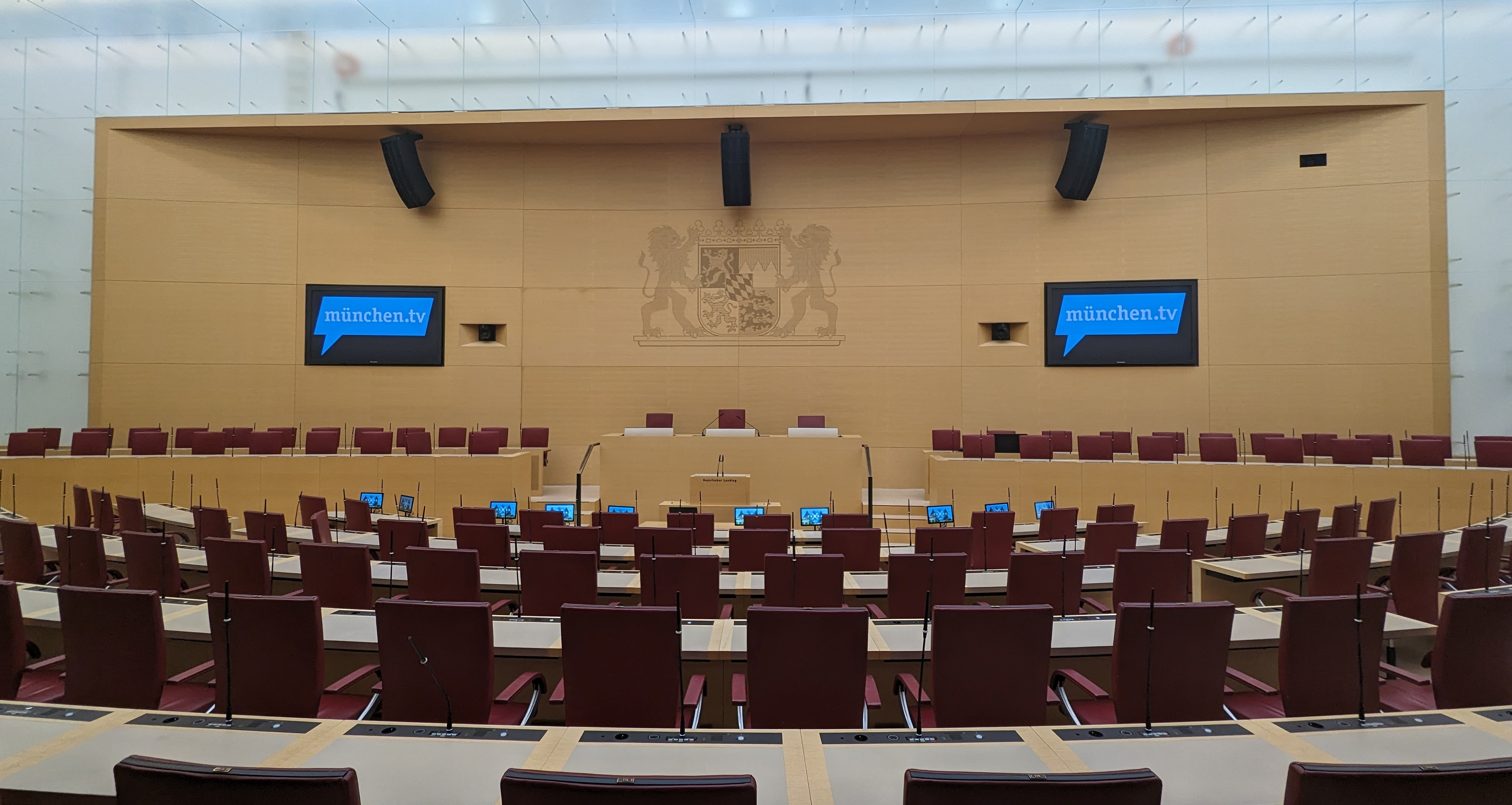
- Maximilianeum, Munich

Website
- www.bayern.landtag.de/

The Landtag of Bavaria, officially known in English as the Bavarian State Parliament, is the unicameral legislature of the German state of Bavaria. The parliament meets in the Maximilianeum in Munich.

Elections to the Landtag are held every five years and have to be conducted on a Sunday or public holiday. The following elections have to be held no earlier than 59 months and no later than 62 months after the previous one, unless the Landtag is dissolved. The most recent elections to the Bavarian Landtag were held on 8 October 2023.

Bavaria's current state government, the third Söder cabinet, was formed after the 2023 election and is a coalition of the Christian Social Union (CSU) and the Free Voters (FW). An identical coalition was in power as the second Söder cabinet between 2018 and 2023. Markus Söder has been Minister-President of Bavaria since March 2018, when he succeeded Horst Seehofer.

== History ==
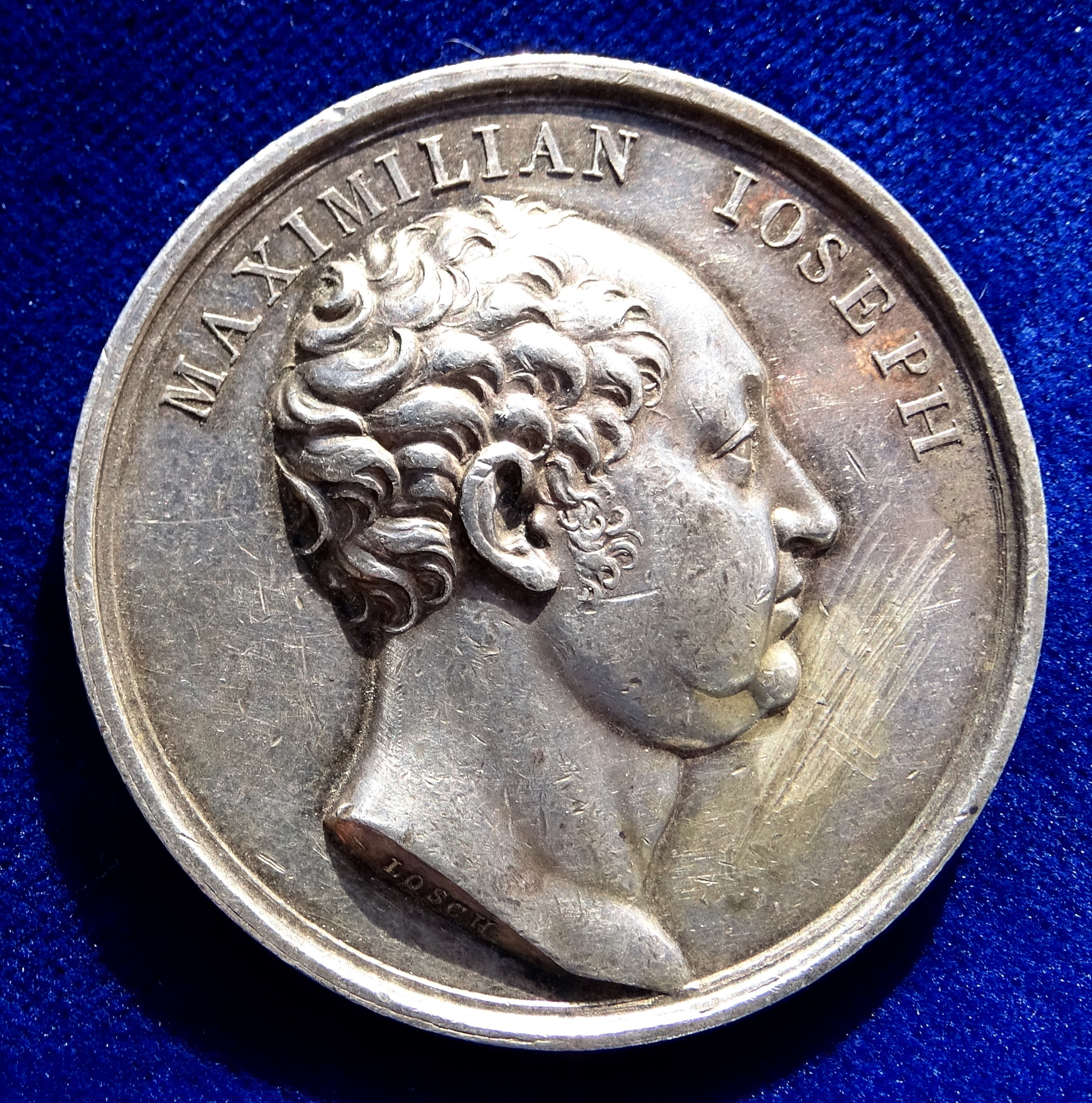
Presentation medal of the Bayerische Ständeversammlung 1819 to King Maximilian I Joseph, on the first anniversary of the constitution of 1818, obverse

The Landtag of Bavaria was founded in 1818, in the Kingdom of Bavaria. The first assembly was held on 4 February 1819. Originally it was called the Ständeversammlung and was divided into an upper house, the Kammer der Reichsräte (House of Councillors), and a lower house, the Kammer der Abgeordneten (House of Representatives). With the act to reform the election of the representatives in 1848 the Ständeversammlung was de facto renamed the Landtag (state diet). The name Landtag was used occasionally before this act.

In the Weimar Republic, from 1919 on, under the Bamberg Constitution, the upper house of the Landtag was abolished and its lower house became a unicameral democratic elected assembly. After the Nazi seizure of power in 1933, the Landtag underwent Gleichschaltung like all German state parliaments. It was dissolved on 30 January 1934 as a result of the "Law on the Reconstruction of the Reich".

After the Second World War, the new Constitution of Bavaria was enacted and the first new Landtag elections took place on 1 December 1946. Between 1946 and 1999 there was again an upper house, the Senate of Bavaria. The CSU has dominated the Bavarian Landtag for nearly the entire post-war period.

The CSU's 2003 election victory was the first time in the history of the Federal Republic of Germany that any party had won a two-thirds majority of seats in an assembly at any level. Five years later in 2008, the CSU saw a stunning reversal of fortunes, and failed to win a majority of seats in Bavaria for the first time in 46 years. In the aftermath of this result, the SPD floated the idea that the four other parties should all unite to form a government excluding the CSU, as it had "lost its mandate to lead": however, the FDP were not interested, and opted to form a coalition with the CSU.

== Composition ==
Constituencies and electoral districts for the 2018 and 2023 Bavarian state elections

Like the Bundestag at the federal level, the Bavarian Landtag is elected through mixed-member proportional representation. There are at least 180 seats, but more are sometimes added as overhang and leveling seats.

As of the 2018 and 2023 elections, the state is divided into 91 electoral districts, which each elect one representative in the same manner as under first-past-the-post. To achieve a proportional result, another 89 seats are elected on open party lists in the 7 administrative regions of the state, which the Constitution of Bavaria define as constituencies. Seats are assigned to each constituency based on population. The 89 seats are allocated to the parties such that, also taking into account the 91 districts seats, each party is represented in proportion to its share of the vote in the constituencies. On election day, people vote separately for a candidate in their electoral districts (called the "first vote") and for a candidate in their constituency (called the "second vote").

As of the 2018 and 2023 elections, seats are assigned to the constituency as follows:

| Constituency | Single-member districts | Seats (Note: Without overhang and leveling seats) |
|---|---|---|
| Lower Bavaria | 9 | 18 |
| Lower Franconia | 10 | 19 |
| Middle Franconia | 12 | 24 |
| Swabia | 13 | 26 |
| Upper Bavaria | 31 | 61 |
| Upper Franconia | 8 | 16 |
| Upper Palatinate | 8 | 16 |
| Total | 91 | 180 |

== Election results since 1946 ==
| Year | CSU | SPD | B'90/Grüne | AfD | Linke | BP | FDP | FW | BHE DG | GB BHE | KPD | NPD | ÖDP | REP | WAV |
|---|---|---|---|---|---|---|---|---|---|---|---|---|---|---|---|
| 1946 Jun | 58.2 | 28.8 | — | — | — | — | 2.5 | — | — | — | 5.3 | — | — | — | 5.1 |
| 1946 Dec | 52.3 | 28.6 | — | — | — | — | 5.7 | — | — | — | 6.1 | — | — | — | 7.4 |
| 1950 | 27.4 | 28.0 | — | — | — | 17.9 | 7.1 | — | 12.3 | — | — | — | — | — | — |
| 1954 | 38.0 | 28.1 | — | — | — | 13.2 | 7.2 | — | — | 10.2 | — | — | — | — | — |
| 1958 | 45.6 | 30.8 | — | — | — | 8.1 | 5.6 | — | — | 8.6 | — | — | — | — | — |
| 1962 | 47.5 | 35.3 | — | — | — | 4.8 | 5.9 | — | — | 5.1 | — | — | — | — | — |
| 1966 | 48.1 | 35.8 | — | — | — | 3.2 | 5.1 | — | — | — | — | 7.4 | — | — | — |
| 1970 | 56.4 | 33.3 | — | — | — | 1.3 | 5.6 | — | — | — | — | — | — | — | — |
| 1974 | 62.1 | 30.2 | — | — | — | 0.8 | 5.2 | — | — | — | — | — | — | — | — |
| 1978 | 59.1 | 31.4 | — | — | — | 0.4 | 6.2 | — | — | — | — | — | — | — | — |
| 1982 | 58.3 | 31.9 | 4.6 | — | — | 0.5 | 3.5 | — | — | — | — | — | 0.4 | — | — |
| 1986 | 55.8 | 27.5 | 7.5 | — | — | 0.6 | 3.8 | — | — | — | — | — | 0.7 | 3.0 | — |
| 1990 | 54.9 | 26.0 | 6.4 | — | — | 0.8 | 5.2 | — | — | — | — | — | 1.7 | 4.9 | — |
| 1994 | 52.8 | 30.0 | 6.1 | — | — | 1.0 | 2.8 | — | — | — | — | — | 2.1 | 3.9 | — |
| 1998 | 52.9 | 28.7 | 5.7 | — | — | 0.7 | 1.7 | 3.7 | — | — | — | — | 1.8 | 3.6 | — |
| 2003 | 60.7 | 19.6 | 7.7 | — | — | 0.8 | 2.6 | 4.0 | — | — | — | — | 2.0 | 2.2 | — |
| 2008 | 43.4 | 18.6 | 9.4 | — | 4.3 | 1.1 | 8.0 | 10.2 | — | — | — | 1.2 | 2.0 | 1.4 | — |
| 2013 | 47.7 | 20.6 | 8.6 | — | 2.1 | 2.1 | 3.3 | 9.0 | — | — | — | 0.6 | 2.0 | 1.0 | — |
| 2018 | 37.2 | 9.7 | 17.6 | 10.2 | 3.2 | 1.7 | 5.1 | 11.6 | — | — | — | — | 1.6 | — | — |
| 2023 | 37.0 | 8.4 | 14.4 | 14.6 | 1.5 | 0.9 | 3.0 | 15.8 | — | — | — | — | 1.8 | — | — |

Bold=Largest Party in Landtag

Source:"Election Results 1946-2018" (PDF). Archived from the original (PDF) on 15 March 2023.

Parties:

- AfD: Alternative for Germany – Alternative für Deutschland
- B'90/Grüne: Alliance 90/The Greens – Bündnis 90/Die Grünen
- BP: Bavaria Party – Bayernpartei
- CSU: Christian Social Union of Bavaria – Christlich Soziale Union Bayerns
- FDP: Free Democratic Party – Freie Demokratische Partei
- FW: Independents – Freie Wähler
- GB/BHE: All-German Bloc/League of Expellees and Deprived of Rights – Gesamtdeutscher Block/Block der Heimatvertriebenen und Entrechteten
- KPD: Communist Party of Germany – Kommunistische Partei Deutschlands
- Linke: The Left – Die Linke
- NPD: National Democratic Party of Germany – Nationaldemokratische Partei Deutschlands
- ÖDP: Ecological Democratic Party – Ökologisch-Demokratische Partei
- REP: The Republicans – Die Republikaner
- SPD: Social Democratic Party of Germany – Sozialdemokratische Partei Deutschland
- WAV: Wirtschaftliche Aufbau Vereinigung

== See also ==
- 2023 Bavarian state election
- 2028 Bavarian state election
- Bavarian Landtag elections in the Weimar Republic
