= Alfons Goppel =

German politician

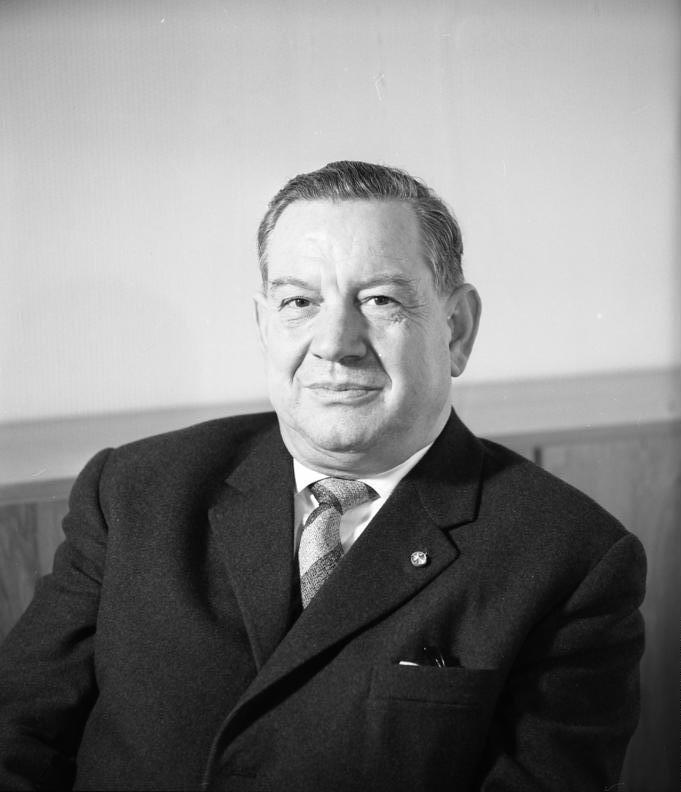
- Goppel in 1963

Minister-President of Bavaria
- In office 11 December 1962 – 6 November 1978
- President: Heinrich Lübke; Gustav Heinemann; Walter Scheel
- Chancellor: Konrad Adenauer; Ludwig Erhard; Kurt Georg Kiesinger; Willy Brandt; Helmut Schmidt
- Preceded by: Hans Ehard
- Succeeded by: Franz Josef Strauss

Minister of the Interior of Bavaria
- In office 9 December 1958 – 11 December 1962
- Preceded by: Otto Bezold
- Succeeded by: Heinrich Junker

President of the Bundesrat
- In office 1 November 1972 – 31 October 1973
- Preceded by: Heinz Kühn
- Succeeded by: Hans Filbinger

Personal details
- Born: 1 October 1905 Reinhausen, Kingdom of Bavaria, German Empire
- Died: 24 December 1991 (aged 86) Johannesberg, Lower Franconia, Bavaria, Germany
- Party: NSDAP; CSU
- Spouse: Gertrud Wittenbrink
- Children: 6
- Occupation: Lawyer

Alfons Goppel (1 October 1905 – 24 December 1991) was a German politician of the CSU party and Minister-President of Bavaria (1962–1978).

== Biography ==
Alfons Goppel was born in Reinhausen (now Regensburg), one of the nine children of the baker Ludwig Goppel and his wife Barbara.

He married Gertrud Wittenbrink in 1935 and they had six sons.

Goppel studied law in Munich from 1925 to 1929 and, after graduating, moved back to Regensburg, where he became a lawyer. He joined the state prosecutors office in 1934 and was posted to Mainburg, Kaiserslautern and finally Aschaffenburg. He joined the conservative Bavarian People's Party in 1930 and was a member until the party's self-dissolution in November 1933. He joined the SA (1933) and the NSDAP (1937) in the following years.

He took part in the campaigns in France and Russia in the German Wehrmacht during the Second World War and later became an instructor at the Infanterieschule Döberitz, near Berlin, a training camp of the German army.

Returning from the war, he became an official at the city of Aschaffenburg, responsible for housing and refugees. He was elected to the Bavarian Landtag in October 1947 but barred from taking up his seat due to his political past. He, unsuccessfully, campaigned for the Landtag in 1950 again, became second mayor of Aschaffenburg in 1952 and finally, in 1954, was elected to the Landtag and permitted to take up his seat. He remained in the Bavarian parliament until 1978, when he gave it up to become a member of the European Parliament.

He unsuccessfully ran for mayor of Würzburg in 1956 and became an under secretary in the Bavarian Ministry of Justice the year after. He was Bavarian Minister of the Interior (1958–1962) and Minister-President of Bavaria from 11 December 1962 to 7 November 1978, serving as President of the Bundesrat in 1972/73. In 1974 he gained the highest election victory for the CSU in Bavarian history with 62.1% of the votes.

From 1979 to 1984 he was a member of the European Parliament, as such being part of the first freely elected group of MPs in 1979. He died, aged 86, in Johannesberg, near Aschaffenburg.

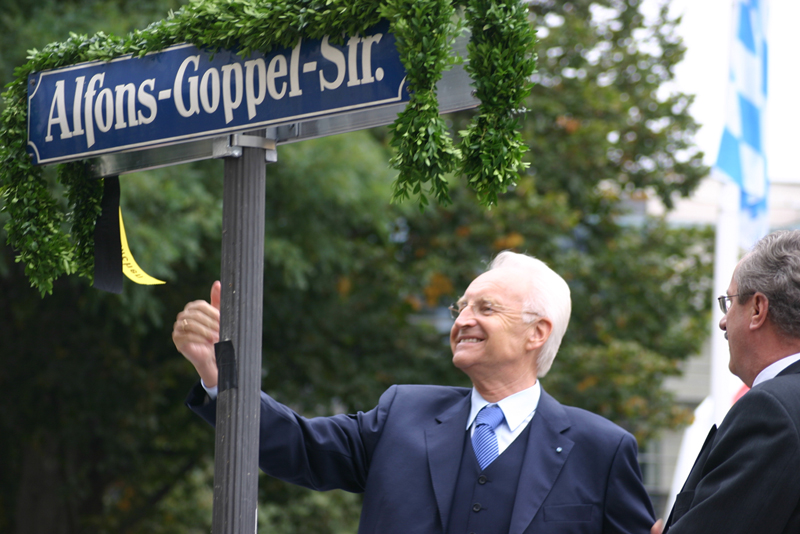
A street in Munich was named after him in 2005.

One of his sons, Thomas Goppel, later served amongst others as Minister of Science, Research and the Arts (2003–2008).

The Alfons-Goppel-Stiftung (Alfons Goppel Foundation), formed in 1980 and named after him, supports needy children in third-world countries.

== Honors ==
- Honorary doctorate of the University of Würzburg and the St. John's University Minnesota

Political offices
Preceded by Hans Ehard	Prime Minister of Bavaria; 1962 – 1978	Succeeded by Franz Josef Strauss
