= Opinion polling for the 2025 German federal election =

In the run-up to the 2025 German federal election, which took place as a snap election on 23 February 2025, various organisations carried out opinion polling to gauge voting intentions in Germany. Results of such polls are displayed below.

== Electoral threshold of 5% ==
In the runup to the 2025 snap election, four of the eight main parties represented in the Bundestag were at risk of failing to pass the 5% electoral threshold, thus placing the actual outcome in significant uncertainty. The Social Democratic Party (SPD) led by Chancellor Olaf Scholz, the Christian Democratic Union (CDU) led by challenger Friedrich Merz, the Alternative for Germany (AfD) led by challenger Alice Weidel, and the Alliance 90/The Greens led by candidate Robert Habeck were all expected to obtain a voting volume that is significantly higher than the qualifying 5% threshold.

Seats in the Bundestag are allocated to party lists that either pass the "five percent hurdle" of federally valid second votes, or win at least three constituencies. In the 2021 German federal election, this granted Die Linke (The Left) full proportional representation as it won three constituencies despite receiving 4.9% of second-ballot votes. In 2022, this three-constituency rule was abolished, but was reinstated by the Federal Constitutional Court. In addition to Die Linke, this also benefits the Christian Social Union (CSU) which competes only in Bavaria and, in the 2021 German federal elections, only passed the threshold with 5.2% of second-ballot votes nationwide but won 45 out of 46 constituencies in Bavaria. As the CDU/CSU "Union" don't compete against each other and form one faction in the parliament, both "sister parties" are combined in most polls, but some show separate numbers.

Polling around 5% were the Free Democratic Party (FDP) that was part of the "Traffic Light Coalition" whose collapse led to the snap election, Die Linke, and the new Sahra Wagenknecht Alliance (BSW) which split off from The Left in 2023.

Also shown in the polls are the Free Voters (FW) which are present in three state parliaments (Bavaria, Rhineland-Palatinate and Saxony) and one state government coalition (Bavaria). Only three other parties have managed to get approved in all states, and several others run in selected states. They are all summed up as "others".

== Reliability of pollsters ==
The poll aggregator Europe Elects provides a list of past pollster accuracy and conflict of interest on its website. The organization includes Allensbach, Forsa, Forschungsgruppe Wahlen, GMS, Infratest dimap, INSA, Ipsos, Verian, YouGov, pollytix, Trend research, and pmg - policy matters in its databases and highlights their reliability and transparency. All of them are part of professional pollster associations. Civey is excluded and their lack of methodological rigour referenced. Below-listed Wahlkreisprognose and American-based Democracy Institute are excluded from Europe Elects's coverage. The poll aggregator points out that they have no membership in a professional association.

== Poll results ==
=== Graphical summary ===
Opinion polling for the 2025 German federal election using Local regression (LOESS) of polls conducted. Data up to 19 February 2025

=== 2025 ===
Polling firm	Fieldwork date	Sample size	Abs.	SPD	Union	Grüne	FDP	AfD	Linke	FW	BSW	Others	Lead
2025 federal election	23 Feb 2025	–	17.5	16.4	28.5	11.6	4.3	20.8	8.8	1.5	5.0 (Note: Rounded from 4.98%, which is below the threshold for parliamentary representation in Germany.)	3.1	7.7
INSA	21–22 Feb 2025	2,005	–	15	29.5	12.5	4.5	21	7.5	–	5	5	8.5
Wahlkreisprognose	20–21 Feb 2025	1,536	–	14.5	29.5	12	4.5	20.5	8	2	4.5	4.5	9
Ipsos	19–21 Feb 2025	1,000	–	16	30	12	4.5	21	7	–	4.5	5	9
Forschungsgruppe Wahlen	19–20 Feb 2025	1,349	–	16	28	14	4	21	8	–	4.5	4	7
Forsa	17–20 Feb 2025	2,002	–	15	29	13	5	21	8	–	3	6	8
YouGov	17–20 Feb 2025	1,681	–	16	29	13	4	20	8	–	5	5	9
Allensbach	9–20 Feb 2025	1,064	–	14.5	32	12	4.5	20	7.5	–	4.5	6	12
INSA	18–19 Feb 2025	2,086	–	15	30	13	4	21	7	–	5	5	9
GMS	16–19 Feb 2025	1,016	–	15	31	13	4	20	6	2	4	5	11
Ipsos	12–19 Feb 2025	2,000	–	15	31	13	4.5	20	7	–	4.5	5	11
YouGov (MRP)	7–19 Feb 2025	9,281	–	15.6	29.9	12.7	4.5	19.7	7.5	–	4.6	5.6	10.2
Wahlkreisprognose	17–18 Feb 2025	1,000	–	14.5	30	12	4	20	7	2	5	5.5	10
Cluster 17	16–18 Feb 2025	1,457	–	15	30	13	4	21	7	–	4	5	9
Forsa	11–17 Feb 2025	2,501	–	16	30	13	5	20	7	–	4	5	10
YouGov	14–17 Feb 2025	2,131	–	17	27	12	4	20	9	–	5	5	7
INSA	14–17 Feb 2025	2,010	–	15	30	13	4.5	22	6.5	–	5	4	8
INSA	10–14 Feb 2025	1,205	–	15	30	13	4	21	6	–	5	6	9
Forschungsgruppe Wahlen	11–13 Feb 2025	1,348	14	16	30	14	4	20	7	–	4	5	10
Wahlkreisprognose	11–13 Feb 2025	1,700	–	12.5	32	12.5	4	20	6	1.5	4.5	7	12
Infratest dimap	10–12 Feb 2025	1,579	–	14	32	14	4	21	6	–	4.5	4.5	11
Allensbach	31 Jan – 12 Feb 2025	1,021	–	15	32	13	5	20	6	–	4	6	12
Pollytix	11–12 Feb 2025	1,501	–	17	29	14	4	19	6	–	5	6	10
YouGov	7–10 Feb 2025	2,083	–	16	29	12	4	21	6	–	5	6	8
INSA	7–10 Feb 2025	2,006	–	15.5	30	13	4	22	6	–	5.5	4	8
Forsa	4–10 Feb 2025	2,502	23	16	29	14	4	20	6	–	4	7	9
GMS	4–7 Feb 2025	1,011	–	15	30	14	4	21	5	2	4	5	9
INSA	3–7 Feb 2025	1,204	–	16	29	12	4	21	5	–	6	7	8
Pollytix	5–6 Feb 2025	1,529	–	17	30	12	4	20	6	–	5	6	10
Forschungsgruppe Wahlen	4–6 Feb 2025	1,341	20	15	30	15	4	20	6	–	4	6	10
Infratest dimap	3–5 Feb 2025	1,302	–	15	31	14	4	21	5	–	4	6	10
YouGov (MRP)	17 Jan – 5 Feb 2025	9,322	–	15.3	29.0	13.3	4.1	19.9	5.2	–	5.4	7.9	9.1
YouGov	31 Jan – 4 Feb 2025	2,181	–	18	29	12	4	22	6	–	6	4	7
Wahlkreisprognose	1–3 Feb 2025	1,900	–	16.5	28	12	4.5	19.5	5	2.5	5.5	6.5	8.5
INSA	31 Jan – 3 Feb 2025	2,004	–	16	30	13	4.5	22	5	–	5.5	4	8
INSA	30–31 Jan 2025	1,203	–	17	30	12	4	22	4	–	6	5	8
Ipsos	30–31 Jan 2025	1,000	–	16	29	13	4	21	4	–	5	8	8
INSA	30 Jan 2025	1,001	–	17	29	13	4	22	4	–	6	5	7
Forsa	28 Jan – 3 Feb 2025	2,503	–	16	28	15	4	20	5	–	4	8	8
Democracy Institute	28–30 Jan 2025	2,430	–	15	27	13	5	25	5	–	6	4	2
Infratest dimap	27–29 Jan 2025	1,336	–	15	30	15	4	20	5	–	4	7	10
Forschungsgruppe Wahlen	27–29 Jan 2025	1,428	17	15	29	14	4	21	5	–	4	8	8
Verian	22–28 Jan 2025	1,461	–	15	30	14	4	20	4	–	5	8	10
YouGov	24–27 Jan 2025	1,781	–	15	29	13	3	23	5	–	6	5	6
INSA	24–27 Jan 2025	2,006	–	15.5	30	12.5	4.5	22	4.5	–	6	5	8
Forsa	21–27 Jan 2025	2,504	–	16	30	14	4	20	4	–	3	9	10
INSA	20–24 Jan 2025	1,203	–	16	30	12	4	21	4	–	7	6	9
Forschungsgruppe Wahlen	21–23 Jan 2025	1,345	18	15	30	14	4	21	5	–	3	8	9
Wahlkreisprognose	21–23 Jan 2025	1,500	–	17	28.5	14	3.5	21.5	3.5	1.5	4.5	6	7
YouGov	17–20 Jan 2025	1,858	–	19	28	15	4	19	4	–	6	6	9
INSA	17–20 Jan 2025	2,008	–	16	29	13	5	21.5	4	–	7	4.5	7.5
Forsa	14–20 Jan 2025	2,502	–	16	31	13	4	19	3	–	4	10	12
Allensbach	7–19 Jan 2025	1,015	–	17	34	13.5	4	20	–	–	5	6.5	14
Ipsos	16–18 Jan 2025	1,000	–	16	30	14	4	19	3	2	6	6	11
INSA	13–17 Jan 2025	1,206	–	16	29	13	5	21	4	–	7	5	8
Wahlkreisprognose	13–16 Jan 2025	2,000	–	16.5	29	15	4	21	2.5	2	4	6	8
YouGov (MRP)	3 Dec – 15 Jan 2025	10,411	–	15.6	29.8	13.6	4.5	19.7	2.9	–	6.0	7.8	10.1
YouGov	10–14 Jan 2025	1,771	–	18	30	14	4	21	4	–	6	5	9
INSA	10–13 Jan 2025	2,005	–	15	31	13	4	22	3.5	–	6.5	5	9
Forsa	7–13 Jan 2025	2,504	28	16	31	13	4	20	3	–	4	9	11
INSA	6–10 Jan 2025	1,205	–	16	30	13	4	22	3	–	6	6	8
Forschungsgruppe Wahlen	7–9 Jan 2025	1,433	18	14	30	15	4	21	4	–	4	8	9
Infratest dimap	6–8 Jan 2025	1,323	–	15	31	14	4	20	4	–	5	7	11
YouGov	3–6 Jan 2025	1,908	–	16	29	14	5	21	3	–	6	6	8
INSA	3–6 Jan 2025	2,001	–	15.5	31	13.5	4	21.5	3	–	6.5	5	9.5
Forsa	2–6 Jan 2025	1,501	27	17	32	12	3	19	3	–	4	10	13
Ipsos	2–4 Jan 2025	1,000	–	16	30	13	4	19	3	2	7	6	11
INSA	30 Dec – 3 Jan 2025	1,201	–	16	31	13	4	20	3	–	7	6	11
GMS	27 Dec – 2 Jan 2025	1,010	–	16	33	13	4	18	3	2	4	7	15
2021 federal election	26 Sep 2021	–	23.4	25.7	24.2	14.7	11.4	10.4	4.9	2.4	–	6.3	1.5

=== 2024 ===
Polling firm	Fieldwork date	Sample size	Abs.	SPD	Union	Grüne	FDP	AfD	Linke	FW	BSW	Others	Lead
INSA	27–30 Dec 2024	2,004	–	16.5	31	12	3.5	20.5	4	–	7	5.5	10.5
Wahlkreisprognose	21–28 Dec 2024	2,000	–	18	28	15.5	4	18	2.5	2	6	6	10
INSA	23–27 Dec 2024	1,002	–	17	31	12	4	20	3	–	7	6	11
INSA	20–23 Dec 2024	2,010	–	16	31	12.5	5	19.5	3	–	8	5	11.5
Forsa	17–20 Dec 2024	2,008	25	16	31	13	3	19	4	–	4	10	12
Forschungsgruppe Wahlen	17–19 Dec 2024	1,362	16	15	31	14	3	19	4	–	5	9	12
INSA	16–19 Dec 2024	1,205	–	16	32	12	5	20	3	–	8	4	12
Infratest dimap	16–18 Dec 2024	1,336	–	14	33	14	3	19	3	–	5	9	14
Verian	11–17 Dec 2024	1,452	–	17	31	14	4	18	3	–	5	8	13
Wahlkreisprognose	14–16 Dec 2024	1,500	–	20	29	15	4.5	17	2.5	3	5	4	9
INSA	13–16 Dec 2024	2,002	–	16.5	31.5	11.5	5	19.5	2.5	–	8	5.5	12
Forsa	10–16 Dec 2024	2,501	23	17	30	13	4	19	3	–	4	10	11
INSA	9–13 Dec 2024	1,203	–	17	31	11	5	20	3	–	8	5	11
Allensbach	30 Nov – 12 Dec 2024	1,006	–	16	36	12	4	18	–	–	6	8	18
INSA	6–9 Dec 2024	2,004	–	17	31.5	11.5	4.5	19.5	3	–	8	5	12
Forsa	3–9 Dec 2024	2,501	22	17	31	13	4	18	3	–	4	10	13
INSA	2–6 Dec 2024	1,202	–	16	32	12	4	19	4	–	8	5	13
Forschungsgruppe Wahlen	3–5 Dec 2024	1,433	17	15	33	14	4	17	3	–	5	9	16
Wahlkreisprognose	2–5 Dec 2024	2,000	–	18.5	31	11.5	3	20.5	3	3	3.5	6	10.5
Infratest dimap	2–4 Dec 2024	1,307	–	16	32	14	4	18	3	–	5	8	14
YouGov	29 Nov – 3 Dec 2024	1,879	–	18	30	13	4	19	3	1	7	6	11
INSA	29 Nov – 2 Dec 2024	2,003	–	16	31.5	13	4.5	18.5	3.5	–	7.5	5.5	13
GMS	27 Nov – 2 Dec 2024	1,005	–	15	34	13	4	17	3	2	6	6	17
Forsa	26 Nov – 2 Dec 2024	2,502	–	16	32	12	3	18	4	–	4	11	14
Ipsos	29 Nov – 1 Dec 2024	1,000	–	16	32	13	3	18	3	3	7	5	14
INSA	25–29 Nov 2024	1,201	–	15	32	13	5	18	3	–	8	6	14
Verian	20–26 Nov 2024	1,432	–	15	32	13	4	18	3	–	6	9	14
INSA	22–25 Nov 2024	2,003	–	15	32.5	11	4.5	19.5	3.5	–	7.5	6.5	13
Forsa	19–25 Nov 2024	2,500	–	15	32	12	4	18	4	–	4	11	14
Forschungsgruppe Wahlen	19–21 Nov 2024	1,399	15	16	32	12	3	18	4	–	5	10	14
INSA	18–21 Nov 2024	1,203	–	14	32	11	5	19	4	–	7	8	13
Infratest dimap	18–20 Nov 2024	1,318	–	14	33	14	4	19	3	–	6	7	14
Wahlkreisprognose	14–20 Nov 2024	2,000	–	15	34	11	4	18.5	2.5	2.5	5	7.5	15.5
INSA	15–18 Nov 2024	2,008	–	16	32	11	4.5	19	3.5	–	7.5	6.5	13
Forsa	12–18 Nov 2024	2,500	–	15	33	11	4	18	4	–	4	11	15
INSA	11–15 Nov 2024	1,204	–	16	32	10	4	19	4	–	8	7	13
Allensbach	2–14 Nov 2024	1,049	–	15	37	10	4	17	–	–	7.5	9.5	20
YouGov	8–12 Nov 2024	1,805	–	15	33	12	5	19	3	1	7	6	14
INSA	8–11 Nov 2024	3,009	–	15.5	32.5	11.5	5	19.5	3.5	–	7	5.5	13
Forsa	5–11 Nov 2024	2,501	–	16	33	11	4	17	3	–	5	11	16
INSA	7–8 Nov 2024	1,065	–	15	32	10	4	19	4	–	7	9	13
Infratest dimap	7 Nov 2024	1,065	–	16	34	12	5	18	–	–	6	9	16
Forsa	7 Nov 2024	1,181	–	17	32	11	3	17	3	–	6	11	15
Forschungsgruppe Wahlen	5–7 Nov 2024	1,231	15	16	33	12	3	18	4	–	6	8	15
INSA	1–4 Nov 2024	2,005	–	15.5	32	10.5	4.5	18	3.5	–	8	8	14
Forsa	29 Oct – 4 Nov 2024	2,500	–	16	33	10	3	16	3	–	6	13	17
Ipsos	1–2 Nov 2024	1,000	–	15	32	11	5	18	3	3	8	5	14
INSA	28 Oct – 1 Nov 2024	1,202	–	16	32	10	4	18	4	–	8	8	14
Infratest dimap	28–30 Oct 2024	1,333	–	16	34	11	4	17	–	–	6	12	17
Verian	23–29 Oct 2024	1,443	–	16	32	11	3	17	3	–	8	10	15
INSA	25–28 Oct 2024	2,008	–	15	31	11	4	19	2.5	–	9	8.5	12
Forsa	22–28 Oct 2024	2,503	23	16	32	9	4	17	3	–	7	12	15
INSA	21–25 Oct 2024	1,204	–	15	30	11	4	19	3	–	9	9	11
INSA	18–21 Oct 2024	2,006	–	16.5	30.5	10	4	19	2.5	–	9	8.5	11.5
Forsa	15–21 Oct 2024	2,500	–	16	31	11	3	17	3	–	7	12	14
INSA	14–18 Oct 2024	1,201	–	16	31	10	4	19	3	–	9	8	12
Forschungsgruppe Wahlen	15–17 Oct 2024	1,249	12	16	31	11	3	18	4	–	8	9	13
INSA	11–14 Oct 2024	2,002	–	16	31.5	10	4	18.5	3.5	–	9	7.5	13
Forsa	8–14 Oct 2024	2,501	–	16	31	10	4	17	3	–	7	12	14
INSA	7–11 Oct 2024	1,202	–	16	31	11	4	19	3	–	9	7	12
Allensbach	28 Sep – 11 Oct 2024	1,041	–	16	36	10.5	4.5	16	–	–	9	9	20
Infratest dimap	7–9 Oct 2024	1,321	–	16	31	13	3	17	3	3	8	6	14
YouGov	4–8 Oct 2024	1,773	–	16	32	11	5	18	3	1	8	6	14
INSA	4–7 Oct 2024	2,010	–	16	31.5	10.5	4	20	2.5	–	8	7.5	11.5
Forsa	1–7 Oct 2024	2,001	–	17	31	11	3	17	3	–	6	12	14
Ipsos	2–4 Oct 2024	1,000	–	15	31	11	4	18	3	3	8	7	13
INSA	30 Sep – 4 Oct 2024	1,237	–	16	31	11	4	20	3	–	8	7	11
Verian	25 Sep – 1 Oct 2024	1,452	–	16	31	11	4	17	3	3	7	8	14
INSA	27–30 Sep 2024	2,002	–	15	31.5	11	4	19	2.5	–	9.5	7.5	12.5
Forsa	24–30 Sep 2024	2,501	–	17	31	10	4	17	3	–	6	12	14
INSA	23–27 Sep 2024	1,203	–	15	32	11	4	19	3	–	10	6	13
Forschungsgruppe Wahlen	24–26 Sep 2024	1,348	16	16	31	12	4	17	4	–	8	8	14
INSA	20–23 Sep 2024	2,002	–	15.5	32	9.5	3.5	20	2.5	–	10	7	12
Forsa	17–23 Sep 2024	2,500	21	15	32	11	4	17	–	–	7	14	15
INSA	16–19 Sep 2024	1,202	–	15	32	10	4	20	2	–	10	7	12
INSA	13–16 Sep 2024	2,008	–	14	33	10	4.5	19.5	2.5	–	10	6.5	13.5
GMS	11–16 Sep 2024	1,006	–	14	34	11	4	18	2	3	7	7	16
Forsa	10–16 Sep 2024	2,501	–	15	31	11	4	17	3	–	6	13	14
INSA	9–13 Sep 2024	1,206	–	14	33	10	4	19	3	–	10	7	14
Allensbach	29 Aug – 11 Sep 2024	1,017	–	16	35.5	10	4	17	–	–	9	8.5	18.5
YouGov	6–10 Sep 2024	1,752	–	14	32	13	4	18	4	1	8	6	14
INSA	6–9 Sep 2024	2,010	–	14	32.5	10	4	19.5	2.5	–	10	7.5	13
Forsa	3–9 Sep 2024	2,500	–	14	33	11	3	17	3	–	7	12	16
Ipsos	6–7 Sep 2024	1,000	–	13	32	11	4	18	3	2	9	8	14
INSA	2–6 Sep 2024	1,202	–	15	31	10	4	19	3	–	10	8	12
Forschungsgruppe Wahlen	3–5 Sep 2024	1,328	14	15	33	11	4	17	4	–	7	9	16
Infratest dimap	3–4 Sep 2024	1,309	–	15	33	11	4	17	3	–	8	9	16
Verian	28 Aug – 3 Sep 2024	1,427	–	15	31	12	4	17	3	–	8	10	14
INSA	30 Aug – 2 Sep 2024	2,002	–	15	31.5	10.5	4.5	19	2.5	–	9.5	7.5	12.5
Forsa	27 Aug – 2 Sep 2024	2,508	–	14	32	11	5	17	3	–	7	11	15
INSA	26–30 Aug 2024	1,202	–	16	31	11	4	19	3	–	9	7	12
INSA	23–26 Aug 2024	2,004	–	15	31.5	11.5	5.5	18.5	3	–	9	6	13
Forsa	20–26 Aug 2024	2,501	–	15	31	11	5	17	3	–	7	11	14
INSA	19–23 Aug 2024	1,202	–	16	31	11	5	18	3	–	9	7	13
INSA	16–19 Aug 2024	2,006	–	15.5	30.5	10.5	5	19	3	–	9.5	7	11.5
Forsa	13–19 Aug 2024	2,503	–	15	31	11	5	17	3	–	7	11	14
INSA	12–16 Aug 2024	1,203	–	16	30	11	5	19	3	–	9	7	11
Allensbach	3–15 Aug 2024	1,051	–	16	34	11.5	5	16	3	–	7	7.5	18
Forschungsgruppe Wahlen	12–14 Aug 2024	1,334	14	14	32	13	4	16	3	–	8	10	16
YouGov	9–13 Aug 2024	1,998	–	15	31	12	5	19	3	1	8	6	12
INSA	9–12 Aug 2024	2,008	–	15	30.5	10.5	5	18	3	–	9.5	8.5	12.5
Forsa	6–12 Aug 2024	2,502	22	15	30	11	5	17	3	–	7	12	13
GMS	6–12 Aug 2024	1,006	–	14	32	12	5	17	3	2	8	7	15
INSA	5–9 Aug 2024	1,203	–	16	31	10	5	18	3	–	9	8	13
Infratest dimap	5–7 Aug 2024	1,311	–	15	32	12	5	16	–	–	9	11	16
Verian	31 Jul – 6 Aug 2024	1,449	–	16	31	13	5	16	3	–	7	9	15
INSA	2–5 Aug 2024	2,002	–	15	30.5	10.5	5	17	3	–	9.5	9.5	13.5
Forsa	30 Jul – 5 Aug 2024	2,500	20	15	30	11	5	17	3	3	7	9	13
Ipsos	2–4 Aug 2024	1,000	–	14	30	13	5	16	3	2	8	9	14
INSA	29 Jul – 2 Aug 2024	1,199	–	15	31	10	5	18	3	–	9	9	13
INSA	26–29 Jul 2024	2,006	–	15	30	10	5	18	3.5	–	9.5	9	12
Forsa	23–29 Jul 2024	2,501	21	15	30	11	4	17	3	–	7	13	13
INSA	22–26 Jul 2024	1,203	–	15	30	11	5	18	3	–	10	8	12
INSA	19–22 Jul 2024	2,010	–	15	31	10.5	5	17	3.5	–	9	9	14
Forsa	16–22 Jul 2024	2,504	18	14	31	11	5	17	4	–	7	11	14
INSA	15–19 Jul 2024	1,207	–	15	30	11	5	17	3	–	9	10	13
Allensbach	5–19 Jul 2024	1,003	–	16.5	32	11.5	6	17	–	–	8	9	15
INSA	12–15 Jul 2024	2,500	–	15	31	11.5	5	18	3	–	8.5	8	13
Forsa	9–15 Jul 2024	2,503	18	14	32	11	5	16	3	–	7	12	16
INSA	8–12 Jul 2024	1,449	–	15	30	12	5	18	2	–	9	9	12
Forschungsgruppe Wahlen	9–11 Jul 2024	1,341	15	14	32	13	4	17	3	–	7	10	15
Verian	3–9 Jul 2024	1,486	–	15	31	13	5	16	3	–	7	10	15
INSA	5–8 Jul 2024	2,007	–	15	30.5	11	5.5	17.5	3	1.5	8.5	7.5	13
Forsa	2–8 Jul 2024	2,504	19	14	30	11	5	17	–	–	8	15	13
Ipsos	5–7 Jul 2024	1,000	–	14	30	12	5	16	3	2	8	10	14
INSA	1–5 Jul 2024	1,204	–	15	30	11	5	18	2	–	9	10	12
Infratest dimap	1–3 Jul 2024	1,294	–	14	31	13	5	17	3	–	8	9	14
YouGov	28 Jun – 3 Jul 2024	1,711	–	14	30	12	6	19	3	2	9	6	11
INSA	28 Jun – 1 Jul 2024	2,006	–	15	29.5	12	5.5	17.5	2.5	2	8.5	7.5	12
Forsa	25 Jun – 1 Jul 2024	2,506	18	15	31	11	6	16	–	–	7	14	15
INSA	24–28 Jun 2024	1,203	–	15	30	12	6	17	2	2	9	7	13
Forschungsgruppe Wahlen	25–27 Jun 2024	1,186	11	14	31	13	4	17	3	–	7	11	14
INSA	21–24 Jun 2024	2,008	–	14.5	30.5	11.5	5	17.5	3	2	8.5	7.5	13
Forsa	18–24 Jun 2024	2,505	19	15	31	11	5	16	–	3	7	12	15
INSA	17–21 Jun 2024	1,204	–	15	30	12	5	17	3	2	8	8	13
INSA	14–17 Jun 2024	2,010	–	15	31	11	5	17	3	2	8	8	14
Forsa	11–17 Jun 2024	2,504	–	15	30	12	5	16	–	2	7	12	14
GMS	11–17 Jun 2024	1,007	–	14	31	14	5	18	3	2	6	7	13
INSA	10–15 Jun 2024	1,205	–	16	31	11	5	17	3	2	7	8	14
Allensbach	1–13 Jun 2024	1,084	–	16	32	13	6	15	3	–	7	8	16
Forschungsgruppe Wahlen	10–12 Jun 2024	1,334	15	14	30	14	5	16	–	–	7	14	14
Verian	5–11 Jun 2024	1,425	–	16	30	13	5	17	3	3	6	7	13
INSA	7–10 Jun 2024	2,008	–	15.5	30	12	5	16	3	2.5	7.5	8.5	14
Forsa	4–10 Jun 2024	2,505	22	16	30	13	6	16	–	–	6	13	14
2024 EU Parliament Election	9 Jun 2024	–	–	13.9	30.0	11.9	5.2	15.9	2.7	2.7	6.2	11.5	14.1
INSA	3–7 Jun 2024	1,203	–	16	30	12	5	16	3	3	8	7	14
YouGov	31 May – 5 Jun 2024	1,894	–	14	29	12	4	18	4	2	9	8	11
Ipsos	29 May – 5 Jun 2024	957	–	15	29	13	5	17	3	3	8	7	12
INSA	31 May – 3 Jun 2024	2,002	–	16	30.5	12	5	15.5	3.5	2.5	7.5	7.5	14.5
Forsa	28 May – 3 Jun 2024	2,506	22	17	30	13	6	15	–	–	6	13	13
INSA	27–31 May 2024	1,205	–	16	31	12	5	16	3	3	7	7	15
Infratest dimap	27–29 May 2024	1,479	–	15	31	14	4	18	3	3	5	7	13
INSA	24–27 May 2024	2,004	–	15	30.5	12	5	17	3	2.5	7	8	13.5
Forsa	21–27 May 2024	2,503	22	16	30	13	6	15	–	–	6	14	14
INSA	21–24 May 2024	1,202	–	15	30	13	5	17	3	3	7	7	13
INSA	17–21 May 2024	2,010	–	16	30	12.5	5	17	3	3	7	6.5	13
Wahlkreisprognose	13–19 May 2024	2,500	24	16.5	31	13.5	6	15	3	–	6	9	14.5
Forsa	14–17 May 2024	2,001	–	16	32	14	5	15	–	–	5	13	16
INSA	13–17 May 2024	1,206	–	16	30	12	5	17	3	3	7	7	13
Forschungsgruppe Wahlen	14–16 May 2024	1,247	18	15	31	13	5	16	4	–	5	11	15
Allensbach	4–16 May 2024	1,093	–	17.5	32.5	13	6	14	3	–	8	6	15
Verian	7–14 May 2024	1,506	–	16	30	14	5	16	4	3	5	7	14
INSA	10–13 May 2024	2,087	–	15.5	30.5	13	5	17	3.5	2.5	7	6	13.5
Forsa	7–13 May 2024	2,006	23	16	32	13	5	15	3	–	5	11	16
INSA	6–10 May 2024	1,247	–	15	30	13	5	17	4	2	7	7	13
YouGov	3–8 May 2024	1,749	–	16	30	14	4	19	4	1	7	5	11
INSA	3–6 May 2024	2,006	–	15.5	30.5	12	5	18	3.5	2.5	7.5	5.5	12.5
Forsa	30 Apr – 6 May 2024	2,000	–	16	31	12	6	15	3	–	4	13	15
GMS	30 Apr – 6 May 2024	1,005	–	15	31	14	4	18	2	3	6	7	13
Ipsos	2–5 May 2024	2,000	–	16	28	13	5	18	4	3	7	6	10
INSA	29 Apr – 3 May 2024	1.203	–	15	30	12	5	18	4	2	7	7	12
Infratest dimap	29–30 Apr 2024	1,280	–	15	31	15	5	18	–	–	5	11	13
INSA	26–29 Apr 2024	2.004	–	16.5	29.5	12.5	5	18.5	3.5	2.5	7	5	11
Forsa	23–29 Apr 2024	2,505	23	17	30	12	5	16	3	–	4	13	13
INSA	22–26 Apr 2024	1,203	–	16	29	13	5	18	4	2	7	6	11
Forschungsgruppe Wahlen	23–25 Apr 2024	1,228	18	15	30	15	4	17	4	–	5	10	13
INSA	19–22 Apr 2024	2,008	–	15	30.5	12.5	5	18.5	4	2.5	7	5	12
Forsa	16–22 Apr 2024	2,501	25	16	31	12	5	16	–	–	5	15	15
INSA	15–19 Apr 2024	1,204	–	15	30	13	5	18	4	2	7	6	12
Allensbach	5–18 Apr 2024	1,041	–	16	32.5	15	6	16	3	–	7	4.5	16.5
Verian	10–16 Apr 2024	1,445	–	16	30	14	5	18	3	3	5	6	12
INSA	12–15 Apr 2024	2,006	–	16	29.5	13	6	18.5	3	2.5	6.5	5	11
Forsa	9–15 Apr 2024	2,505	23	16	31	12	5	17	–	–	5	14	14
INSA	8–12 Apr 2024	1,203	–	16	30	13	5	18	3	2	6	7	12
Forschungsgruppe Wahlen	9–11 Apr 2024	1,254	20	16	31	12	4	18	3	–	6	10	13
YouGov	5–10 Apr 2024	1,588	–	14	29	15	5	19	4	1	7	6	10
INSA	5–8 Apr 2024	2,084	–	15	30.5	13	5	18.5	3.5	2.5	6.5	5.5	12
Forsa	2–8 Apr 2024	2,506	24	16	30	13	5	17	–	–	5	14	13
Ipsos	5–7 Apr 2024	2,000	–	15	29	13	5	18	4	3	7	6	11
INSA	2–5 Apr 2024	1,243	–	15	31	13	5	19	3	2	6	6	12
Infratest dimap	2–3 Apr 2024	1,304	–	15	30	15	4	18	3	3	5	7	12
INSA	28 Mar – 2 Apr 2024	2,004	–	15	30	12.5	5	19.5	3.5	2.5	6.5	5.5	10.5
Forsa	26–28 Mar 2024	1,508	24	16	31	13	4	17	–	–	5	14	14
INSA	25–28 Mar 2024	1,210	–	15	30	13	5	20	3	2	6	6	10
INSA	22–25 Mar 2024	2,008	–	15.5	30	12.5	5	19.5	3.5	2.5	6.5	5	10.5
Forsa	19–25 Mar 2024	2,503	24	16	31	13	4	17	3	3	5	8	14
INSA	18–22 Mar 2024	1,204	–	16	30	13	5	19	3	2	6	6	11
Forschungsgruppe Wahlen	19–21 Mar 2024	1,296	19	16	31	13	4	18	3	–	6	9	13
Wahlkreisprognose	18–20 Mar 2024	1,300	25	19.5	29	14	4	15	3.5	–	6.5	8.5	9.5
Verian	13–19 Mar 2024	1,480	–	17	29	15	5	18	3	–	5	8	11
INSA	15–18 Mar 2024	2,002	–	16	29.5	12	5	19.5	3.5	2.5	6.5	5.5	10
Forsa	12–18 Mar 2024	2,500	24	16	31	13	4	17	3	3	5	8	14
INSA	11–15 Mar 2024	1,199	–	15	30	12	5	19	3	2	6	8	11
Allensbach	1–14 Mar 2024	1,027	–	15	34	14	5	16	3	–	7	6	18
INSA	8–11 Mar 2024	2,079	–	14.5	31	12.5	5.5	18.5	3.5	2.5	6.5	5.5	12.5
Forsa	5–11 Mar 2024	2,502	26	15	30	14	5	17	3	3	5	8	13
INSA	4–8 Mar 2024	1,249	–	15	31	12	5	19	3	2	7	6	12
Forschungsgruppe Wahlen	5–7 Mar 2024	1,260	19	15	30	15	4	18	3	3	5	7	12
Infratest dimap	4–6 Mar 2024	1,288	–	16	29	14	5	19	3	–	6	8	10
YouGov	1–5 Mar 2024	1,762	–	15	29	14	4	19	4	1	7	7	10
INSA	1–4 Mar 2024	2,024	–	14.5	30.5	13	5.5	19.5	3	2.5	6.5	5	11
Forsa	27 Feb – 4 Mar 2024	2,506	–	15	31	14	5	17	3	3	4	8	14
Ipsos	1–3 Mar 2024	2,000	–	15	29	14	5	18	3	3	7	6	11
INSA	26 Feb – 1 Mar 2024	1,200	–	15	30	13	5	19	3	3	7	5	11
Verian	21–27 Feb 2024	1,392	–	16	30	15	5	18	3	–	4	9	12
INSA	23–26 Feb 2024	2,006	–	15.5	30.5	13	4.5	19	3	3	7.5	4	11.5
Forsa	20–26 Feb 2024	2,503	–	14	30	15	5	17	3	3	4	9	13
INSA	19–23 Feb 2024	1,203	–	15	30	13	5	19	3	3	8	4	11
Wahlkreisprognose	21–22 Feb 2024	1,300	–	14	28.5	12.5	5.5	19	2	2	8.5	8	9.5
Forschungsgruppe Wahlen	20–22 Feb 2024	1,294	18	15	30	14	4	19	4	–	5	9	11
Verian	14–20 Feb 2024	1,505	–	16	29	15	4	19	3	–	5	9	10
INSA	16–19 Feb 2024	2,007	–	14.5	30.5	12.5	4.5	19.5	3.5	3	7.5	4.5	11
Forsa	13–19 Feb 2024	2,504	24	15	30	14	5	17	3	3	4	9	13
INSA	12–16 Feb 2024	1,203	–	14	31	13	4	19	3	3	8	5	12
Allensbach	3–15 Feb 2024	1,053	–	15	32	14	6	18	3	–	7	5	14
INSA	9–12 Feb 2024	2,083	–	15	30	12.5	3.5	20.5	3.5	3	7.5	4.5	9.5
Forsa	6–12 Feb 2024	2,502	25	15	31	14	4	18	3	–	5	10	13
INSA	5–8 Feb 2024	1,276	–	15	30	13	4	20	3	3	7	5	10
YouGov	2–6 Feb 2024	2,018	–	14	31	12	4	20	3	1	7	6	11
INSA	2–5 Feb 2024	2,004	–	15	30	12.5	4.5	20.5	3.5	3	7.5	3.5	9.5
GMS	31 Jan – 5 Feb 2024	1,012	–	16	32	13	4	18	2	3	5	7	14
Forsa	30 Jan – 5 Feb 2024	2,503	25	15	31	14	4	18	3	3	5	7	13
Ipsos	2–4 Feb 2024	2,000	–	15	30	13	4	18	4	3	8	5	12
INSA	29 Jan – 2 Feb 2024	1,202	–	15	30	13	4	20	4	3	7	4	10
Forschungsgruppe Wahlen	30 Jan – 1 Feb 2024	1,217	20	15	31	13	4	19	3	3	6	6	12
Infratest dimap	29–31 Jan 2024	1,303	–	16	30	14	4	19	3	–	5	9	11
INSA	26–29 Jan 2024	2,002	–	14.5	30	12.5	5	21	3.5	2.5	7	4	9
Forsa	23–29 Jan 2024	2,506	27	15	32	14	3	19	3	3	3	8	13
INSA	22–26 Jan 2024	1,201	–	14	31	13	4	21	4	2	7	4	10
Wahlkreisprognose	22–24 Jan 2024	1,366	26	17.5	30.5	11	4.5	22	2.5	4	–	8	8.5
Wahlkreisprognose	22–24 Jan 2024	1,366	26	15.5	27.5	12.5	6.5	19	2.5	2	9	5.5	8.5
Verian	16–23 Jan 2024	1,922	–	16	29	16	4	19	4	–	3	9	10
Pollytix	19–22 Jan 2024	1,530	–	15	29	12	5	22	4	–	9	4	7
INSA	19–22 Jan 2024	2,006	–	13.5	30.5	12.5	5	21.5	3	2.5	–	11.5	8
Forsa	16–22 Jan 2024	2,503	–	14	31	14	4	20	4	3	3	7	11
INSA	15–19 Jan 2024	1,203	–	13	30	13	5	22	3	3	7	4	8
Allensbach	5–18 Jan 2024	1,018	–	15	34	13.5	6	19.5	4	3	–	5	14.5
INSA	12–15 Jan 2024	2,004	–	14	31	12	5	23	4	3	–	8	8
Forsa	9–15 Jan 2024	2,504	–	13	31	14	4	22	4	3	–	9	9
INSA	11–12 Jan 2024	1,002	–	14	27	12	4	18	3	3	14	5	9
INSA	8–12 Jan 2024	1,202	–	15	30	12	5	22	4	3	–	9	8
Verian	9–11 Jan 2024	1,359	–	14	31	16	4	22	4	3	–	6	9
Forschungsgruppe Wahlen	9–11 Jan 2024	1,337	21	13	31	14	4	22	4	4	4	4	9
INSA	5–8 Jan 2024	2,008	–	16	32	12	5	23	4	3	–	5	9
YouGov	3–8 Jan 2024	1,614	–	15	29	12	6	24	5	2	–	7	5
Forsa	2–8 Jan 2024	2,502	–	15	30	14	4	22	4	3	–	8	8
Ipsos	5–7 Jan 2024	2,000	–	15	30	13	6	22	5	–	–	9	8
INSA	2–5 Jan 2024	1,204	–	16	31	12	5	23	4	3	–	6	8
Wahlkreisprognose	2–4 Jan 2024	1,500	24	12	34	10.5	4.5	24.5	3	4	–	7.5	9.5
Infratest dimap	2–3 Jan 2024	1,321	–	14	31	13	5	22	4	3	–	8	9
INSA	29 Dec – 2 Jan 2024	2,002	–	15	32	13	5	22.5	4	3	–	5.5	9.5
GMS	27 Dec – 2 Jan 2024	1,004	–	14	33	13	6	23	3	3	–	5	10
2021 federal election	26 Sep 2021	–	23.4	25.7	24.2	14.7	11.4	10.4	4.9	2.4	–	6.3	1.6

=== 2023 ===
Polling firm	Fieldwork date	Sample size	Abs.	SPD	Union	Grüne	FDP	AfD	Linke	FW	Others	Lead
INSA	28–29 Dec 2023	1,001	–	15	32	12	5	23	4	3	6	9
INSA	22–27 Dec 2023	2,000	–	15	32	12	5	23	4	3	6	9
Forsa	19–22 Dec 2023	–	–	14	31	14	5	22	3	–	11	9
INSA	18–22 Dec 2023	1,202	–	15	32	12	5	22	4	3	7	10
Infratest dimap	18–20 Dec 2023	1,210	–	14	32	14	5	21	3	4	7	11
Verian	13–19 Dec 2023	1,421	–	15	31	15	4	21	4	–	10	10
INSA	15–18 Dec 2023	2,002	–	15.5	31.5	12.5	5	23	4	2.5	6	8.5
Forsa	12–18 Dec 2023	2,501	26	14	31	13	5	23	3	–	11	8
INSA	11–15 Dec 2023	1,202	–	15	32	12	5	23	4	2	7	9
Forschungsgruppe Wahlen	12–14 Dec 2023	1,146	21	14	32	14	5	22	4	3	6	10
Allensbach	1–14 Dec 2023	1,013	–	17	34	15	5	18	3.5	3	4.5	16
Verian	6–12 Dec 2023	1,515	–	15	30	16	5	20	4	–	10	10
INSA	8–11 Dec 2023	2,008	–	16	30	12.5	6	22.5	4	3	6	7.5
GMS	6–11 Dec 2023	1,001	–	14	32	15	5	22	2	3	7	10
Forsa	5–11 Dec 2023	2,501	27	14	31	13	5	22	4	–	11	9
INSA	4–8 Dec 2023	1,203	–	16	30	12	6	22	4	3	7	8
Infratest dimap	4–6 Dec 2023	1,364	–	14	32	15	4	21	3	3	8	11
YouGov	1–6 Dec 2023	1,669	–	14	30	14	6	23	4	2	7	7
Verian	29 Nov – 5 Dec 2023	1,402	–	14	30	17	4	20	4	–	11	10
INSA	1–4 Dec 2023	2,006	–	15.5	29.5	13	6	22.5	3.5	3	7	7
Forsa	28 Nov – 4 Dec 2023	2,501	–	14	30	14	5	22	4	–	11	8
Ipsos	1–3 Dec 2023	2,000	–	16	29	13	6	21	5	–	10	8
INSA	27 Nov – 1 Dec 2023	1,202	–	16	30	13	6	22	3	3	7	8
Verian	20–28 Nov 2023	1,806	–	17	29	16	5	19	4	–	10	10
Wahlkreisprognose	25–27 Nov 2023	1,200	25	15	31	13	5	26	3.5	–	6.5	5
INSA	24–27 Nov 2023	2,007	–	15.5	30.5	12.5	6	22	4	3	6.5	8.5
Forsa	21–27 Nov 2023	2,500	25	14	30	15	5	21	4	–	11	9
INSA	20–24 Nov 2023	1,202	–	16	30	12	6	22	4	3	7	8
Forschungsgruppe Wahlen	21–23 Nov 2023	1,242	22	15	31	15	5	22	4	–	8	9
Verian	14–21 Nov 2023	1,452	–	16	29	17	5	20	4	–	9	9
INSA	17–20 Nov 2023	2,003	–	16.5	30	13	5.5	21	4.5	3	6.5	9
Forsa	14–20 Nov 2023	2,501	26	15	30	14	5	21	3	3	9	9
INSA	13–17 Nov 2023	1,201	–	16	30	13	6	21	4	3	7	9
Allensbach	1–16 Nov 2023	1,047	–	17	32	13.5	6	19	3.5	4	5	13
Verian	8–14 Nov 2023	1,421	–	16	28	16	6	20	4	–	10	8
INSA	10–13 Nov 2023	2,008	–	16.5	30.5	13.5	5	21.5	4.5	3	5.5	9
Forsa	7–13 Nov 2023	2,504	–	14	30	14	5	21	4	3	9	9
INSA	6–10 Nov 2023	1,204	–	17	30	14	5	21	4	3	6	9
Forschungsgruppe Wahlen	7–9 Nov 2023	1,234	21	16	30	15	5	21	4	3	6	9
Infratest dimap	7–8 Nov 2023	1,195	–	15	30	15	5	21	4	3	7	9
YouGov	3–7 Nov 2023	1,732	–	15	29	15	5	22	5	2	7	7
Kantar	1–7 Nov 2023	1,443	–	16	28	16	6	20	4	3	7	8
INSA	3–6 Nov 2023	2,006	–	16.5	29.5	13.5	5.5	22	4.5	3	5.5	7.5
Forsa	31 Oct – 6 Nov 2023	2,502	–	15	29	14	5	21	4	3	9	8
Ipsos	3–5 Nov 2023	2,000	–	17	28	15	6	20	5	–	9	8
INSA	30 Oct – 3 Nov 2023	1,204	–	16	30	13	6	22	4	3	6	8
Infratest dimap	30 Oct – 1 Nov 2023	1,314	–	16	30	14	4	22	5	3	6	8
Kantar	25–31 Oct 2023	1,418	–	17	27	16	5	21	4	–	10	6
INSA	27–30 Oct 2023	2,010	–	16.5	30.5	13	5.5	21	4	3.5	6	9.5
Forsa	24–30 Oct 2023	2,501	26	15	29	14	5	22	3	3	9	7
INSA	23–27 Oct 2023	1,216	–	16	31	13	6	21	4	3	6	10
Wahlkreisprognose	23–25 Oct 2023	1,300	24	14.5	30	14	6	22	4	–	9.5	8
Kantar	18–24 Oct 2023	1,422	–	16	28	16	5	20	5	–	10	8
INSA	20–23 Oct 2023	2,004	–	16.5	28.5	13	5.5	22	5	3.5	6	6.5
Forsa	17–23 Oct 2023	2,504	–	14	31	14	5	21	4	3	8	10
INSA	16–20 Oct 2023	1,202	–	16	29	13	5	22	5	4	6	7
Forschungsgruppe Wahlen	17–19 Oct 2023	1,252	21	15	30	14	5	21	5	3	7	9
Allensbach	6–19 Oct 2023	1,010	–	17	34	13	5	19	3	4	5	15
Kantar	11–17 Oct 2023	1,388	–	14	31	15	5	21	4	3	7	10
INSA	13–16 Oct 2023	2,006	–	16.5	28	13	6	23	4.5	4	5	5
Forsa	10–16 Oct 2023	2,501	22	14	32	14	4	21	4	3	8	11
INSA	9–13 Oct 2023	1,202	–	17	28	13	6	23	5	4	4	5
Infratest dimap	10–11 Oct 2023	1,203	–	15	29	13	5	23	4	4	5	6
YouGov	6–10 Oct 2023	1,842	–	16	29	15	5	21	6	2	5	8
Kantar	4–10 Oct 2023	1,386	–	16	27	15	6	22	5	3	6	5
INSA	6–9 Oct 2023	2,001	–	17	27	13.5	6	22.5	5	3	6	4.5
Forsa	4–9 Oct 2023	2,003	–	18	28	14	6	20	4	–	10	8
Ipsos	6–8 Oct 2023	2,000	–	17	26	14	7	22	5	–	9	4
INSA	2–6 Oct 2023	1,201	–	17	27	14	6	22	5	3	6	5
INSA	29 Sep – 2 Oct 2023	2,010	–	18	26.5	13.5	7	22	5	2.5	5.5	4.5
Forsa	26–29 Sep 2023	2,004	25	18	28	14	5	20	4	–	11	8
INSA	25–29 Sep 2023	1,206	–	18	26	14	7	22	5	3	5	4
Kantar	26–28 Sep 2023	1,391	–	16	26	16	7	21	5	–	9	5
Infratest dimap	25–27 Sep 2023	1,302	–	16	28	14	6	22	4	3	7	6
Kantar	20–26 Sep 2023	1,356	–	16	27	15	7	21	5	–	9	6
Wahlkreisprognose	24–25 Sep 2023	1,200	24	18.5	24	15	6.5	23	3.5	–	9.5	1
INSA	22–25 Sep 2023	2,003	–	17.5	27	13.5	6.5	21.5	5	3	6	5.5
Forsa	19–25 Sep 2023	2,503	27	17	27	14	6	21	4	–	11	6
INSA	18–22 Sep 2023	1,203	–	17	27	14	6	22	5	3	6	5
Kantar	13–19 Sep 2023	1,370	–	17	27	15	7	21	4	–	9	6
INSA	15–18 Sep 2023	2,008	–	17	26.5	14.5	6	21	5	3.5	6.5	5.5
GMS	13–18 Sep 2023	1,002	–	16	27	15	6	23	4	–	9	4
Forsa	12–18 Sep 2023	2,504	27	17	27	14	6	22	4	–	10	5
INSA	11–15 Sep 2023	1,204	–	17	27	15	6	21	5	3	6	6
Allensbach	4–15 Sep 2023	1,030	–	18	30	14	7	19	5	–	7	11
Forschungsgruppe Wahlen	12–14 Sep 2023	1,201	21	17	26	16	6	21	5	3	6	5
Infratest dimap	12–13 Sep 2023	1,222	–	16	28	15	7	22	4	–	8	6
Kantar	6–12 Sep 2023	1,442	–	16	26	15	7	22	5	–	9	4
INSA	8–11 Sep 2023	2,002	–	18	26.5	14	7	22	4.5	–	8	4.5
Forsa	5–11 Sep 2023	2,505	28	17	27	13	7	21	4	–	11	6
INSA	4–8 Sep 2023	1,201	–	18	27	13	7	22	5	–	8	5
YouGov	1–6 Sep 2023	1,833	–	16	29	14	5	23	5	1	8	6
Kantar	30 Aug – 5 Sep 2023	1,441	–	17	26	15	6	21	5	–	10	5
INSA	1–4 Sep 2023	2,010	–	17.5	26.5	13.5	7.5	21.5	4.5	–	9	5
Forsa	29 Aug – 4 Sep 2023	2,506	–	16	27	14	7	21	4	–	11	6
Ipsos	1–3 Sep 2023	2,000	–	17	26	14	8	21	6	–	8	5
INSA	28 Aug – 1 Sep 2023	1,195	–	18	27	13	7	21	5	–	9	6
Infratest dimap	28–30 Aug 2023	1,310	–	16	29	14	6	22	4	–	9	7
Kantar	23–29 Aug 2023	1,330	–	18	25	15	7	20	5	–	10	5
INSA	25–28 Aug 2023	2,006	–	18	26.5	14.5	7	21	4.5	–	8.5	5.5
Forsa	22–28 Aug 2023	2,504	29	17	26	14	7	21	4	–	11	5
Wahlkreisprognose	22–27 Aug 2023	1,200	26	20.5	25	13	7.5	22	4	–	8	3
INSA	21–25 Aug 2023	1,285	–	18	27	14	7	21	5	–	8	6
Kantar	16–22 Aug 2023	1,426	–	18	26	14	7	20	5	–	10	6
INSA	18–21 Aug 2023	2,008	–	18.5	26.5	14	8	20.5	5	–	7.5	6
Forsa	15–21 Aug 2023	2,506	29	18	26	14	7	20	4	–	11	6
INSA	14–18 Aug 2023	1,203	–	18	27	14	8	21	5	–	7	6
Forschungsgruppe Wahlen	15–17 Aug 2023	1,288	26	19	26	15	7	20	5	–	8	6
Infratest dimap	15–16 Aug 2023	1,216	–	17	27	14	7	21	4	–	10	6
Allensbach	4–16 Aug 2023	1,026	–	19	29	14	7	19	5	–	7	10
Kantar	9–15 Aug 2023	1,426	–	18	26	15	7	19	5	–	10	7
INSA	11–14 Aug 2023	2,002	–	19.5	26	13.5	7	21	4.5	–	8.5	5
Forsa	8–14 Aug 2023	2,501	28	17	25	15	7	21	4	–	11	4
INSA	7–11 Aug 2023	1,200	–	20	26	13	7	21	5	–	8	5
GMS	2–9 Aug 2023	1,004	–	17	27	14	7	21	4	–	10	6
Kantar	2–8 Aug 2023	1,330	–	19	27	16	6	18	6	–	8	8
INSA	4–7 Aug 2023	2,004	–	19	27	14.5	7.5	20.5	4.5	–	7	6.5
Forsa	1–7 Aug 2023	2,502	28	17	25	15	7	21	4	–	11	4
Ipsos	4–6 Aug 2023	1,000	–	17	26	15	8	22	5	–	7	4
INSA	31 Jul – 4 Aug 2023	1,203	–	19	27	14	7	21	5	–	7	6
Infratest dimap	31 Jul – 2 Aug 2023	1,297	–	17	27	15	7	21	4	–	9	6
Kantar	26 Jul – 1 Aug 2023	1,310	–	19	27	16	6	19	5	–	8	8
YouGov	25 Jul – 2 Aug 2023	1,756	–	17	27	14	5	23	6	1	7	4
INSA	28–31 Jul 2023	2,003	–	18.5	26.5	14	6.5	21.5	5	–	8	5
Forsa	25–31 Jul 2023	2,500	28	17	25	15	6	21	5	–	11	4
INSA	24–28 Jul 2023	1,200	–	18	26	14	7	22	5	–	8	4
Wahlkreisprognose	26–27 Jul 2023	1,525	23	20.5	25	13	7	20.5	4.5	3	6.5	4.5
Kantar	19–25 Jul 2023	1,402	–	18	27	16	6	20	5	–	8	7
INSA	21–24 Jul 2023	2,006	–	18.5	26.5	14	7.5	21.5	4.5	–	7.5	5
Forsa	18–24 Jul 2023	2,504	28	18	27	14	6	19	5	–	11	8
INSA	17–21 Jul 2023	1,266	–	18	26	14	7	22	5	–	8	4
Infratest dimap	18–19 Jul 2023	1,235	–	18	28	13	7	20	4	–	10	8
Allensbach	7–19 Jul 2023	1,011	–	19	29	16	7	18	4	–	7	10
Kantar	12–18 Jul 2023	1,403	–	18	26	16	7	20	5	–	8	6
INSA	14–17 Jul 2023	2,004	–	18	27	14	7	20.5	5	–	8.5	6.5
Forsa	11–17 Jul 2023	2,502	26	18	26	15	7	20	4	–	10	6
INSA	10–14 Jul 2023	1,184	–	18	27	14	7	20	5	–	9	7
Forschungsgruppe Wahlen	11–13 Jul 2023	1,347	27	17	27	16	7	20	4	–	9	7
Kantar	5–11 Jul 2023	1,393	–	19	26	15	7	20	5	–	8	6
INSA	7–10 Jul 2023	2,008	–	19	26	14	7	20.5	5	–	8.5	5.5
Ipsos	7–9 Jul 2023	1,000	–	18	26	14	7	22	5	–	8	4
Forsa	4–7 Jul 2023	2,003	25	18	27	14	7	19	5	–	10	8
INSA	3–7 Jul 2023	1,204	–	19	27	13	7	20	5	–	9	7
Infratest dimap	3–5 Jul 2023	1,305	–	18	28	14	7	20	4	–	9	8
YouGov	30 Jun – 4 Jul 2023	1,694	–	18	27	14	6	21	6	1	6	6
Kantar	28 Jun – 4 Jul 2023	1,403	–	18	27	15	6	20	5	–	9	7
INSA	30 Jun – 3 Jul 2023	2,897	–	19	25.5	14.5	6.5	21	5	–	8.5	4.5
GMS	28 Jun – 3 Jul 2023	1,005	–	17	28	14	7	20	4	–	10	8
Forsa	27 Jun – 3 Jul 2023	2,501	25	18	27	15	6	19	5	–	10	8
INSA	26–30 Jun 2023	1,401	–	19	26	14	7	20	5	–	9	6
Forschungsgruppe Wahlen	27–29 Jun 2023	1,379	24	18	28	16	6	19	5	–	8	9
Kantar	20–27 Jun 2023	1,408	–	18	26	15	7	19	5	–	10	7
INSA	23–26 Jun 2023	2,004	–	19.5	26.5	13.5	6.5	20.5	4.5	–	9	6
Forsa	20–26 Jun 2023	2,506	25	18	27	15	7	19	4	–	10	8
Wahlkreisprognose	22–25 Jun 2023	1,399	25	21	24	14.5	6	21	4.5	–	9	3
INSA	19–23 Jun 2023	1,203	–	20	26	13	7	20	4	–	10	6
Allensbach	9–22 Jun 2023	1,039	–	19	31	15	8	17	4	–	6	12
Infratest dimap	20–21 Jun 2023	1,191	–	17	29	15	6	19	4	–	10	10
Kantar	14–20 Jun 2023	1,406	–	19	27	15	7	20	4	–	8	7
INSA	16–19 Jun 2023	2,006	–	20	26.5	13.5	7.5	20	4.5	–	8	6.5
Forsa	13–19 Jun 2023	2,503	25	18	27	15	7	19	4	–	10	8
INSA	12–16 Jun 2023	1,203	–	20	27	13	8	19	4	–	9	7
Civey	9–16 Jun 2023	10,031	–	19	25	16	7	20	5	–	8	5
Forschungsgruppe Wahlen	13–15 Jun 2023	1,224	21	19	28	16	6	18	5	–	8	9
Kantar	6–13 Jun 2023	1,387	–	20	27	15	6	19	5	–	8	7
INSA	9–12 Jun 2023	2,003	–	20	27	13	8	19.5	4.5	–	8	7
Forsa	6–12 Jun 2023	2,504	24	18	29	14	7	19	4	–	9	10
INSA	5–9 Jun 2023	1,201	–	20	27	13	8	19	5	–	8	7
YouGov	2–7 Jun 2023	1,628	–	19	28	13	5	20	6	1	7	8
Kantar	31 May – 6 Jun 2023	1,402	–	20	27	15	7	18	5	–	8	7
INSA	2–5 Jun 2023	2,009	–	19	26.5	13.5	9	19	5	–	8	7.5
GMS	31 May – 5 Jun 2023	1,001	–	18	29	15	7	19	4	–	8	10
Forsa	30 May – 5 Jun 2023	2,505	23	18	30	14	7	17	4	–	10	12
Ipsos	2–4 Jun 2023	1,000	–	20	28	13	8	19	6	–	6	8
Wahlkreisprognose	1–2 Jun 2023	1,100	24	21	27	13	8	19	4	–	8	6
INSA	30 May – 2 Jun 2023	1,205	–	19	27	13	9	19	5	–	8	8
Infratest dimap	30–31 May 2023	1,302	–	18	29	15	7	18	4	–	9	11
INSA	26–30 May 2023	2,004	–	20.5	28	13	8.5	18	4.5	–	7.5	7.5
Kantar	23–30 May 2023	1,379	–	20	27	15	8	17	5	–	8	7
Forsa	23–26 May 2023	2,001	23	18	29	14	7	17	5	–	10	11
INSA	22–26 May 2023	1,207	–	20	28	13	9	18	4	–	8	8
Forschungsgruppe Wahlen	23–25 May 2023	1,257	24	20	28	16	6	17	5	–	8	8
Kantar	16–23 May 2023	1,321	–	18	29	15	8	16	5	–	9	11
INSA	19–22 May 2023	2,004	–	20.5	27.5	14	8.5	17	5	–	7.5	7
Forsa	16–22 May 2023	2,003	–	18	30	14	7	16	5	–	10	12
INSA	15–19 May 2023	1,195	–	21	28	14	8	17	5	–	7	7
Kantar	9–16 May 2023	1,401	–	18	28	16	8	16	5	–	9	10
INSA	12–15 May 2023	2,010	–	20	28	14.5	8.5	16.5	5	–	7.5	8
Forsa	9–15 May 2023	2,503	25	17	30	15	8	16	4	–	10	13
INSA	8–12 May 2023	1,205	–	20	28	15	9	16	4	–	8	8
Infratest dimap	9–10 May 2023	1,220	–	18	28	16	8	16	5	–	9	10
Allensbach	28 Apr – 10 May 2023	1,001	–	18	32	16	8	15	5	–	6	14
YouGov	5–9 May 2023	1,700	–	16	31	16	5	17	6	2	7	14
Kantar	3–9 May 2023	1,405	–	18	29	17	8	16	5	–	7	11
INSA	5–8 May 2023	2,008	–	20	28	14	9	16.5	4.5	–	8	8
Forsa	2–8 May 2023	2,505	–	18	29	16	7	16	4	–	10	11
Ipsos	5–7 May 2023	1,000	–	19	29	15	8	16	5	–	8	10
INSA	2–5 May 2023	1,204	–	20	28	14	9	16	4	–	9	8
Forschungsgruppe Wahlen	2–4 May 2023	1,225	28	19	30	17	6	15	5	–	8	11
Infratest dimap	2–3 May 2023	1,360	–	17	30	16	7	16	5	–	9	13
INSA	28 Apr – 2 May 2023	2,006	–	21	27	15	8	16.5	4.5	–	8	6
Kantar	26 Apr – 2 May 2023	1,394	–	17	31	16	8	16	4	–	8	14
Wahlkreisprognose	26–30 Apr 2023	1,400	24	21	27.5	14	10.5	15	3.5	–	8.5	6.5
Forsa	25–28 Apr 2023	2,007	–	17	30	16	7	16	4	–	10	13
INSA	24–28 Apr 2023	1,202	–	21	28	14	8	16	5	–	8	7
Kantar	18–25 Apr 2023	1,426	–	18	30	16	7	16	5	–	8	12
INSA	21–24 Apr 2023	2,004	–	20	27.5	14.5	9	16	4.5	–	8.5	7.5
Forsa	18–24 Apr 2023	2,506	23	18	30	16	7	15	4	–	10	12
INSA	17–21 Apr 2023	1,202	–	20	28	15	9	16	4	–	8	8
Forschungsgruppe Wahlen	18–20 Apr 2023	1,266	24	18	31	18	6	15	4	–	8	13
Kantar	12–18 Apr 2023	1,407	–	19	29	17	7	15	4	–	9	10
Allensbach	3–18 Apr 2023	1,007	–	20	31	15	7.5	16	5	–	5.5	11
INSA	14–17 Apr 2023	2,008	–	21	27.5	15	8	16	4.5	–	8	6.5
Forsa	11–17 Apr 2023	2,508	24	18	29	17	7	15	4	–	10	11
INSA	11–14 Apr 2023	1,204	–	21	27	15	8	16	5	–	8	6
Infratest dimap	11–12 Apr 2023	1,204	–	19	29	17	7	15	4	–	9	10
INSA	6–11 Apr 2023	2,005	–	20	27.5	15.5	8	16	4.5	–	8.5	7.5
Kantar	5–11 Apr 2023	1,367	–	21	27	17	8	14	5	–	8	6
Forsa	4–6 Apr 2023	1,501	25	18	30	18	7	14	4	–	10	12
INSA	3–6 Apr 2023	1,204	–	20	28	16	8	16	4	–	8	8
Infratest dimap	3–5 Apr 2023	1,304	–	18	30	17	7	15	4	–	9	12
Ipsos	3–4 Apr 2023	1,000	–	21	27	17	8	15	4	–	8	6
YouGov	30 Mar – 4 Apr 2023	1,522	–	20	30	15	6	17	6	1	6	10
Kantar	29 Mar – 4 Apr 2023	1,269	–	20	27	18	8	14	5	–	8	7
INSA	31 Mar – 3 Apr 2023	2,007	–	20	28	15.5	7.5	16	4.5	–	8.5	8
GMS	29 Mar – 3 Apr 2023	1,007	–	19	31	17	6	15	4	–	8	12
Forsa	28 Mar – 3 Apr 2023	2,502	25	18	29	18	7	14	4	–	10	11
INSA	27–31 Mar 2023	1,200	–	21	27	16	8	16	4	–	8	6
Forschungsgruppe Wahlen	28–30 Mar 2023	1,379	25	19	30	17	7	15	5	–	7	11
Kantar	21–28 Mar 2023	1,387	–	18	28	19	7	15	4	–	9	10
INSA	24–27 Mar 2023	2,004	–	20.5	28	16	8	15.5	4	–	8	7.5
Forsa	21–27 Mar 2023	2,506	24	19	29	18	6	14	4	–	10	10
Wahlkreisprognose	23–26 Mar 2023	1,200	23	23	26.5	15	7.5	13.5	4	–	10.5	3.5
INSA	20–24 Mar 2023	1,203	–	21	28	16	8	15	4	–	8	7
Kantar	14–21 Mar 2023	1,504	–	18	28	18	7	15	5	–	9	10
INSA	17–20 Mar 2023	2,006	–	21.5	28	15	7.5	16	5	–	7	6.5
Forsa	14–20 Mar 2023	2,503	23	19	29	18	6	14	5	–	9	10
INSA	13–17 Mar 2023	1,202	–	21	28	15	8	16	5	–	7	7
Forschungsgruppe Wahlen	14–16 Mar 2023	1,146	24	21	29	19	5	14	5	–	7	8
Infratest dimap	14–15 Mar 2023	1,215	–	18	30	16	7	15	5	–	9	12
Allensbach	2–15 Mar 2023	1,101	–	21	31	16	6.5	15	4.5	–	6	10
Kantar	8–14 Mar 2023	1,432	–	19	28	18	7	15	5	–	8	9
INSA	10–13 Mar 2023	2,002	–	21.5	28.5	15.5	7.5	16	4	–	7	7
Forsa	7–13 Mar 2023	2,505	22	20	29	17	6	14	5	–	9	9
INSA	6–10 Mar 2023	1,268	–	21	29	16	7	15	4	–	8	8
YouGov	3–7 Mar 2023	1,649	–	20	28	16	6	17	7	1	6	8
Kantar	1–7 Mar 2023	1,504	–	19	29	19	7	13	5	–	8	10
INSA	3–6 Mar 2023	2,007	–	20	29.5	15.5	7.5	15.5	5	–	7	9.5
Forsa	28 Feb – 6 Mar 2023	2,504	–	20	31	17	5	13	5	–	9	11
Ipsos	3–4 Mar 2023	1,000	–	20	27	18	7	15	5	–	8	7
INSA	27 Feb – 3 Mar 2023	1,203	–	20	30	16	7	15	5	–	7	10
Forschungsgruppe Wahlen	28 Feb – 2 Mar 2023	1,165	24	21	29	18	5	15	5	–	7	8
Infratest dimap	27 Feb – 1 Mar 2023	1,311	–	18	31	17	6	14	5	–	9	13
Wahlkreisprognose	27 Feb – 1 Mar 2023	1,419	25	23.5	32	15.5	5	14	3	–	7	8.5
Kantar	21–28 Feb 2023	1,722	–	20	28	18	6	14	6	–	8	8
INSA	24–27 Feb 2023	2,010	–	20.5	29.5	15.5	7.5	15.5	4.5	–	7	9
Forsa	21–27 Feb 2023	2,501	22	20	31	17	5	13	5	–	9	11
INSA	20–24 Feb 2023	1,200	–	21	29	16	7	15	5	–	7	8
Kantar	14–21 Feb 2023	1,373	–	21	29	17	6	15	5	–	7	8
INSA	17–20 Feb 2023	2,006	–	21.5	29	15.5	7	15.5	5	–	6.5	7.5
GMS	15–20 Feb 2023	1,004	–	19	29	17	7	15	5	–	8	10
Forsa	14–20 Feb 2023	2,510	–	19	31	17	6	13	5	–	9	12
INSA	13–17 Feb 2023	1,207	–	21	29	16	7	16	5	–	6	8
Forschungsgruppe Wahlen	14–16 Feb 2023	1,361	25	20	30	19	5	14	5	–	7	10
Infratest dimap	14–15 Feb 2023	1,216	–	19	29	17	6	15	5	–	9	10
Kantar	8–14 Feb 2023	1,386	–	21	26	18	7	15	5	–	8	5
INSA	10–13 Feb 2023	2,005	–	20	28	16	7.5	16	5	–	7.5	8
Forsa	7–13 Feb 2023	2,505	23	21	28	18	6	13	5	–	9	7
INSA	6–10 Feb 2023	1,457	–	20	28	16	8	16	5	–	7	8
YouGov	3–9 Feb 2023	1,736	–	19	27	16	6	17	6	2	7	8
Allensbach	27 Jan – 9 Feb 2023	1,088	–	22.5	30	16	7.5	14	4	–	6	7.5
Kantar	31 Jan – 7 Feb 2023	1,410	–	21	25	19	7	15	5	–	8	4
INSA	3–6 Feb 2023	2,008	–	21	27	16	8	15.5	5	–	7.5	6
Forsa	31 Jan – 6 Feb 2023	2,502	24	21	28	18	7	13	5	–	8	7
Ipsos	3 Feb 2023	1,000	–	20	26	17	8	16	5	–	8	6
INSA	30 Jan – 3 Feb 2023	1,462	–	21	28	16	8	15	5	–	7	7
Infratest dimap	30 Jan – 1 Feb 2023	1,328	–	20	27	18	7	15	4	–	9	7
Kantar	25–31 Jan 2023	1,405	–	21	25	19	7	15	5	–	8	4
INSA	27–30 Jan 2023	2,007	–	20.5	28.5	16	7.5	15	5	–	7.5	8
Forsa	24–30 Jan 2023	2,503	–	20	27	19	7	13	5	–	9	7
Wahlkreisprognose	26–27 Jan 2023	1,421	26	24	24	18	6.5	14.5	3.5	–	9.5	Tie
INSA	24–27 Jan 2023	1,506	–	20	29	16	7	15	5	–	8	9
Forschungsgruppe Wahlen	24–26 Jan 2023	1,345	26	21	27	19	6	15	6	–	6	6
Kantar	18–24 Jan 2023	1,392	–	21	27	19	7	14	5	–	7	6
INSA	20–23 Jan 2023	2,009	–	20.5	28	16.5	7.5	15	4.5	–	8	7.5
Forsa	17–23 Jan 2023	2,502	23	19	28	20	7	12	5	–	9	8
INSA	16–21 Jan 2023	1,504	–	20	28	16	7	15	5	–	9	8
Infratest dimap	17–18 Jan 2023	1,211	–	19	29	19	6	14	4	–	9	10
Allensbach	5–18 Jan 2023	1,023	–	21	31	17	6	14	4.5	–	6.5	10
Kantar	11–17 Jan 2023	1,418	–	20	27	20	6	14	5	–	8	7
Wahlkreisprognose	15–16 Jan 2023	1,500	–	21.5	24.5	17	8	16.5	3.5	–	9	3
INSA	13–16 Jan 2023	2,006	–	21	28	16.5	7.5	15	5	–	7	7
Forsa	10–16 Jan 2023	2,500	24	18	28	20	7	13	5	–	9	8
INSA	9–13 Jan 2023	1,202	–	20	27	17	8	15	5	–	8	7
Forschungsgruppe Wahlen	10–12 Jan 2023	1,259	26	20	27	21	6	14	6	–	6	6
Civey	5–12 Jan 2023	10,065	–	18	28	20	7	14	5	–	8	8
Ipsos	9–10 Jan 2023	1,000	–	19	27	18	7	15	6	–	8	8
YouGov	6–10 Jan 2023	1,561	–	18	27	17	8	16	6	1	6	9
Kantar	4–10 Jan 2023	1,398	–	19	28	18	7	14	4	–	10	9
INSA	6–9 Jan 2023	2,006	–	20	27	17.5	7.5	15	5	–	8	7
Forsa	3–9 Jan 2023	2,502	23	18	29	20	7	13	5	–	8	9
INSA	2–6 Jan 2023	1,465	–	20	27	18	7	15	5	–	8	7
Infratest dimap	2–4 Jan 2023	1,314	–	18	29	19	6	15	5	–	8	10
GMS	28 Dec – 3 Jan 2023	1,002	–	19	29	17	7	14	5	–	9	10
INSA	29 Dec – 2 Jan 2023	2,010	–	20	27	17.5	7.5	15	4.5	–	8.5	7
2021 federal election	26 Sep 2021	–	23.4	25.7	24.2	14.7	11.4	10.4	4.9	2.4	6.3	1.6

=== 2022 ===
Polling firm	Fieldwork date	Sample size	Abs.	SPD	Union	Grüne	FDP	AfD	Linke	FW	Others	Lead
INSA	27–29 Dec 2022	1,205	–	20	26	18	7	15	5	−	9	6
INSA	19–22 Dec 2022	1,203	–	21	27	17	8	14	5	−	8	6
YouGov	16–21 Dec 2022	1,608	–	19	30	17	7	14	5	1	8	11
INSA	16–19 Dec 2022	2,005	–	21	27.5	17.5	7.5	14.5	4.5	−	7.5	6.5
Forsa	13–19 Dec 2022	2,503	24	19	28	19	7	13	5	−	9	9
INSA	12–16 Dec 2022	1,501	–	21	27	18	7	15	5	−	7	6
Kantar	13–15 Dec 2022	1,717	–	19	29	18	7	14	5	−	8	10
Forschungsgruppe Wahlen	12–15 Dec 2022	1,365	22	20	28	20	6	15	5	−	6	8
Allensbach	2–15 Dec 2022	1,035	–	22	30	18	7.5	12	4.5	−	6	8
INSA	9–12 Dec 2022	2,007	–	20	28.5	18	7	15.5	4.5	−	6.5	8.5
Kantar	7–12 Dec 2022	1,429	–	18	28	19	7	14	5	−	9	9
Forsa	6–12 Dec 2022	2,506	24	19	29	19	7	12	5	−	9	10
Wahlkreisprognose	7–9 Dec 2022	1,500	–	22.5	25	16.5	7	14.5	4	−	10.5	2.5
INSA	2–9 Dec 2022	1,502	–	20	28	18	7	15	4	−	8	8
Infratest dimap	6–7 Dec 2022	1,259	–	18	29	18	6	15	5	−	9	11
Kantar	30 Nov – 6 Dec 2022	1,443	–	19	27	19	6	15	5	−	9	8
INSA	3–5 Dec 2022	2,008	–	20.5	28	17	7	14.5	5	−	8	7.5
Forsa	29 Nov – 5 Dec 2022	2,500	25	19	29	19	7	12	5	−	9	10
Ipsos	2–3 Dec 2022	1,000	–	19	27	19	7	14	6	−	8	8
INSA	28 Nov – 2 Dec 2022	1,502	–	20	28	17	7	15	5	−	8	8
Civey	25 Nov – 2 Dec 2022	10,016	–	19	28	21	7	13	4	−	8	7
GMS	28 Nov – 1 Dec 2022	1,005	–	18	28	21	7	12	4	−	10	7
Infratest dimap	28–30 Nov 2022	1,318	–	18	30	18	5	15	5	−	9	12
Kantar	22–29 Nov 2022	1,414	–	18	27	20	7	14	5	−	9	7
INSA	25–28 Nov 2022	2,006	–	21	27	17.5	7	15	5	−	7.5	6
Forsa	22–28 Nov 2022	2,505	24	19	29	20	6	12	5	−	9	9
INSA	21–25 Nov 2022	1,501	–	21	27	18	7	15	5	−	7	6
Forschungsgruppe Wahlen	22–24 Nov 2022	1,273	26	19	28	22	5	14	6	−	6	6
Kantar	15–22 Nov 2022	1,430	–	19	29	19	7	13	4	−	9	10
INSA	18–21 Nov 2022	2,004	–	20	28	17	7.5	15	5	−	7.5	8
Forsa	15–21 Nov 2022	2,502	25	19	28	20	6	13	5	−	9	8
INSA	14–18 Nov 2022	1,314	–	20	28	17	7	15	5	−	8	8
Allensbach	5–17 Nov 2022	1,042	–	20	29.5	20	7	14	4	−	5.5	9.5
Kantar	9–15 Nov 2022	1,443	–	20	27	19	7	13	5	−	9	7
INSA	11–14 Nov 2022	2,010	–	20.5	27.5	17.5	7	15	4.5	−	8	7
Forsa	8–14 Nov 2022	2,503	25	19	28	20	6	14	4	−	9	8
INSA	8–11 Nov 2022	1,255	–	21	28	18	7	15	4	−	7	7
Forschungsgruppe Wahlen	8–10 Nov 2022	1,310	23	19	28	22	5	15	5	−	6	6
Infratest dimap	8–9 Nov 2022	1,225	–	18	28	19	7	14	4	−	10	9
YouGov	4–9 Nov 2022	1,608	–	18	29	20	5	16	7	1	5	9
Wahlkreisprognose	7–8 Nov 2022	1,300	–	24.5	25.5	16	8.5	14	3.5	−	8	1
Kantar	2–8 Nov 2022	1,442	–	21	26	20	7	14	5	−	7	5
Ipsos	4–7 Nov 2022	1,000	–	19	27	20	7	13	6	−	8	7
INSA	4–7 Nov 2022	2,007	–	21	27	17.5	8	14.5	4.5	−	7.5	6
Forsa	1–7 Nov 2022	2,502	24	19	28	19	6	14	5	−	9	9
INSA	1–4 Nov 2022	1,286	–	21	27	17	8	15	5	−	7	6
Infratest dimap	31 Oct – 2 Nov 2022	1,307	–	19	28	19	6	14	5	−	9	9
Kantar	25 Oct – 2 Nov 2022	1,516	–	21	26	19	8	14	5	−	7	5
INSA	28–31 Oct 2022	2,009	–	20.5	26	18	9	15	4.5	−	7	5.5
Forsa	25–31 Oct 2022	2,503	23	20	27	20	6	14	4	−	9	7
INSA	24–28 Oct 2022	1,230	–	20	26	18	9	15	5	−	7	6
Kantar	19–25 Oct 2022	1,406	–	21	25	20	7	15	5	−	7	4
GMS	19–25 Oct 2022	1,002	–	18	28	20	6	15	4	−	9	8
INSA	21–24 Oct 2022	2,007	–	20.5	26.5	17.5	8.5	15	4.5	−	7.5	6
Forsa	18–24 Oct 2022	2,502	22	19	28	20	6	14	4	−	9	8
Wahlkreisprognose	18–21 Oct 2022	1,910	–	22	25	17.5	8	16	3.5	−	8	3
INSA	17–21 Oct 2022	1,503	–	20	27	18	8	15	5	−	7	7
Forschungsgruppe Wahlen	18–20 Oct 2022	1,389	22	19	28	21	6	15	5	−	6	7
Kantar	12–18 Oct 2022	1,435	–	22	23	20	7	16	4	−	8	1
INSA	14–17 Oct 2022	2,000	–	19.5	27.5	18.5	7.5	15.5	4.5	−	7	8
Forsa	11–17 Oct 2022	2,505	–	20	27	20	6	14	4	−	9	7
INSA	10–14 Oct 2022	1,327	–	19	28	18	8	15	5	−	7	9
Allensbach	1–13 Oct 2022	1,021	–	19	30.5	19	7	14	5	−	5.5	11.5
Infratest dimap	11–12 Oct 2022	1,225	–	19	26	20	6	15	5	−	9	6
YouGov	7–12 Oct 2022	1,617	–	16	29	19	6	15	6	2	7	10
Kantar	5–11 Oct 2022	1,433	–	20	25	21	6	15	5	−	8	4
Forsa	4–10 Oct 2022	2,501	24	18	28	20	6	14	5	−	9	8
INSA	4–10 Oct 2022	2,005	–	19.5	27.5	19	7.5	15	5	−	6.5	8
Ipsos	7–9 Oct 2022	1,000	–	18	27	21	7	13	6	−	8	6
INSA	4–7 Oct 2022	1,315	–	19	27	19	8	15	5	−	7	8
Wahlkreisprognose	3–6 Oct 2022	1,923	–	21	25	16	9	16	4.5	−	8.5	4
Infratest dimap	3–5 Oct 2022	1,307	–	17	28	19	7	15	5	−	9	9
Kantar	28 Sep – 4 Oct 2022	1,864	–	18	27	20	8	14	6	−	7	7
INSA	30 Sep – 3 Oct 2022	2,008	–	19	27.5	18.5	8	15	5.5	−	6.5	8.5
Forsa	27–30 Sep 2022	2,001	25	18	28	20	6	14	5	−	9	8
INSA	26–30 Sep 2022	1,210	–	19	28	18	8	15	6	−	6	9
Forschungsgruppe Wahlen	27–29 Sep 2022	1,355	27	18	27	22	7	14	5	−	7	5
Kantar	22–27 Sep 2022	1,381	–	19	27	21	8	13	5	−	7	6
INSA	23–26 Sep 2022	2,102	–	18	27.5	19.5	8	15	5.5	−	6.5	8
Forsa	20–26 Sep 2022	2,505	23	18	28	20	7	13	5	−	9	8
INSA	19–23 Sep 2022	1,255	–	19	28	19	8	14	5	−	7	9
Wahlkreisprognose	20–22 Sep 2022	1,700	–	22	26	18	8	13.5	4	−	8.5	4
Kantar	14–20 Sep 2022	1,444	–	19	27	20	7	14	5	−	8	7
GMS	14–20 Sep 2022	1,003	–	18	28	21	7	13	4	−	9	7
INSA	16–19 Sep 2022	2,080	–	18.5	28.5	19	7.5	14	5.5	−	7	9.5
Forsa	13–19 Sep 2022	2,506	23	19	28	19	7	13	5	−	9	9
INSA	12–16 Sep 2022	1,476	–	19	28	19	7	13	6	−	8	9
Infratest dimap	13–14 Sep 2022	1,224	–	17	28	21	7	14	5	−	8	7
Allensbach	1–14 Sep 2022	1,030	–	20	30	19	7	13	5.5	−	5.5	10
YouGov	9–13 Sep 2022	1,635	–	16	29	19	6	14	7	1	7	10
Kantar	7–13 Sep 2022	1,443	–	20	26	21	7	13	5	−	8	5
Forsa	6–13 Sep 2022	2,501	–	19	28	20	6	13	5	−	9	8
INSA	9–12 Sep 2022	2,039	–	18	28	20	8	13.5	5.5	−	7	8
Wahlkreisprognose	9–11 Sep 2022	1,300	–	20	25.5	19	7	14	5.5	−	9	5.5
INSA	5–9 Sep 2022	1,443	–	19	27	20	8	13	5	−	8	7
Forschungsgruppe Wahlen	6–8 Sep 2022	1,299	25	19	28	23	6	13	5	−	6	5
Kantar	31 Aug – 6 Sep 2022	1,416	–	20	25	21	8	12	5	−	9	4
INSA	2–5 Sep 2022	2,004	–	18	28	20.5	7.5	13.5	5.5	−	7	7.5
Forsa	30 Aug – 5 Sep 2022	2,500	25	18	26	24	7	11	5	−	9	2
Ipsos	2–4 Sep 2022	1,000	–	19	26	21	8	12	6	−	8	5
INSA	29 Aug – 2 Sep 2022	1,203	–	19	28	20	8	13	5	−	7	8
Infratest dimap	29–31 Aug 2022	1,324	–	17	27	22	8	13	5	−	8	5
Kantar	24–30 Aug 2022	1,411	–	21	24	22	8	12	5	−	8	2
INSA	26–29 Aug 2022	2,138	–	19	27.5	20.5	8	13	5.5	−	6.5	7
Forsa	23–29 Aug 2022	2,503	25	17	26	25	7	11	5	−	9	1
INSA	22–26 Aug 2022	1,204	–	20	28	21	8	12	5	−	6	7
Civey	18–25 Aug 2022	10,014	–	19	27	22	7	11	5	−	9	5
Kantar	17–23 Aug 2022	1,431	–	19	26	23	7	12	5	−	8	3
INSA	19–22 Aug 2022	2,091	–	18.5	28	21	7.5	13	5.5	−	6.5	7
Forsa	16–22 Aug 2022	2,505	25	18	26	25	7	11	4	−	9	1
INSA	15–19 Aug 2022	1,427	–	19	28	21	8	12	5	−	7	7
Wahlkreisprognose	16–18 Aug 2022	1,433	–	18	25	26	6	14	3	−	8	1
Allensbach	5–18 Aug 2022	1,038	–	19.5	29	21	8	12	5	−	5.5	8
Infratest dimap	16–17 Aug 2022	1,273	–	18	28	23	7	12	4	−	8	5
Kantar	10–16 Aug 2022	1,429	–	20	28	23	6	12	4	−	7	5
INSA	12–15 Aug 2022	2,146	–	19	28	22	8	12	5	−	6	6
Forsa	9–15 Aug 2022	2,500	28	18	26	25	6	11	4	−	10	1
INSA	8–12 Aug 2022	1,502	–	19	27	22	9	12	5	−	6	5
Wahlkreisprognose	6–12 Aug 2022	2,920	–	16	24	25.5	8	14.5	3.5	−	8.5	1.5
Forschungsgruppe Wahlen	9–11 Aug 2022	1,389	25	19	26	26	7	12	4	−	6	Tie
YouGov	5–10 Aug 2022	1,595	–	19	27	21	6	14	6	1	7	6
Kantar	3–9 Aug 2022	1,422	–	21	27	22	7	11	5	−	7	5
Ipsos	5–8 Aug 2022	1,000	–	19	27	22	8	11	5	−	8	5
INSA	5–8 Aug 2022	2,099	–	18	27	21.5	8	12.5	5.5	−	7.5	5.5
Forsa	2–8 Aug 2022	2,504	26	18	26	24	7	10	5	−	10	2
INSA	1–5 Aug 2022	1,701	–	19	27	21	9	12	5	−	7	6
Infratest dimap	1–3 Aug 2022	1,313	–	17	28	23	7	13	4	−	8	5
Kantar	26 Jul – 2 Aug 2022	1,426	–	21	25	23	6	11	5	−	9	2
INSA	29 Jul – 1 Aug 2022	2,144	–	18.5	26.5	22	8	12	5	−	8	4.5
Forsa	26 Jul – 1 Aug 2022	2,504	–	18	27	24	7	10	5	−	9	3
INSA	25–29 Jul 2022	1,202	–	19	26	22	9	12	5	−	7	4
Kantar	19–26 Jul 2022	1,413	–	21	26	22	7	11	5	−	8	4
INSA	22–25 Jul 2022	2,043	–	18.5	26.5	22	8	12	5	−	8	4.5
GMS	20–25 Jul 2022	1,005	–	18	27	23	9	10	5	−	8	4
Forsa	19–25 Jul 2022	2,510	22	19	26	24	6	10	5	−	10	2
INSA	18–22 Jul 2022	1,501	–	18	27	23	8	12	5	−	7	4
Allensbach	8–21 Jul 2022	1,006	–	22	27.5	22	7	11	5	−	5.5	5.5
Infratest dimap	19–20 Jul 2022	1,210	–	19	27	22	7	12	4	−	9	5
Wahlkreisprognose	19–20 Jul 2022	1,400	−	22	24	24	8.5	10.5	3.5	−	7.5	Tie
Kantar	13–19 Jul 2022	1,392	–	19	25	23	8	11	5	−	9	2
INSA	15–18 Jul 2022	2,062	–	18.5	26.5	22	8	12	4.5	−	8.5	4.5
Forsa	12–18 Jul 2022	2,501	–	20	26	24	6	9	5	−	10	2
Civey	11–18 Jul 2022	10,018	–	20	27	23	7	10	5	−	8	4
INSA	11–15 Jul 2022	1,277	–	19	26	22	8	11	5	−	9	4
Forschungsgruppe Wahlen	12–14 Jul 2022	1,167	25	21	26	25	6	11	5	−	6	1
Kantar	6–12 Jul 2022	1,433	–	20	25	24	8	11	4	−	8	1
INSA	8–11 Jul 2022	2,044	–	20	27	21	8.5	11	4.5	−	8	6
Forsa	5–11 Jul 2022	2,503	22	19	26	24	7	9	5	−	10	2
INSA	4–8 Jul 2022	1,202	–	19	28	22	8	10	4	−	9	6
Wahlkreisprognose	5–6 Jul 2022	1,700	−	22	25	22	8	10	4	−	9	3
Infratest dimap	4–6 Jul 2022	1,327	–	19	27	23	8	11	4	−	8	4
YouGov	1–5 Jul 2022	1,655	–	19	28	20	7	12	5	1	8	8
Kantar	28 Jun – 5 Jul 2022	1,426	–	20	25	24	7	10	5	−	9	1
INSA	1–4 Jul 2022	2,066	–	19	28	21	9.5	11	4	−	7.5	7
Forsa	28 Jun – 4 Jul 2022	2,502	23	20	26	24	8	9	4	−	9	2
Ipsos	1–2 Jul 2022	1,000	–	22	26	20	9	10	5	−	8	4
INSA	27 Jun – 2 Jul 2022	1,253	–	20	27	22	9	11	4	−	7	5
Forschungsgruppe Wahlen	28–30 Jun 2022	1,186	20	21	27	25	6	10	5	−	6	2
Kantar	21–28 Jun 2022	1,410	–	20	26	25	8	10	4	−	7	1
INSA	24–27 Jun 2022	2,101	–	20	27	21.5	9	10.5	4	−	8	5.5
Forsa	21–27 Jun 2022	2,500	22	20	26	24	8	9	4	−	9	2
Wahlkreisprognose	23–26 Jun 2022	2,430	−	22	25	21	7	12	4	−	9	3
INSA	20–24 Jun 2022	1,414	–	20	26	22	9	11	4	−	8	4
Infratest dimap	21–22 Jun 2022	1,248	–	20	26	23	8	12	4	−	7	3
Kantar	14–21 Jun 2022	1,769	–	20	26	24	8	10	4	−	8	2
INSA	17–20 Jun 2022	2,063	–	19.5	28	21	9.5	10	4	−	8	7
GMS	15–20 Jun 2022	1,003	–	21	29	21	8	8	4	−	9	8
Forsa	14–20 Jun 2022	2,504	25	19	28	23	8	9	4	−	9	5
INSA	13–17 Jun 2022	1,501	–	20	27	21	9	10	4	−	9	6
Allensbach	3–17 Jun 2022	1,046	–	23	27	22	8	10	4.5	−	5.5	4
Forschungsgruppe Wahlen	13–15 Jun 2022	1,133	22	22	26	25	6	10	5	−	6	1
Kantar	8–14 Jun 2022	1,895	–	20	28	22	8	9	4	−	9	6
INSA	10–13 Jun 2022	2,082	–	20	27.5	21	9.5	10.5	3.5	−	8	6.5
Forsa	7–13 Jun 2022	2,511	20	20	27	23	8	9	4	−	9	4
INSA	7–10 Jun 2022	1,203	–	21	27	21	9	10	4	−	8	6
Wahlkreisprognose	7–8 Jun 2022	1,603	−	22	24	20	7	13	6	−	8	2
Ipsos	3–7 Jun 2022	1,000	–	23	27	19	9	10	4	−	8	4
YouGov	3–7 Jun 2022	1,633	–	18	30	21	7	12	6	1	6	9
INSA	3–7 Jun 2022	2,055	–	20	27	21.5	9.5	10.5	3.5	−	8	5.5
Kantar	1–7 Jun 2022	1,428	–	22	26	23	9	8	4	−	8	3
Forsa	31 May – 3 Jun 2022	2,002	20	19	27	23	8	10	4	−	9	4
INSA	30 May – 3 Jun 2022	1,501	–	22	27	20	9	9	4	−	9	5
Infratest dimap	30 May – 1 Jun 2022	1,226	–	21	27	21	8	11	4	−	8	6
Wahlkreisprognose	30 May – 1 Jun 2022	1,500	−	18	27	25.5	8	9	4	−	8.5	1.5
Kantar	24–31 May 2022	1,428	–	20	28	23	8	8	4	−	9	5
INSA	27–30 May 2022	2,056	–	22	27	20.5	8.5	10	3.5	−	8.5	5
GMS	25–30 May 2022	1,005	–	22	30	20	8	7	4	−	9	8
Forsa	24–30 May 2022	2,004	21	19	29	24	7	9	4	−	8	5
INSA	23–27 May 2022	1,337	–	23	27	19	9	9	4	−	9	4
Kantar	17–24 May 2022	1,422	–	21	27	21	8	9	5	−	9	6
INSA	20–23 May 2022	2,100	–	22	28.5	20	8.5	10.5	3	−	7.5	6.5
Forsa	17–23 May 2022	2,505	22	21	28	23	7	9	4	−	8	5
Civey	16–23 May 2022	10,050	–	22	27	20	8	11	5	−	7	5
INSA	16–20 May 2022	1,214	–	21	28	19	10	10	3	−	9	7
Forschungsgruppe Wahlen	17–19 May 2022	1,162	22	22	26	24	7	10	4	−	7	2
Allensbach	6–18 May 2022	1,118	–	24	29	20.5	8	9	4.5	−	5	5
Kantar	11–17 May 2022	1,425	–	22	26	21	8	10	5	−	8	4
Wahlkreisprognose	15–16 May 2022	1,302	−	23.5	29	23	5.5	7.5	2.5	−	9	5.5
INSA	13–16 May 2022	2,147	–	21.5	28	20.5	9	11	3	−	7	6.5
Forsa	10–16 May 2022	2,502	23	22	27	22	8	8	4	−	9	5
INSA	9–13 May 2022	1,501	–	22	27	18	10	10	4	−	9	5
Infratest dimap	10–11 May 2022	1,226	–	22	26	20	8	11	4	−	9	4
YouGov	6–10 May 2022	1,659	–	20	28	19	9	10	5	1	7	8
Kantar	4–10 May 2022	1,426	–	22	26	20	9	10	5	−	8	4
Wahlkreisprognose	8–9 May 2022	1,610	−	24	23.5	22.5	10.5	9	3	−	7.5	0.5
INSA	6–9 May 2022	2,086	–	22.5	27.5	19	10	10.5	3.5	−	7	5
Forsa	3–9 May 2022	2,501	–	23	26	21	9	9	4	−	8	3
Ipsos	6 May 2022	906	–	24	25	16	11	11	5	−	8	1
INSA	2–6 May 2022	1,501	–	23	27	18	11	10	3	−	8	4
pollytix	29 Apr – 4 May 2022	1,303	–	22	26	17	12	12	5	−	6	4
Kantar	26 Apr – 3 May 2022	1,570	–	23	27	19	9	9	5	−	8	4
INSA	29 Apr – 2 May 2022	2,146	–	23	27	19	9.5	10.5	4.5	−	6.5	4
Forsa	26 Apr – 2 May 2022	2,508	–	23	26	20	9	9	4	−	9	3
INSA	25–29 Apr 2022	1,202	–	23	26	18	10	11	4	−	8	3
Forschungsgruppe Wahlen	26–28 Apr 2022	1,170	21	25	23	21	9	11	4	−	7	2
Infratest dimap	25–27 Apr 2022	1,314	–	24	26	18	9	11	3	−	9	2
Kantar	19–26 Apr 2022	1,431	–	23	25	20	9	9	5	−	9	2
INSA	22–25 Apr 2022	2,056	–	24	26.5	18	9	11.5	4.5	−	6.5	2.5
GMS	20–25 Apr 2022	1,003	–	26	26	18	8	9	4	−	9	Tie
Forsa	19–25 Apr 2022	2,507	25	24	25	20	9	9	4	−	9	1
Civey	8–25 Apr 2022	10,011	–	24	25	20	9	11	4	−	7	1
Wahlkreisprognose	23 Apr 2022	1,007	−	24.5	22.5	22	11	8.5	3	−	8.5	2
INSA	19–22 Apr 2022	1,296	–	24	26	18	9	11	5	−	7	2
Kantar	12–19 Apr 2022	1,715	–	25	25	19	9	9	4	−	9	Tie
INSA	15–18 Apr 2022	2,073	–	23.5	26	19	9	11	4.5	−	7	2.5
Forsa	12–14 Apr 2022	1,501	25	25	25	20	8	9	4	−	9	Tie
INSA	11–14 Apr 2022	1,402	–	25	26	17	10	10	5	−	7	1
Infratest dimap	11–12 Apr 2022	1,226	–	24	26	18	8	11	4	−	9	2
YouGov	8–12 Apr 2022	1,643	–	21	26	18	9	12	6	1	7	5
Kantar	6–12 Apr 2022	1,960	–	26	25	19	8	10	4	−	8	1
INSA	8–11 Apr 2022	2,061	–	25	27	17.5	9	11	4.5	−	6	2
Forsa	5–11 Apr 2022	2,500	25	27	24	19	8	9	4	−	9	3
INSA	4–8 Apr 2022	1,503	–	25	26	16	10	11	4	−	8	1
Forschungsgruppe Wahlen	5–7 Apr 2022	1,230	21	27	24	19	8	11	4	−	7	3
Infratest dimap	4–6 Apr 2022	1,325	–	24	25	19	9	11	4	−	8	1
Allensbach	25 Mar – 6 Apr 2022	1,075	–	28	24	17	9	9	6	−	7	4
Kantar	30 Mar – 5 Apr 2022	1,437	–	27	25	19	8	10	4	−	7	2
Wahlkreisprognose	3–4 Apr 2022	2,450	−	27	25.5	19	8.5	9	3	−	8	1.5
INSA	1–4 Apr 2022	2,063	–	25	26	17.5	10.5	10.5	4.5	−	6	1
Ipsos	1 Apr 2022	912	–	25	23	15	12	12	6	−	7	2
Forsa	29 Mar – 4 Apr 2022	2,508	24	27	24	19	8	9	4	−	9	3
INSA	25 Mar – 1 Apr 2022	1,501	–	26	26	16	10	11	4	−	7	Tie
Kantar	23–29 Mar 2022	1,428	–	25	26	18	9	9	5	−	8	1
INSA	25–28 Mar 2022	2,070	–	25	26	16.5	10	10.5	5.5	−	6.5	1
Forsa	22–28 Mar 2022	2,507	22	24	26	18	9	9	5	−	9	2
INSA	21–25 Mar 2022	1,205	–	26	26	16	10	11	5	−	6	Tie
Kantar	16–22 Mar 2022	1,429	–	26	25	18	9	9	6	−	7	1
INSA	18–21 Mar 2022	2,122	–	24.5	26.5	16.5	11	11	4.5	−	6	2
Forsa	15–21 Mar 2022	2,501	22	23	27	18	10	9	5	−	8	4
Allensbach	9–21 Mar 2022	1,041	–	25	25	17	10.5	10	5	−	7.5	Tie
Wahlkreisprognose	18–20 Mar 2022	1,923	−	26.5	25.5	18.5	10	8.5	3	−	8	1
INSA	14–18 Mar 2022	1,198	–	26	26	16	10	10	5	−	7	Tie
Infratest dimap	15–16 Mar 2022	1,254	–	25	26	17	9	11	4	−	8	1
Kantar	9–15 Mar 2022	1,416	–	26	26	19	8	9	5	−	7	Tie
INSA	11–14 Mar 2022	2,073	–	25	25.5	15.5	10.5	10.5	5	−	8	0.5
Forsa	8–14 Mar 2022	2,502	–	25	26	18	9	9	5	−	8	1
INSA	7–11 Mar 2022	1,201	–	26	24	16	10	10	6	−	8	2
Forschungsgruppe Wahlen	8–10 Mar 2022	1,345	19	27	24	18	9	10	5	−	7	3
YouGov	4–8 Mar 2022	1,629	–	23	26	16	9	11	6	1	7	3
Kantar	2–8 Mar 2022	1,426	–	25	26	19	8	10	5	−	7	1
INSA	4–7 Mar 2022	2,103	–	25	24.5	15.5	11	10.5	6	−	7.5	0.5
Ipsos	4 Mar 2022	935	–	25	24	16	11	11	6	−	7	1
Forsa	1–7 Mar 2022	2,501	22	26	25	18	9	7	6	−	9	1
INSA	28 Feb – 4 Mar 2022	1,185	–	25	25	15	11	11	6	−	7	Tie
Infratest dimap	28 Feb – 2 Mar 2022	1,320	–	25	26	16	9	11	5	−	8	1
Kantar	23 Feb – 1 Mar 2022	1,405	–	26	26	17	8	10	6	−	7	Tie
INSA	25–28 Feb 2022	2,067	–	23	27	15.5	11	10.5	6.5	−	6.5	4
Forsa	24–28 Feb 2022	1,500	–	25	26	18	9	7	6	−	9	1
Wahlkreisprognose	24–27 Feb 2022	2,030	−	26	23.5	17.5	11.5	10.5	4	−	7	2.5
GMS	23–26 Feb 2022	1,005	–	24	27	15	10	9	6	−	9	3
INSA	21–25 Feb 2022	1,405	–	23	26	15	11	12	7	−	6	3
Forschungsgruppe Wahlen	21–23 Feb 2022	1,103	20	26	24	17	9	11	6	−	7	2
Kantar	16–22 Feb 2022	1,432	–	26	25	17	9	10	7	−	6	1
INSA	18–21 Feb 2022	1,539	–	23	27	14.5	12.5	11	6	−	6	4
Forsa	15–21 Feb 2022	2,500	23	23	27	17	9	9	6	−	9	4
INSA	14–18 Feb 2022	1,303	–	22	27	15	11	12	7	−	6	5
Infratest dimap	15–16 Feb 2022	1,202	–	24	26	15	9	12	5	−	9	2
Allensbach	3–16 Feb 2022	1,033	–	23	27	15	10.5	10	6	−	6.5	4
Wahlkreisprognose	13–15 Feb 2022	1,200	−	25	24.5	17	9.5	9.5	6	−	8.5	0.5
YouGov	10–15 Feb 2022	1,659	–	21	27	17	9	11	7	1	6	6
Kantar	8–15 Feb 2022	1,434	–	24	24	16	10	12	6	−	8	Tie
INSA	11–14 Feb 2022	2,141	–	22.5	26	15	12	12	6	−	6.5	3.5
Forsa	8–14 Feb 2022	2,504	22	23	27	16	9	9	6	−	10	4
INSA	7–11 Feb 2022	1,504	–	22	26	16	11	12	6	−	7	4
Forschungsgruppe Wahlen	8–10 Feb 2022	1,224	18	25	25	16	9	11	6	−	8	Tie
pollytix	4–8 Feb 2022	1,547	–	23	27	15	9	12	8	−	6	4
Kantar	1–8 Feb 2022	1,287	–	22	26	16	10	12	6	−	8	4
INSA	4–7 Feb 2022	2,067	–	23	26	15	12	11	7	−	6	3
Ipsos	4 Feb 2022	910	–	25	24	16	8	12	8	−	7	1
Forsa	1–7 Feb 2022	2,502	23	22	27	16	9	10	6	−	10	5
INSA	1–4 Feb 2022	1,202	–	22	27	16	11	11	6	−	7	5
Wahlkreisprognose	1–3 Feb 2022	2,330	−	21	28	19	8.5	10	5.5	−	8	7
Civey	22 Jan – 3 Feb 2022	10,070	–	25	25	15	10	11	6	–	8	Tie
Infratest dimap	31 Jan – 2 Feb 2022	1,339	–	22	27	16	10	12	5	–	8	5
Kantar	26 Jan – 1 Feb 2022	1,410	–	24	24	17	9	11	6	−	9	Tie
INSA	28–31 Jan 2022	2,247	–	24	25	15	12.5	10	6.5	–	7	1
Forsa	25–31 Jan 2022	2,501	23	23	27	16	9	10	6	–	9	4
INSA	24–28 Jan 2022	1,383	–	26	24	16	11	11	6	–	6	2
Forschungsgruppe Wahlen	25–27 Jan 2022	1,249	21	24	23	18	10	10	7	–	8	1
YouGov	21–25 Jan 2022	1,602	–	23	26	15	8	12	8	2	7	3
Kantar	19–25 Jan 2022	1,415	–	24	24	18	10	10	6	–	8	Tie
INSA	21–24 Jan 2022	2,146	–	26	24	15	11.5	11	6	–	6.5	2
Forsa	18–24 Jan 2022	2,502	22	25	24	16	10	10	6	–	9	1
INSA	17–21 Jan 2022	1,204	–	26	23	16	12	12	6	–	5	3
Allensbach	6–20 Jan 2022	1,090	–	27.5	23	14.5	12.5	10	5.5	–	7	4.5
Infratest dimap	18–19 Jan 2022	1,424	–	25	24	16	10	12	5	–	8	1
Wahlkreisprognose	15–18 Jan 2022	1,920	−	27.5	22.5	17	10.5	10	4.5	–	8	5
Kantar	12–18 Jan 2022	1,441	–	26	22	17	9	12	6	–	8	4
INSA	14–17 Jan 2022	2,130	–	26	22.5	15.5	12	12	6	–	6	3.5
Forsa	11–17 Jan 2022	2,504	22	25	25	16	10	10	5	–	9	Tie
INSA	10–14 Jan 2022	1,504	–	27	23	16	11	12	5	–	6	4
Forschungsgruppe Wahlen	11–13 Jan 2022	1,128	21	27	22	16	11	10	6	–	8	5
Kantar	5–11 Jan 2022	1,426	–	26	23	17	10	10	6	–	8	3
INSA	7–10 Jan 2022	2,107	–	26.5	23	15	12	12	5	–	6.5	3.5
Forsa	3–10 Jan 2022	3,003	22	25	25	17	10	9	5	–	9	Tie
Ipsos	6–9 Jan 2022	929	–	25	21	15	11	12	6	–	10	4
INSA	3–7 Jan 2022	1,504	–	27	23	16	12	11	5	–	6	4
Infratest dimap	3–5 Jan 2022	1,325	–	26	23	16	11	11	5	–	8	3
INSA	30 Dec – 3 Jan 2022	2,060	–	26.5	23	15.5	11	11.5	6	–	6.5	3.5
GMS	29 Dec – 3 Jan 2022	1,003	–	26	24	16	12	11	4	–	7	2
2021 federal election	26 Sep 2021	–	23.4	25.7	24.2	14.7	11.4	10.4	4.9	2.4	6.3	1.5

=== 2021 ===
Polling firm	Fieldwork date	Sample size	Abs.	SPD	Union	Grüne	FDP	AfD	Linke	FW	Others	Lead
INSA	27–30 Dec 2021	1,201	–	27	24	16	10	11	5	–	7	3
INSA	20–23 Dec 2021	1,195	–	28	23	15	11	11	5	–	7	5
INSA	17–20 Dec 2021	2,075	–	27.5	21.5	14.5	13	11.5	5.5	–	6.5	6
Forsa	14–20 Dec 2021	2,501	–	26	24	16	10	9	5	–	10	2
Wahlkreisprognose	18–19 Dec 2021	1,120	−	30	21.5	14.5	11.5	10	4	–	8.5	8.5
INSA	13–18 Dec 2021	1,501	–	27	23	14	12	12	5	–	7	4
Kantar	14–16 Dec 2021	1,436	–	27	22	16	11	11	5	–	8	5
Allensbach	1–15 Dec 2021	1,069	–	26	24	15	13	10.5	5	–	6.5	2
YouGov	10–14 Dec 2021	1,715	–	27	23	16	10	11	6	2	6	4
Kantar	8–14 Dec 2021	1,440	–	27	22	16	11	10	5	–	9	5
INSA	10–13 Dec 2021	2,221	–	27	22	14.5	13	11.5	5.5	–	6.5	5
Forsa	7–13 Dec 2021	2,509	–	26	23	15	11	10	5	–	10	3
INSA	6–10 Dec 2021	1,480	–	26	22	15	13	11	5	–	8	4
Forschungsgruppe Wahlen	7–9 Dec 2021	1,303	21	28	21	17	12	10	5	–	7	7
Infratest dimap	7–8 Dec 2021	1,266	–	26	23	16	12	11	5	–	7	3
Civey	1–8 Dec 2021	10,043	–	27	23	15	11	11	5	–	8	4
Kantar	1–7 Dec 2021	1,439	–	28	21	15	11	11	5	3	6	7
INSA	3–6 Dec 2021	2,119	–	26	22	15	13.5	11.5	5.5	–	6.5	4
Wahlkreisprognose	1–6 Dec 2021	1,002	−	29	18	16.5	13.5	11	4	–	8	11
Forsa	30 Nov – 6 Dec 2021	2,503	–	25	22	17	11	10	5	–	10	3
INSA	29 Nov – 3 Dec 2021	1,348	–	26	21	15	13	12	5	–	8	5
Infratest dimap	29 Nov – 1 Dec 2021	1,316	–	25	23	17	12	11	5	–	7	2
Civey	24 Nov – 1 Dec 2021	10,078	–	26	24	15	11	11	5	–	8	2
Kantar	24–30 Nov 2021	1,425	–	27	20	16	12	11	6	–	8	7
INSA	26–29 Nov 2021	2,129	–	25	21	16	14	11	5.5	–	7.5	4
Forsa	23–29 Nov 2021	2,509	–	24	22	17	12	10	5	–	10	2
INSA	22–26 Nov 2021	1,403	–	26	21	15	13	12	6	–	7	5
Forschungsgruppe Wahlen	23–25 Nov 2021	1,344	19	28	19	17	13	11	5	–	7	9
Infratest dimap	23–24 Nov 2021	1,239	–	25	21	17	13	11	5	–	8	4
Wahlkreisprognose	22–24 Nov 2021	1,002	–	27	22.5	15.5	11.5	10	5	–	8.5	4.5
Civey	17–24 Nov 2021	10,064	–	25	24	15	11	11	5	–	9	1
YouGov	19–23 Nov 2021	1,797	–	25	23	16	11	12	6	2	5	2
Kantar	17–23 Nov 2021	1,424	–	24	22	18	11	11	6	–	8	2
INSA	19–22 Nov 2021	2,096	–	26	22	14	14	11	5.5	–	7.5	4
Forsa	16–22 Nov 2021	2,501	21	24	22	17	12	10	5	–	10	2
INSA	15–19 Nov 2021	1,501	–	26	21	15	13	12	5	–	8	5
Civey	10–17 Nov 2021	10,077	–	26	23	15	12	11	5	–	8	3
Kantar	10–16 Nov 2021	1,433	–	24	21	18	12	11	6	–	8	3
INSA	12–15 Nov 2021	2,091	–	27	21	15	13	11.5	5.5	–	7	6
Forsa	9–15 Nov 2021	2,510	21	24	22	17	12	10	5	–	10	2
INSA	8–12 Nov 2021	1,202	–	26	22	15	13	11	5	–	8	4
Forschungsgruppe Wahlen	9–11 Nov 2021	1,257	16	28	20	16	13	11	5	–	7	8
Allensbach	29 Oct – 11 Nov 2021	1,016	–	27	23	15	14	9.5	5.5	–	6	4
Civey	3–10 Nov 2021	9,999	–	26	22	15	13	11	5	–	8	4
Kantar	3–9 Nov 2021	1,424	–	25	21	16	14	10	6	–	8	4
INSA	5–8 Nov 2021	2,112	–	26.5	20.5	16	13.5	10.5	5.5	–	7.7	6
Forsa	2–8 Nov 2021	2,502	–	25	22	16	14	9	5	–	9	3
INSA	1–5 Nov 2021	1,212	–	27	21	15	14	11	5	–	7	6
Wahlkreisprognose	31 Oct – 5 Nov 2021	1,200	–	28	20.5	15.5	14	10.5	4	–	7.5	7.5
GMS	1–4 Nov 2021	1,005	–	26	21	16	15	10	4	–	8	5
Infratest dimap	2–3 Nov 2021	1,329	–	27	21	16	13	10	5	–	8	6
Civey	27 Oct – 3 Nov 2021	10,069	–	26	22	15	13	11	5	–	8	4
Kantar	27 Oct – 2 Nov 2021	1,417	–	25	22	16	13	10	5	3	6	3
INSA	29 Oct – 1 Nov 2021	2,140	–	27	20	16	13.5	11.5	5	–	7	7
Forsa	26 Oct – 1 Nov 2021	2,501	–	25	21	16	15	9	5	–	9	4
INSA	25–29 Oct 2021	1,503	–	27	21	16	13	11	5	–	7	6
Forschungsgruppe Wahlen	26–28 Oct 2021	1,208	15	27	20	16	14	11	5	–	7	7
Infratest dimap	26–27 Oct 2021	1,239	–	26	22	16	13	10	4	–	9	4
Civey	20–27 Oct 2021	10,050	–	25	21	15	14	12	5	–	8	4
Kantar	19–26 Oct 2021	1,422	–	25	21	17	14	11	5	–	7	4
INSA	22–25 Oct 2021	2,105	–	28	20	16	14	11	5	–	6	8
Forsa	19–25 Oct 2021	2,510	–	25	20	17	16	9	5	–	8	5
INSA	18–22 Oct 2021	1,205	–	27	20	17	14	11	4	–	7	7
Civey	13–20 Oct 2021	10,028	–	25	20	15	15	11	6	–	8	5
Kantar	13–19 Oct 2021	1,424	–	25	21	16	13	11	5	–	9	4
INSA	15–18 Oct 2021	2,140	–	28	18.5	16	15	11.5	5	–	6	9.5
Forsa	12–18 Oct 2021	2,502	–	26	20	16	15	9	5	–	9	6
INSA	11–15 Oct 2021	1,195	–	28	19	16	13	11	4	–	9	9
Forschungsgruppe Wahlen	12–14 Oct 2021	1,329	14	28	19	17	13	11	5	–	7	9
Allensbach	1–14 Oct 2021	1,045	–	28	21	15	14	9.5	5	–	7.5	7
Civey	6–13 Oct 2021	9,999	–	26	20	14	15	11	6	–	8	6
Kantar	6–12 Oct 2021	1,410	–	26	19	17	14	10	5	–	9	7
INSA	8–11 Oct 2021	2,101	–	28.5	19.5	16	14.5	11	4	–	6.5	9
Wahlkreisprognose	7–10 Oct 2021	1,210	–	27	19	17.5	14	10	4	–	8.5	8
Forsa	5–11 Oct 2021	2,503	–	26	20	16	14	9	5	–	10	6
INSA	4–8 Oct 2021	1,509	–	28	20	15	14	10	5	–	8	8
Civey	29 Sep – 6 Oct 2021	10,009	–	28	19	15	14	11	6	–	7	9
Kantar	28 Sep – 5 Oct 2021	1,985	–	26	20	17	13	10	5	3	6	6
INSA	1–4 Oct 2021	2,000	–	28	21	15.5	13.5	10	4.5	–	7.5	7
Forsa	27 Sep – 4 Oct 2021	3,004	–	26	20	16	14	9	5	–	10	6
INSA	27 Sep – 1 Oct 2021	1,254	–	28	21	16	12	10	5	–	8	7
Forschungsgruppe Wahlen	28–30 Sep 2021	1,249	15	28	20	16	13	10	5	–	8	8
2021 federal election	26 Sep 2021	–	23.4	25.7	24.2	14.7	11.4	10.4	4.9	2.4	6.3	1.5

=== CDU and CSU ===
Polling firm	Fieldwork date	Sample size	SPD	CDU	Grüne	FDP	AfD	CSU	Linke	FW	BSW	Others	Lead
2025 federal election	23 Feb 2025	–	16.4	22.6	11.6	4.3	20.8	6.0	8.8	1.5	4.98	3.1	1.8
INSA	20–21 Feb 2025	2,005	15	23	12.5	4.5	21	6.5	7.5	–	5	5	2
INSA	14–17 Feb 2025	2,010	15	24	13	4.5	22	6	6.5	–	5	4	2
INSA	7–10 Feb 2025	2,006	15.5	23.5	13	4	22	6.5	6	–	5.5	4	1.5
INSA	31 Jan – 3 Feb 2025	2,004	16	24.5	13	4.5	22	5.5	5	–	5.5	4	2.5
INSA	24–27 Jan 2025	2,006	15.5	23.5	12.5	4.5	22	6.5	4.5	–	6	5	1.5
INSA	17–20 Jan 2025	2,008	16	23.5	13	5	21.5	5.5	4	–	7	4.5	2
INSA	10–13 Jan 2025	2,005	15	24.5	13	4	22	6.5	3.5	–	6.5	5	2.5
INSA	3–6 Jan 2025	2,001	15.5	24.5	13.5	4	21.5	6.5	3	–	6.5	5	3
INSA	27–30 Dec 2024	2,004	16.5	24.5	12	3.5	20.5	6.5	4	–	7	5.5	4
INSA	20–23 Dec 2024	2,010	16	23.5	12.5	5	19.5	7.5	3	–	8	5	4
INSA	13–16 Dec 2024	2,002	16.5	24.5	11.5	5	19.5	7	2.5	–	8	5.5	5
INSA	6–9 Dec 2024	2,004	17	25.5	11.5	4.5	19.5	6	3	–	8	5	6
INSA	29 Nov – 2 Dec 2024	2,003	16	25.5	13	4.5	18.5	6	3.5	–	7.5	5.5	7
INSA	22–25 Nov 2024	2,003	15	25.5	11	4.5	19.5	7	3.5	–	7.5	6.5	6
INSA	15–18 Nov 2024	2,008	16	24.5	11	4.5	19	7.5	3.5	–	7.5	6.5	5.5
INSA	8–11 Nov 2024	3,009	15.5	25.5	11.5	5	19.5	7	3.5	–	7	5.5	6
INSA	1–4 Nov 2024	2,005	15.5	24	10.5	4.5	18	8	3.5	–	8	8	6
INSA	25–28 Oct 2024	2,008	15	24.5	11	4	19	6.5	2.5	–	9	8.5	5.5
INSA	18–21 Oct 2024	2,006	16,5	23.5	10	4	19	7	2.5	–	9	8.5	4.5
INSA	11–14 Oct 2024	2,002	16	24.5	10	4	18.5	7	3.5	–	9	7.5	6
INSA	4–7 Oct 2024	2,010	16	24	10.5	4	20	7.5	2.5	–	8	7.5	4
INSA	27–30 Sep 2024	2,004	15	24.5	11	4	19	7	2.5	–	9.5	7.5	5.5
INSA	20–23 Sep 2024	2,002	15.5	25.5	9.5	3.5	20	6.5	2.5	–	10	7	5.5
INSA	13–16 Sep 2024	2,008	14	26	10	4.5	19.5	7	2.5	–	10	6.5	6.5
INSA	6–9 Sep 2024	2,010	14	25.5	10	4	19.5	7	2.5	–	10	7.5	6
INSA	30 Aug – 2 Sep 2024	2,002	15	24.5	10.5	4.5	19	7	2.5	–	9.5	7.5	5.5
INSA	23–26 Aug 2024	2,004	15	24.5	11.5	5.5	18.5	7	3	–	9	6	6
INSA	16–19 Aug 2024	2,006	15.5	24	10.5	5	19	6.5	3	–	9.5	7	5
INSA	9–12 Aug 2024	2,008	15	23.5	10.5	5	18	7	3	–	9.5	8.5	5.5
INSA	2–5 Aug 2024	2,002	15	24	10.5	5	17	6.5	3	–	9.5	9.5	7
INSA	26–29 Jul 2024	2,006	15	24.5	10	5	18	5.5	3.5	–	9.5	9	6.5
INSA	19–22 Jul 2024	2,010	15	24.5	10.5	5	17	6.5	3.5	–	9	9	7.5
INSA	12–15 Jul 2024	2,500	15	24.5	11.5	5	18	6.5	3	–	8.5	8	6.5
INSA	5–8 Jul 2024	2,007	15	24	11	5.5	17.5	6.5	3	1.5	8.5	7.5	6.5
INSA	28 Jun – 1 Jul 2024	2,006	15	24	12	5.5	17.5	5.5	2.5	2	8.5	7.5	6.5
INSA	21–24 Jun 2024	2,008	14.5	24.5	11.5	5	17.5	6	3	2	8.5	7.5	7
INSA	14–17 Jun 2024	2,010	15	24.5	11	5	17	6.5	3	2	8	8	7.5
INSA	7–10 Jun 2024	2,008	15.5	23	12	5	16	7	3	2.5	7.5	8.5	7
INSA	31 May – 3 Jun 2024	2,002	16	24	12	5	15.5	6.5	3.5	2.5	7.5	7.5	8
INSA	24–27 May 2024	2,004	15	25	12	5	17	5.5	3	2.5	7	8	8
INSA	17–21 May 2024	2,010	16	23.5	12.5	5	17	6.5	3	3	7	6.5	6.5
INSA	10–13 May 2024	2,087	15.5	24.5	13	5	17	6	3.5	2.5	7	6	7.5
INSA	3–6 May 2024	2,006	15.5	23.5	12	5	18	7	3.5	2.5	7.5	5.5	5.5
Forsa	30 Apr – 6 May 2024	2,000	16	24.5	12	6	15	6.5	3	–	4	13	8.5
INSA	26–29 Apr 2024	2,004	16.5	23.5	12.5	5	18.5	6	3.5	2.5	7	5	5
INSA	19–22 Apr 2024	2,008	15	23.5	12.5	5	18.5	7	4	2.5	7	5	5
INSA	12–15 Apr 2024	2,006	16	23.5	13	6	18.5	6	3	2.5	6.5	5	5
INSA	5–8 Apr 2024	2,084	15	23.5	13	5	18.5	7	3.5	2.5	6.5	5.5	5
INSA	28 Mar – 2 Apr 2024	2,004	15	23.5	12.5	5	19.5	6.5	3.5	2.5	6.5	5.5	4
INSA	22–25 Mar 2024	2,008	15.5	23.5	12.5	5	19.5	6.5	3.5	2.5	6.5	5	4
INSA	15–18 Mar 2024	2,002	16	23.5	12	5	19.5	6	3.5	2.5	6.5	5.5	4
INSA	8–11 Mar 2024	2,079	14.5	25.5	12.5	5.5	18.5	5.5	3.5	2.5	6.5	5.5	7
INSA	1–4 Mar 2024	2,007	14.5	24.5	13	5.5	19.5	6	3	2.5	6.5	5	5
INSA	23–26 Feb 2024	2,006	15.5	24	13	4.5	19	6.5	3	3	7.5	4	5
INSA	16–19 Feb 2024	2,007	14.5	24	12.5	4.5	19.5	6.5	3.5	3	7.5	4.5	4.5
INSA	9–12 Feb 2024	2,083	15	23.5	12.5	3.5	20.5	6.5	3.5	3	7.5	4.5	3
INSA	2–5 Feb 2024	2,004	15	24	12.5	4.5	20.5	6	3.5	3	7.5	3.5	3.5
INSA	26–29 Jan 2024	2,002	14.5	23.5	12.5	5	21	6.5	3.5	2.5	7	4	2.5
INSA	19–22 Jan 2024	2,006	13.5	23.5	12.5	5	21.5	7	3	2.5	–	11.5	2
INSA	12–15 Jan 2024	2,004	14	24	12	5	23	7	4	3	–	8	1
INSA	5–8 Jan 2024	2,008	16	25	12	5	23	7	4	3	–	5	2
INSA	29 Dec – 2 Jan 2024	2,002	15	25	13	5	22.5	7	4	3	–	5.5	2.5
INSA	22–27 Dec 2023	2,000	15	25	12	5	23	7	4	3	–	6	2
INSA	15–18 Dec 2023	2,002	15,5	24.5	12.5	5	23	7	4	2.5	–	6	1.5
INSA	8–11 Dec 2023	2,008	16	23.5	12.5	6	22.5	6.5	4	3	–	6	1
INSA	1–4 Dec 2023	2,006	15.5	23	13	6	22.5	6.5	3.5	3	–	7	0.5
INSA	24–27 Nov 2023	2,007	15.5	24.5	12.5	6	22	6	4	3	–	6.5	2.5
INSA	17–20 Nov 2023	2,008	16.5	25.5	13	5.5	21	4.5	4.5	3	–	6.5	4.5
INSA	10–13 Nov 2023	2,008	16.5	24.5	13.5	5	21.5	6	4.5	3	–	5.5	3
INSA	3–6 Nov 2023	2,006	16.5	23	13.5	5.5	22	6.5	4.5	3	–	5.5	1
INSA	27–30 Oct 2023	2,010	16.5	23.5	13	5.5	21	7	4	3.5	–	6	2.5
INSA	20–23 Oct 2023	2,004	16.5	22	13	5.5	22	6.5	5	3.5	–	6	Tie
INSA	13–16 Oct 2023	2,006	16.5	21.5	13	6	23	6.5	4.5	4	–	5	1.5
INSA	6–9 Oct 2023	2,001	17	20.5	13.5	6	22.5	6.5	5	3	–	6	2
INSA	29 Sep – 2 Oct 2023	2,010	18	21	13.5	7	22	5.5	5	2.5	–	5.5	1
INSA	22–25 Sep 2023	2,003	17.5	20.5	13.5	6.5	21.5	6.5	5	3	–	6	1
INSA	15–18 Sep 2023	2,008	17	21	14.5	6	21	5.5	5	3.5	–	6.5	Tie
INSA	8–11 Sep 2023	2,002	18	19.5	14	7	22	7	4.5	–	–	8	2.5
INSA	1–4 Sep 2023	2,010	17.5	20	13.5	7.5	21.5	6.5	4.5	–	–	9	1.5
INSA	25–28 Aug 2023	2,006	18	20.5	14.5	7	21	6	4.5	–	–	8.5	0.5
INSA	18–21 Aug 2023	2,008	18.5	19.5	14	8	20.5	7	5	–	–	7.5	1
INSA	11–14 Aug 2023	2,002	19.5	19.5	13.5	7	21	6.5	4.5	–	–	8.5	1.5
INSA	4–7 Aug 2023	2,004	19	22	14.5	7.5	20.5	5	4.5	–	–	7	1.5
INSA	28–31 Jul 2023	2,003	18.5	20	14	6.5	21.5	6.5	5	–	–	8	1.5
INSA	21–24 Jul 2023	2,006	18.5	20.5	14	7.5	21.5	6	4.5	–	–	7.5	1
INSA	14–17 Jul 2023	2,004	18	20	14	7	20.5	7	5	–	–	8.5	0.5
INSA	7–10 Jul 2023	2,008	19	21	14	7	20.5	5	5	–	–	8.5	0.5
INSA	30 Jun – 3 Jul 2023	2,897	19	20.5	14.5	6.5	21	5	5	–	–	8.5	0.5
INSA	23–26 Jun 2023	2,004	19.5	20	13.5	6.5	20.5	6.5	4.5	–	–	9	0.5
INSA	16–19 Jun 2023	2,006	20	20.5	13.5	7.5	20	6	4.5	–	–	8	0.5
INSA	9–12 Jun 2023	2,003	20	21	13	8	19.5	6	4.5	–	–	8	1
INSA	2–5 Jun 2023	2,009	19	20.5	13.5	9	19	6	5	–	–	8	1.5
INSA	26–30 May 2023	2,004	20.5	23	13	8.5	18	5	4.5	–	–	7.5	2.5
INSA	19–22 May 2023	2,004	20.5	21	14	8.5	17	6.5	5	–	–	7.5	0.5
INSA	12–15 May 2023	2,010	20	22	14.5	8.5	16.5	6	5	–	–	7.5	2
INSA	5–8 May 2023	2,008	20	22	14	9	16.5	6	4.5	–	–	8	2
INSA	28 Apr – 2 May 2023	2,006	21	21	15	8	16.5	6	4.5	–	–	8	Tie
INSA	21–24 Apr 2023	2,004	20	21	14.5	9	16	6.5	4.5	–	–	8.5	1
INSA	14–17 Apr 2023	2,008	21	20.5	15	8	16	7	4.5	–	–	8	0.5
INSA	6–11 Apr 2023	2,005	20	22	15.5	8	16	5.5	4.5	–	–	8.5	2
INSA	31 Mar – 3 Apr 2023	2,007	20	22	15.5	7.5	16	6	4.5	–	–	8.5	2
INSA	24–27 Mar 2023	2,004	20.5	23	16	8	15.5	5	4	–	–	8	2.5
INSA	17–20 Mar 2023	2,006	21.5	22	15	7.5	16	6	5	–	–	7	0.5
INSA	10–13 Mar 2023	2,002	21.5	22	15.5	7.5	16	6.5	4	–	–	7	0.5
INSA	3–6 Mar 2023	2,007	20	23.5	15.5	7.5	15.5	6	5	–	–	7	3.5
INSA	24–27 Feb 2023	2,010	20.5	23.5	15.5	7.5	15.5	6	4.5	–	–	7	3
INSA	17–20 Feb 2023	2,006	21.5	24	15.5	7	15.5	5	5	–	–	6.5	2.5
INSA	10–13 Feb 2023	2,005	20	21	16	7.5	16	7	5	–	–	7.5	1
INSA	3–6 Feb 2023	2,008	21	20	16	8	15.5	7	5	–	–	7.5	1
INSA	27–30 Jan 2023	2,007	20.5	21	16	7.5	15	7.5	5	–	–	7.5	0.5
INSA	20–23 Jan 2023	2,009	20.5	22	16.5	7.5	15	6	4.5	–	–	8	1.5
INSA	13–16 Jan 2023	2,006	21	21	16.5	7.5	15	7	5	–	–	7	Tie
INSA	6–9 Jan 2023	2,006	20	21	17.5	7.5	15	6	5	–	–	8	1
INSA	29 Dec – 2 Jan 2023	2,010	20	21	17.5	7.5	15	6	4.5	–	–	8.5	1
INSA	16–19 Dec 2022	2,005	21	22	17.5	7.5	14.5	5.5	4.5	–	–	7.5	1
INSA	9–12 Dec 2022	2,007	20	21.5	18	7	15.5	7	4.5	–	–	6.5	1.5
INSA	3–5 Dec 2022	2,008	20.5	22	17	7	14.5	6	5	–	–	8	1.5
INSA	25–28 Nov 2022	2,006	21	21	17.5	7	15	6	5	–	–	7.5	Tie
INSA	18–21 Nov 2022	2,004	20	22	17	7.5	15	6	5	–	–	7.5	2
INSA	11–14 Nov 2022	2,010	20.5	21	17.5	7	15	6.5	4.5	–	–	8	0.5
INSA	4–7 Nov 2022	2,007	21	21	17.5	8	14.5	6	4.5	–	–	7.5	Tie
INSA	28–31 Oct 2022	2,009	20.5	20	18	9	15	6	4.5	–	–	7	0.5
INSA	21–24 Oct 2022	2,007	20.5	20.5	17.5	8.5	15	6	4.5	–	–	7.5	Tie
INSA	14–17 Oct 2022	2,000	19.5	20.5	18.5	7.5	15.5	7	4.5	–	–	7	1
INSA	7–10 Oct 2022	2,005	19.5	20.5	19	7.5	15	7	5	–	–	6.5	1
INSA	30 Sep – 3 Oct 2022	2,008	19	21.5	18.5	8	15	6	5.5	–	–	6.5	2.5
INSA	23–26 Sep 2022	2,102	18	21.5	19.5	8	15	6	5.5	–	–	6.5	2
INSA	16–19 Sep 2022	2,080	18.5	22	19	7.5	14	6.5	5.5	–	–	7	3
INSA	9–12 Sep 2022	2,039	18	22	20	8	13.5	6	5.5	–	–	7	2
INSA	2–5 Sep 2022	2,004	18	22	20.5	7.5	13.5	6	5.5	–	–	7	1.5
INSA	26–29 Aug 2022	2,138	19	22.5	20.5	8	13	5	5.5	–	–	6.5	2
INSA	19–22 Aug 2022	2,091	18.5	22	21	7.5	13	6	5.5	–	–	6.5	1
INSA	12–15 Aug 2022	2,146	19	22	22	8	12	6	5	–	–	6	Tie
INSA	5–8 Aug 2022	2,099	18	21	21.5	8	12.5	6	5.5	–	–	7.5	0.5
INSA	29 Jul – 1 Aug 2022	2,144	18.5	20.5	22	8	12	6	5	–	–	8	1.5
INSA	22–25 Jul 2022	2,043	18.5	21.5	22	8	12	5	5	–	–	8	0.5
INSA	15–18 Jul 2022	2,062	18.5	21.5	22	8	12	5	4.5	–	–	8.5	0.5
INSA	8–11 Jul 2022	2,044	20	21.5	21	8.5	11	5.5	4.5	–	–	8	0.5
INSA	1–4 Jul 2022	2,066	19	23	21	9.5	11	5	4	–	–	7.5	2
INSA	24–27 Jun 2022	2,101	20	22	21.5	9	10.5	5	4	–	–	8	0.5
INSA	17–20 Jun 2022	2,063	19.5	21	21	9.5	10	7	4	–	–	8	Tie
INSA	10–13 Jun 2022	2,082	20	21.5	21	9.5	10.5	6	3.5	–	–	8	0.5
INSA	3–7 Jun 2022	2,055	20	21.5	21.5	9.5	10.5	5.5	3.5	–	–	8	Tie
INSA	27–30 May 2022	2,056	22	20.5	20.5	8.5	10	6.5	3.5	–	–	8.5	1.5
INSA	20–23 May 2022	2,100	22	22	20	8.5	10.5	6.5	3	–	–	7.5	Tie
INSA	13–16 May 2022	2,147	21.5	23	20.5	9	11	5	3	–	–	7	1.5
INSA	6–9 May 2022	2,086	22.5	21	19	10	10.5	6.5	3.5	–	–	7	1.5
INSA	29 Apr – 2 May 2022	2,146	23	21	19	9.5	10.5	6	4.5	–	–	6.5	2
INSA	22–25 Apr 2022	2,056	24	20	18	9	11.5	6.5	4.5	–	–	6.5	4
INSA	15–18 Apr 2022	2,073	23.5	20	19	9	11	6	4.5	–	–	7	3.5
INSA	8–11 Apr 2022	2,061	25	20	17.5	9	11	7	4.5	–	–	6	5
INSA	1–4 Apr 2022	2,063	25	21	17.5	10.5	10.5	5	4.5	–	–	6	4
INSA	25–28 Mar 2022	2,070	25	21	16.5	10	10.5	5	5.5	–	–	6.5	4
INSA	18–21 Mar 2022	2,122	24.5	20.5	16.5	11	11	6	4.5	–	–	6	4
INSA	11–14 Mar 2022	2,073	25	19.5	15.5	10.5	10.5	6	5	–	–	8	5.5
INSA	4–7 Mar 2022	2,103	25	19	15.5	11	10.5	5.5	6	–	–	7.5	6
INSA	18–21 Feb 2022	1,539	23	22	14.5	12.5	11	5	6	–	–	6	1
INSA	11–14 Feb 2022	2,141	22.5	21	15	12	12	5	6	–	–	6.5	1.5
INSA	4–7 Feb 2022	2,067	23	20	15	12	11	6	7	–	–	6	3
INSA	28–31 Jan 2022	2,147	24	20	15	12.5	10	5	6.5	–	–	7	4
INSA	21–24 Jan 2022	2,146	26	19	15	11.5	11	5	6	–	–	6.5	7
INSA	14–17 Jan 2022	2,130	26	17	15.5	12	12	5.5	6	–	–	6.5	9
INSA	7–10 Jan 2022	2,107	26.5	18	15	12	12	5	5	–	–	6.5	8.5
INSA	31 Dec – 3 Jan 2022	2,060	26.5	17	15.5	11	11.5	6	6	–	–	6.5	9.5
INSA	17–20 Dec 2021	2,075	27.5	17	14.5	13	11.5	4.5	5.5	–	–	6.5	10.5
INSA	10–13 Dec 2021	2,221	27	17	14.5	13	11.5	5	5.5	–	–	6.5	10
INSA	3–6 Dec 2021	2,119	26	17	15	13.5	11.5	5	5.5	–	–	6.5	9
INSA	26–29 Nov 2021	2,129	25	17	16	14	11	4	5.5	–	–	7.5	8
INSA	19–22 Nov 2021	2,096	26	18	14	14	11	4	5.5	–	–	7.5	8
INSA	12–15 Nov 2021	2,091	27	16.5	15	13	11.5	4.5	5.5	–	–	7	10.5
INSA	5–8 Nov 2021	2,112	26.5	16.5	16	13.5	10.5	4	5.5	–	–	7.5	10
INSA	22–25 Oct 2021	2,105	28	16	16	14	11	4	5	–	–	6	12
INSA	15–18 Oct 2021	2,140	28	13.5	16	15	11.5	5	5	–	–	6	12
INSA	8–11 Oct 2021	2,101	28.5	14	16	14.5	11	5.5	4	–	–	6.5	12.5
INSA	1–4 Oct 2021	2,000	28	15	15.5	13.5	10	6	4.5	–	–	7.5	12.5
2021 federal election	26 Sep 2021	–	25.7	19.0	14.7	11.4	10.4	5.2	4.9	2.4	–	6.3	6.8

=== Scenario polls ===
==== New party scenarios ====
Bündnis Sahra Wagenknecht (Note: BSW was established as an official political party on 8 January 2024.)

Polling firm	Fieldwork date	Sample size	Abs.	SPD	Union	Grüne	FDP	AfD	Linke	FW	BSW	Others	Don't Know	Lead
Wahlkreisprognose	2–4 Jan 2024	1,500	24	13	28.5	11.5	6	23.5	3	2	6	6.5	–	5
Wahlkreisprognose	25–27 Nov 2023	1,200	25	14.5	28	12.5	5.5	23.5	3	–	6	7	–	4.5
INSA	9–10 Nov 2023	1,004	–	17	24	13	5	17	2	3	14	5	–	7
INSA	26–27 Oct 2023	1,005	–	15	29	12	5	17	4	–	14	2	–	12
Wahlkreisprognose	23–25 Oct 2023	1,300	24	15.5	26.5	12.5	5.5	18	3	–	13	6	–	8.5
INSA	20–23 Oct 2023	2,004	–	15.5	26.5	12.5	5.5	18	4	–	12	6	–	8.5
INSA	28–31 Jul 2023	2,003	–	17	23	14	6	16	3	–	15	6	–	6
YouGov	14–19 Jul 2023	2,317	5	14	25	12	5	19	5	–	2	5	9	6
Wahlkreisprognose	27 Feb – 1 Mar 2023	1,419	25	22	26	14	4	13	2	–	14	5	–	4
Wahlkreisprognose	20–22 Sep 2022	1,700	–	20	24	17	7	11	3	–	10	8	–	4

Boris Palmer list

Polling firm	Fieldwork date	Sample size	Abs.	SPD	Union	Grüne	FDP	AfD	Linke	Liste Palmer	Others	Don't Know	Lead
INSA	28–31 Jul 2023	2,003	–	19	22	15	8	20	5	5	6	–	2

==== Leadership scenarios ====
Boris Pistorius as SPD chancellor candidate

Polling firm	Fieldwork date	Sample size	SPD	Union	Grüne	FDP	AfD	Linke	FW	BSW	Others	Lead
Forsa	19–25 Nov 2024	2,500	21	30	11	4	17	3	–	4	10	9
Wahlkreisprognose	14–20 Nov 2024	2,000	27.5	27.5	10.5	2	17	2	3	5.5	5	Tie
Wahlkreisprognose	25–27 Nov 2023	1,200	24	23	9	4	23	2	–	7	8	1
Wahlkreisprognose	26–27 Jul 2023	1,525	27.5	17	13.5	6	20	3.5	3	–	9.5	7.5

Olaf Scholz as SPD chancellor candidate

Polling firm	Fieldwork date	Sample size	SPD	Union	Grüne	FDP	AfD	Linke	FW	BSW	Others	Lead
Wahlkreisprognose	14–20 Nov 2024	2,000	17.5	31	12	2.5	18	2	2	10	5	13

Friedrich Merz as CDU/CSU chancellor candidate

Polling firm	Fieldwork date	Sample size	SPD	Union	Grüne	FDP	AfD	Linke	FW	BSW	Others	Lead
Wahlkreisprognose	25–27 Nov 2023	1,200	15.5	26.5	10	5	24.5	3	–	6.5	9	2
Wahlkreisprognose	26–27 Jul 2023	1,525	22.5	20	14	6.5	20	4	5	–	8	2.5

Hendrik Wüst as CDU/CSU chancellor candidate

Polling firm	Fieldwork date	Sample size	SPD	Union	Grüne	FDP	AfD	Linke	FW	Others	Lead
Wahlkreisprognose	26–27 Jul 2023	1,525	21.5	23	13.5	5	22	4.5	2	8.5	1.5

Markus Söder as CDU/CSU chancellor candidate

Polling firm	Fieldwork date	Sample size	SPD	Union	Grüne	FDP	AfD	Linke	FW	Others	Lead
Wahlkreisprognose	26–27 Jul 2023	1,525	21	28	15	6.5	19.5	3.5	1	5.5	7

Sahra Wagenknecht as Linke lead candidate

Polling firm	Fieldwork date	Sample size	SPD	Union	Grüne	FDP	AfD	Linke	FW	Others	Lead
Wahlkreisprognose	26–27 Jul 2023	1,525	21	21	15	7	16	12	2	6	Tie

==== Other scenarios ====
National-wide CSU

Polling firm	Fieldwork date	Sample size	SPD	CDU	Grüne	FDP	AfD	CSU	Linke	Others	Lead
INSA	28–31 Jul 2023	2,003	17	20	15	6	20	10	5	8	Tie

CDU/CSU open for cooperation with AfD

Polling firm	Fieldwork date	Sample size	SPD	Union	Grüne	FDP	AfD	Linke	FW	Others	Lead
Wahlkreisprognose	26–27 Jul 2023	1,525	25	16.5	14.5	9	19	3.5	6	6.5	6

== By state ==
=== Baden-Württemberg ===
Polling firm	Fieldwork date	Sample size	CDU	SPD	Grüne	FDP	AfD	Linke	BSW	Others	Lead
2025 federal election	23 Feb 2025	–	31.6	14.2	13.6	5.6	19.8	6.8	4.1	4.3	11.8
Infratest dimap	5–10 Feb 2025	1,160	33	12	18	5	18	5	4	5	15
Infratest dimap	5–10 Dec 2024	1,156	34	15	18	5	16	–	4	8	16
INSA	25 Nov–2 Dec 2024	1,000	33	13	18	6	18	3	7	2	15
2021 federal election	26 Sep 2021	–	24.8	21.6	17.2	15.3	9.6	3.3	–	8.2	3.2

=== Bavaria ===
Polling firm	Fieldwork date	Sample size	CSU	SPD	Grüne	FDP	AfD	Free Voters	Linke	BSW	Others	Lead
2025 federal election	23 Feb 2025	–	37.2	11.6	12.0	4.2	19.0	4.3	5.7	3.1	2.9	18.2
GMS	16–19 Feb 2025	1,026	42	10	11	4	19	5	3	2	4	23
GMS	4–7 Feb 2025	1,017	42	9	12	3	19	5	2	3	5	23
Infratest dimap	9–13 Jan 2025	1,179	42	10	14	4	16	5	–	–	9	26
GMS	27 Dec – 2 Jan 2025	1,025	44	9	11	3	17	4	2	4	6	27
GMS	27 Nov – 2 Dec 2024	1,043	45	9	10	3	16	4	2	4	7	29
Infratest dimap	20–25 Nov 2024	1,156	45	9	13	3	17	4	–	3	6	28
GMS	7–11 Nov 2024	1,035	43	9	9	3	16	7	1	5	7	27
GMS	11–16 Sep 2024	1,048	42	9	10	3	15	8	1	5	7	27
Wahlkreisprognose	2–5 Dec 2022	1,944	33	18	15	6	12	8	2	–	6	15
Forsa	23 May – 3 Jun 2022	1,049	36	12	22	8	8	–	2	–	12	14
Forsa	27 Apr – 13 May 2022	1,235	34	14	21	8	8	7	2	–	6	13
2021 federal election	26 Sep 2021	–	31.7	18.0	14.1	10.5	9.0	7.5	2.8	–	6.4	13.7

=== Berlin ===
Polling firm	Fieldwork date	Sample size	SPD	Grüne	CDU	Linke	AfD	FDP	BSW	Others	Lead
2025 federal election	23 Feb 2025	–	15.1	16.8	18.3	19.9	15.2	3.8	10.6	4.2	1.6
Infratest dimap	14–18 Nov 2024	1,179	13	22	24	5	17	4	7	8	2
2021 federal election	26 Sep 2021	–	22.2	22.0	17.2	11.5	9.4	8.1	–	9.6	0.2

=== Brandenburg ===
Polling firm	Fieldwork date	Sample size	SPD	AfD	CDU	FDP	Grüne	Linke	BSW	Others	Lead
2025 federal election	23 Feb 2025	–	14.8	32.5	18.1	3.2	6.6	10.7	10.7	3.4	14.4
INSA	20–27 Jan 2025	1,000	20	28	19	3	7	6	11	6	8
Infratest dimap	4–7 Dec 2024	1,183	19	30	21	–	7	4	11	8	9
Forsa	6–10 Jan 2024	1,007	17	33	20	4	8	6	3	9	13
Wahlkreisprognose	4–11 Sep 2022	1,100	25	25	14	5	12.5	9	–	9.5	Tie
Wahlkreisprognose	9–17 May 2022	1,001	35.5	16.5	15.5	4	14	5.5	–	9	19
2021 federal election	26 Sep 2021	–	29.5	18.1	15.3	9.3	9.0	8.5	–	10.3	11.4

=== Hamburg ===
Polling firm	Fieldwork date	Sample size	SPD	Grüne	CDU	FDP	Linke	AfD	BSW	Others	Lead
2025 federal election	23 Feb 2025	–	22.7	19.3	20.7	4.5	14.4	10.9	4.0	3.4	5
Trend Research	16–20 Jan 2025	874	27	22	19	4	6	13	4	6	5
Trend Research	5–10 Dec 2024	880	28	19	19	5	6	11	6	6	9
Forsa	24–28 Oct 2024	1,017	21	22	25	4	6	8	5	9	3
2021 federal election	26 Sep 2021	–	29.7	24.9	15.4	11.4	6.7	5.0	–	6.8	4.8

=== Hesse ===
Polling firm	Fieldwork date	Sample size	SPD	CDU	Grüne	FDP	AfD	Linke	BSW	Others	Lead
2025 federal election	23 Feb 2025	–	18.4	28.9	12.6	5.0	17.8	8.7	4.4	4.2	10.5
Forsa	22 Nov – 11 Dec 2024	1,033	17	33	14	4	17	4	3	8	16
2021 federal election	26 Sep 2021	–	27.6	22.8	15.8	12.8	8.8	4.3	–	7.9	4.8

=== Mecklenburg-Vorpommern ===
Polling firm	Fieldwork date	Sample size	SPD	AfD	CDU	Linke	FDP	Grüne	BSW	Others	Lead
2025 federal election	23 Feb 2025	–	12.4	35.0	17.8	12.0	3.2	5.4	10.6	3.6	17.2
Forsa	28 Jan – 3 Feb 2025	1,004	15	30	20	7	3	9	11	5	10
Infratest dimap	20–25 Jan 2025	1,185	15	31	21	6	3	8	11	5	10
Infratest dimap	23–28 Oct 2024	1,153	16	26	25	4	–	5	15	9	1
Infratest dimap	2–7 May 2024	1,177	19	23	23	6	–	8	12	9	Tie
Forsa	25 Apr – 3 May 2024	1,005	15	27	23	6	3	7	13	6	4
Forsa	10–16 Jan 2024	1,002	15	32	22	8	3	8	5	7	10
Infratest dimap	13–16 Sep 2023	1,182	21	32	21	7	4	8	–	7	11
Forsa	18–23 Jan 2023	1,004	20	23	22	11	4	10	–	10	1
Infratest dimap	13–18 Oct 2022	1,168	25	24	20	10	4	9	–	8	1
Infratest dimap	1–4 Jun 2022	1,183	25	18	23	9	5	12	–	8	2
Forsa	14–18 Mar 2022	1,001	29	16	21	10	6	9	–	9	8
2021 federal election	26 Sep 2021	–	29.1	18.0	17.4	11.1	8.2	7.8	–	8.4	11.1

=== North Rhine-Westphalia ===
Polling firm	Fieldwork date	Sample size	SPD	CDU	Grüne	FDP	AfD	Linke	BSW	Others	Lead
2025 federal election	23 Feb 2025	–	20.0	30.1	12.4	4.4	16.8	8.3	4.1	3.8	11.1
Infratest dimap	13–16 Jan 2025	1,150	18	34	18	4	15	–	–	11	16
Forsa	26 Nov – 4 Dec 2024	1,508	18	36	14	3	14	2	4	9	18
Forsa	23 Jul – 1 Aug 2024	1,060	18	34	13	5	14	2	5	9	16
Forsa	5–14 Mar 2024	1,502	18	32	16	5	14	3	4	8	14
Forsa	29 May – 7 Jun 2023	1,506	23	30	15	7	15	3	–	7	7
Forsa	27–28 Mar 2023	1,005	22	32	18	6	10	4	–	8	10
Forsa	21–26 Sep 2022	1,511	21	30	22	6	10	4	–	7	9
Wahlkreisprognose	27–30 Jun 2022	1,040	25.5	25	22	8	8.5	3	–	8	0.5
Forsa	16 Feb 2022	1,008	25	30	25	6	6	2	–	6	5
Forsa	26 Jan – 2 Feb 2022	2,006	28	25	18	10	8	4	–	7	3
Forsa	26 Nov – 7 Dec 2021	2,009	29	23	18	12	7	4	–	7	6
2021 federal election	26 Sep 2021	–	29.1	26.0	16.1	11.4	7.3	3.7	–	6.5	3.1

=== Rhineland-Palatinate ===
Polling firm	Fieldwork date	Sample size	SPD	CDU	Grüne	FDP	AfD	FW	Linke	BSW	Others	Lead
2025 federal election	23 Feb 2025	–	18.6	30.6	10.4	4.6	20.1	2.1	6.5	4.2	2.8	10.5
Infratest dimap	5–10 Feb 2025	1,155	19	33	13	4	18	–	4	4	5	14
Infratest dimap	5–10 Dec 2024	1,175	19	35	12	4	16	3	–	4	7	16
Wahlkreisprognose	11–18 May 2022	1,042	30	30.5	19	5	5	–	1.5	–	9	0.5
2021 federal election	26 Sep 2021	–	29.4	24.7	12.6	11.7	9.2	3.6	3.3	–	8.8	4.7

=== Saxony ===
Polling firm	Fieldwork date	Sample size	AfD	SPD	CDU	FDP	Linke	Grüne	BSW	Others	Lead
2025 federal election	23 Feb 2025	–	37.3	8.5	19.7	3.2	11.3	6.5	9.0	4.4	17.6
Forsa	7–10 Jan 2024	1,507	36	9	23	4	6	8	4	7	13
2021 federal election	26 Sep 2021	–	24.6	19.3	17.2	11.0	9.3	8.6	–	9.9	5.3

=== Saxony-Anhalt ===
Polling firm	Fieldwork date	Sample size	SPD	CDU	AfD	Linke	FDP	Grüne	BSW	Others	Lead
2025 federal election	23 Feb 2025	–	11.0	19.2	37.1	10.8	3.1	4.4	11.2	3.3	17.9
Wahlkreisprognose	21–29 Jan 2024	1,000	12	20	28	5	5	5	17	8	8
Wahlkreisprognose	13–21 Feb 2022	1,005	21.5	21.5	19.5	13	7.5	7.5	–	9.5	Tie
2021 federal election	26 Sep 2021	–	25.4	21.0	19.6	9.6	9.5	6.5	–	8.4	4.4

=== Schleswig-Holstein ===
Polling firm	Fieldwork date	Sample size	SPD	CDU	Grüne	FDP	AfD	Linke	BSW	Others	Lead
2025 federal election	23 Feb 2025	–	18.8	27.6	14.9	4.7	16.3	7.8	3.4	6.5	8.8
Wahlkreisprognose	10–19 Feb 2022	2,000	28	22.5	22	10	6	4.5	–	7	5.5
2021 federal election	26 Sep 2021	–	28.0	22.0	18.3	12.5	6.8	3.6	–	8.7	6.0

=== Thuringia ===
Polling firm	Fieldwork date	Sample size	AfD	SPD	CDU	Linke	FDP	Grüne	BSW	Others	Lead
2025 federal election	23 Feb 2025	–	38.6	8.8	18.6	15.2	2.8	4.2	9.4	2.5	20.0
Forsa	6–10 Jan 2024	1,253	36	12	23	9	3	6	3	8	13
Wahlkreisprognose	5–11 Dec 2022	1,016	32	19.5	18.5	8.5	5	7.5	–	9	12.5
Wahlkreisprognose	3–4 Apr 2022	994	22.5	27	18	8	6	8.5	–	10	4.5
2021 federal election	26 Sep 2021	–	24.0	23.4	16.9	11.4	9.0	6.5	–	8.7	0.6

== By Western and Eastern Germany ==
=== Western Germany ===
Polling firm	Fieldwork date	Sample size	SPD	Union	Grüne	FDP	AfD	Linke	FW	BSW	Others	Lead
2025 federal election	23 Feb 2025	–	17.6	30.6	12.7	4.6	17.9	7.9	1.6	3.9	3.2	12.7
YouGov	17–20 Feb 2025	1,305 in West Germany	18	31	14	4	17	7	–	4	5	13
YouGov	14–17 Feb 2025	1,655 in West Germany	18	29	13	4	18	8	–	4	5	11
YouGov	7–10 Feb 2025	1,642 in West Germany	17	32	14	4	18	6	–	4	6	14
INSA	7–10 Feb 2025	2,006 in all of Germany	17	32	14	4	20	5	–	4	4	12
YouGov	31 Jan – 4 Feb 2025	1,720 in West Germany	19	31	13	4	19	5	–	5	5	12
YouGov	24–27 Jan 2025	1,397 in West Germany	16	31	14	3	20	4	–	5	5	11
YouGov	17–20 Jan 2025	1,464 in West Germany	20	30	15	4	17	3	–	5	6	10
YouGov	10–14 Jan 2025	1,389 in West Germany	20	31	14	3	20	3	–	4	5	11
YouGov	3–6 Jan 2025	1,528 in West Germany	18	31	15	5	19	2	–	4	6	12
YouGov	29 Nov – 3 Dec 2024	1,493 in West Germany	19	32	14	4	17	2	1	5	6	13
YouGov	8–12 Nov 2024	1,442 in West Germany	15	35	14	5	16	2	1	5	6	19
INSA	9–12 Aug 2024	2,008 in all of Germany	16	32	12	5	16	2	–	8	9	16
YouGov	31 May – 5 Jun 2024	1,492 in West Germany	15	32	12	4	16	3	2	7	8	16
INSA	22–27 Dec 2023	2,000 in all of Germany	16	34	13	5	20	3	–	–	9	14
Forsa	30 May – 5 Jun 2023	2,505 in all of Germany	19	30	16	7	13	5	–	–	10	11
INSA	23–26 Sep 2022	2,102 in all of Germany	19	28	21	8	12	5	–	–	7	9
2021 federal election	26 Sep 2021	–	26.1	25.6	15.9	11.9	8.2	3.7	2.5	–	6.1	0.5

=== Eastern Germany ===
Polling firm	Fieldwork date	Sample size	SPD	AfD	CDU	Linke	FDP	Grüne	FW	BSW	Others	Lead
2025 federal election	23 Feb 2025	–	10.9	34.6	18.4	12.8	3.1	6.5	1.3	9.9	2.5	16.2
YouGov	17–20 Feb 2025	376 in East Germany	11	31	22	10	4	9	–	9	5	4
YouGov	14–17 Feb 2025	476 in East Germany	12	27	23	12	5	7	–	9	5	4
YouGov	7–10 Feb 2025	441 in East Germany	14	31	19	9	3	8	–	11	5	12
INSA	7–10 Feb 2025	2,006 in all of Germany	11	32	22	8	3	9	–	11	4	10
YouGov	31 Jan – 4 Feb 2025	461 in East Germany	13	32	20	9	4	10	–	10	4	12
YouGov	24–27 Jan 2025	384 in East Germany	11	33	22	8	3	8	–	9	5	11
YouGov	17–20 Jan 2025	413 in East Germany	15	27	21	6	5	11	–	8	7	6
YouGov	10–14 Jan 2025	345 in East Germany	10	26	26	6	4	11	–	12	6	Tie
YouGov	3–6 Jan 2025	380 in East Germany	10	32	19	6	4	11	–	13	6	13
YouGov	29 Nov – 3 Dec 2024	386 in East Germany	13	28	20	6	3	9	1	16	4	8
YouGov	8–12 Nov 2024	363 in East Germany	11	31	26	6	4	7	1	11	3	5
INSA	9–12 Aug 2024	2,008 in all of Germany	11	28	22	5	5	6	–	15	8	6
YouGov	31 May – 5 Jun 2024	402 in East Germany	10	26	19	5	2	10	–	19	8	7
INSA	22–27 Dec 2023	2,000 in all of Germany	12	36	24	7	4	8	–	–	9	12
Verian	24 Oct – 15 Nov 2023	830 in East Germany	12	32	24	9	4	9	–	–	10	8
Forsa	30 May – 5 Jun 2023	2,505 in all of Germany	16	32	23	8	6	6	–	–	9	9
INSA	17 Apr – 5 May 2023	7,618 in all of Germany	20	26	23	9	8	10	–	–	4	3
INSA	23–26 Sep 2022	2,102 in all of Germany	15	27	26	8	7	14	–	–	3	1
2021 federal election	26 Sep 2021	–	24.1	20.5	16.8	10.5	9.5	9.3	2.1	–	7.2	3.6
