= Next Hessian state election =

- By 2028

All 110 seats of the Landtag of Hesse, including any overhang and leveling seats 56 seats needed for a majority
Party	CDU	AfD	SPD
Last election	52 seats, 34.6%	28 seats, 18.4%	23 seats, 15.1%
Current seats	52	25	23
Party	Greens	FDP
Last election	22 seats, 14.8%	8 seats, 5.0%
Current seats	22	8
Incumbent Government
Second Rhein cabinet
CDU–SPD

The next Hessian state parliament election is set to take place no later than 2028, It will elect the 22st Landtag of Hesse for a five-year term.

The incumbent government is the Second Rhein cabinet, headed by the Christian Democratic Union with support from the Social Democratic Party.

== Background ==
=== Election date ===
Article 79 of the Constitution of Hesse stipulates that the state parliament is elected for a five years term, with a new election being called no later than the end of that period. According to Section 1 of the Hessian state election law, the election must take place on a Sunday or public holiday. The day of the election is determined by the state government by ordinance.

Since the 20th state parliament was constituted on January 18, 2019, Sunday, January 14, 2024, is the latest possible date for the election to the 21st Hessian state parliament.

=== Electoral system ===
The Hessian Parliament sits a minimum of 110 deputies elected via Mixed-member proportional representation, those being 55 from the constituencies and 55 from the party lists. The running parties must however receive at least 5.0% of the valid votes in order to receive seats. The calculations for the distribution follows the Hare-Niemeyer method. Despite the number of 110 seats, overhang mandates and compensatory mandates often gives the diet a higher number of parliamentarians, the latest being 133 in total.

== Parties in the Landtag ==
Following the previous election, five parties were elected to the Landtag. Since then, the Alternative for Germany has been the only party to have suffered changes in the number of seats, as three of its members have been withdrawn from the party and the parliamentary group.

The distribution of seats in the parliament following 2023 election and its current configuration are as follows:

Name		Ideology	Leader(s)	Seats			Status
Name		Ideology	Leader(s)	Votes (%)	At first sitting	Currently	Status
CDU	Christian Democratic Union of Germany; Christlich Demokratische Union Deutschlands	Christian democracy	Boris Rhein	34.6%	52 / 133	52 / 133	Governing coalition
AfD	Alternative for Germany; Alternative für Deutschland	German nationalism Right-wing populism	Robert Lambrou	18.4%	28 / 133	25 / 133	Opposition
SPD	Social Democratic Party of Germany; Sozialdemokratische Partei Deutschlands	Social democracy	Nancy Faeser	15.1%	23 / 133	23 / 133	Governing coalition
Grüne	Alliance 90/The Greens; Bündnis 90/Die Grünen	Green politics	Tarek Al-Wazir	14.8%	22 / 133	22 / 133	Opposition
FDP	Free Democratic Party; Freie Demokratische Partei	Classical liberalism	Stefan Naas	5.0%	8 / 133	8 / 133	Opposition
Ungrouped					0 / 133	3 / 133	Opposition

== Opinion polling ==
=== Graphical summary ===
Local regression of polls conducted.

=== Party polling ===
Polling firm	Fieldwork date	Sample size	CDU	AfD	SPD	Grüne	FDP	FW	Linke	BSW	Others	Lead
Infratest dimap	19–22 Oct 2026	1,185	25	23	15	16	4	3	7	–	7	2
INSA	14–21 Apr 2026	1,000	30	22	15	13	3	4	7	–	6	8
INSA	3–12 Mar 2026	1,001	31	21	15	13	4	3	6	3	4	10
Infratest dimap	26–29 Jan 2026	1,148	32	20	16	14	3	–	6	–	9	12
INSA	30 Sep – 7 Oct 2025	1,000	32	20	15	12	4	3	7	3	4	12
Infratest dimap	12–18 Jun 2025	1,150	36	18	13	14	4	–	6	3	6	18
INSA	11–18 Mar 2025	1,000	31	19	14	12	3	–	9	5	3	12
Federal election	23 Feb 2025	3,580,983	28.9	17.8	18.4	12.6	5.0	1.3	8.7	4.4	4.2	10.5
Forsa	22 Nov – 11 Dec 2024	1,003	38	16	15	14	3	–	3	3	8	22
INSA	5–12 Aug 2024	1,000	32	18	13	13	5	4	2	8	5	14
2024 EP election	09 Jun 2024	2,553,153	30	13.6	16.4	12.9	6.3	2	2.5	4.4	11.9	13.6
Infratest dimap	18–23 Apr 2024	1,159	37	16	15	15	5	–	–	3	9	21
INSA	2–9 Apr 2024	1,000	33	18	14	12	4	4	3	6	6	15
2023 state election	8 Oct 2023	–	34.6	18.4	15.1	14.8	5.0	3.5	3.1	–	5.5	16.2
