= Alternative for Germany election results =

Alternative for Germany party's election results

This page is a list of the Alternative for Germany party's election results.

== Nationwide elections ==
=== Federal Parliament (Bundestag) ===
Election year	No. of constituency votes	No. of party list votes	% of party list votes & ranking	No. of overall seats won	+/–
2013	810,915	2,056,985	4.7 (#7)	0 / 631	
2017	5,317,499	5,878,115	12.6 (#3)	94 / 709	▲94
2021	4,699,917	4,809,228	10.4 (#5)	83 / 735	▼11
2025	10,177,318	10,328,780	20.8 (#2)	152 / 630	▲69

=== European Parliament ===
Election	List leader	Votes	%	Seats	+/–	EP Group
2014	Bernd Lucke	2,070,014	7.1 (#5)	7 / 96		ECR
2019	Jörg Meuthen	4,103,453	11.0 (#4)	11 / 96	▲4	ID
2024	Maximilian Krah	6,324,008	15.9 (#2)	15 / 96	▲4	ESN

== State legislative elections ==
=== Baden-Württemberg ===
Year	No. of overall votes	% of party list votes & ranking	No. of overall seats won	+/–
2016	809,311	15.1 (#3)	23 / 143	
2021	473,485	9.7 (#5)	17 / 154	▼6
2026	1,010,449	18.8 (#3)	35 / 157	▲18

=== Bavaria ===
Year	No. of overall votes	% of party list votes & ranking	No. of overall seats won	+/–
2018	1,388,622	10.2 (#4)	22 / 205	
2023	1,999,924	14.6 (#3)	32 / 203	▲10

=== Berlin ===
Year	No. of overall votes	% of party list votes & ranking	No. of overall seats won	+/–
2016	231,325	14.2 (#5)	25 / 160	
2021	145,712	8.0 (#5)	13 / 147	▼12
2023	137,871	9.1 (#5)	17 / 159	▲4
2026	296,601	16.3 (#3)	29 / 158	▲12

=== Brandenburg ===
Year	No. of overall votes	% of party list votes & ranking	No. of overall seats won	+/–
2014	119,989	12.2 (#4)	11 / 88	
2019	297,484	23.5 (#2)	23 / 88	▲12
2024	438,811	29.2 (#2)	30 / 88	▲7

=== Bremen ===
Year	No. of overall votes	% of party list votes & ranking	No. of overall seats won	+/–
2015	64,368	5.5 (#6)	4 / 83	
2019	89,939	6.1 (#5)	5 / 84	▲1
2023	0	Disqualified	0 / 87	▼5

=== Hamburg ===
Year	No. of overall votes	% of party list votes & ranking	No. of overall seats won	+/–
2015	214,833	6.1 (#6)	8 / 121	
2020	214,596	5.3 (#5)	7 / 123	▼1
2025	329,066	7.5 (#5)	10 / 121	▲3

=== Hesse ===
Year	No. of overall votes	% of party list votes & ranking	No. of overall seats won	+/–
2013	126,906	4.1 (#6)	0 / 110	
2018	378,692	13.1 (#4)	19 / 137	▲19
2023	518,763	18.4 (#2)	28 / 133	▲9

=== Lower Saxony ===
Year	No. of overall votes	% of party list votes & ranking	No. of overall seats won	+/–
2017	235,863	6.2 (#5)	9 / 137	
2022	396,839	11.0 (#4)	18 / 146	▲9

=== Mecklenburg-Vorpommern ===
Year	No. of overall votes	% of party list votes & ranking	No. of overall seats won	+/–
2016	167,852	20.8 (#2)	18 / 71	
2021	152,775	16.7 (#2)	14 / 79	▼4
2026	388,026	38.2 (#1)	32 / 71	▲18

=== North Rhine-Westphalia ===
Year	No. of overall votes	% of party list votes & ranking	No. of overall seats won	+/–
2017	626,756	7.4 (#4)	16 / 199	
2022	388,768	5.4 (#5)	12 / 195	▼4

=== Rhineland-Palatinate ===
Year	No. of overall votes	% of party list votes & ranking	No. of overall seats won	+/–
2016	268,628	12.6 (#3)	14 / 101	
2021	160,293	8.3 (#4)	9 / 101	▼5
2026	394,756	19.5 (#3)	24 / 105	▲15

=== Saarland ===
Year	No. of overall votes	% of party list votes & ranking	No. of overall seats won	+/–
2017	32,971	6.2 (#4)	3 / 51	
2022	25,719	5.7 (#3)	3 / 51	0

=== Saxony ===
Year	No. of overall votes	% of party list votes & ranking	No. of overall seats won	+/–
2014	159,611	9.7 (#4)	14 / 126	
2019	595,671	27.5 (#2)	38 / 119	▲24
2024	719,279	30.6 (#2)	40 / 120	▲2

=== Saxony-Anhalt ===
Year	No. of overall votes	% of party list votes & ranking	No. of overall seats won	+/–
2016	272,496	24.3 (#2)	25 / 87	
2021	221,487	20.8 (#2)	23 / 97	▼2
2026	576,037	43.8 (#1)	39 / 83	▲16

=== Schleswig-Holstein ===
Year	No. of overall votes	% of party list votes & ranking	No. of overall seats won	+/–
2017	86,711	5.9 (#5)	5 / 73	
2022	61,141	4.4 (#6)	0 / 69	▼5

=== Thuringia ===
Year	No. of overall votes	% of party list votes & ranking	No. of overall seats won	+/–
2014	99,548	10.6 (#4)	11 / 91	
2019	259,382	23.4 (#2)	22 / 90	▲11
2024	396,704	32.8 (#1)	32 / 88	▲10
