= Elisabeth Kula =

German politician

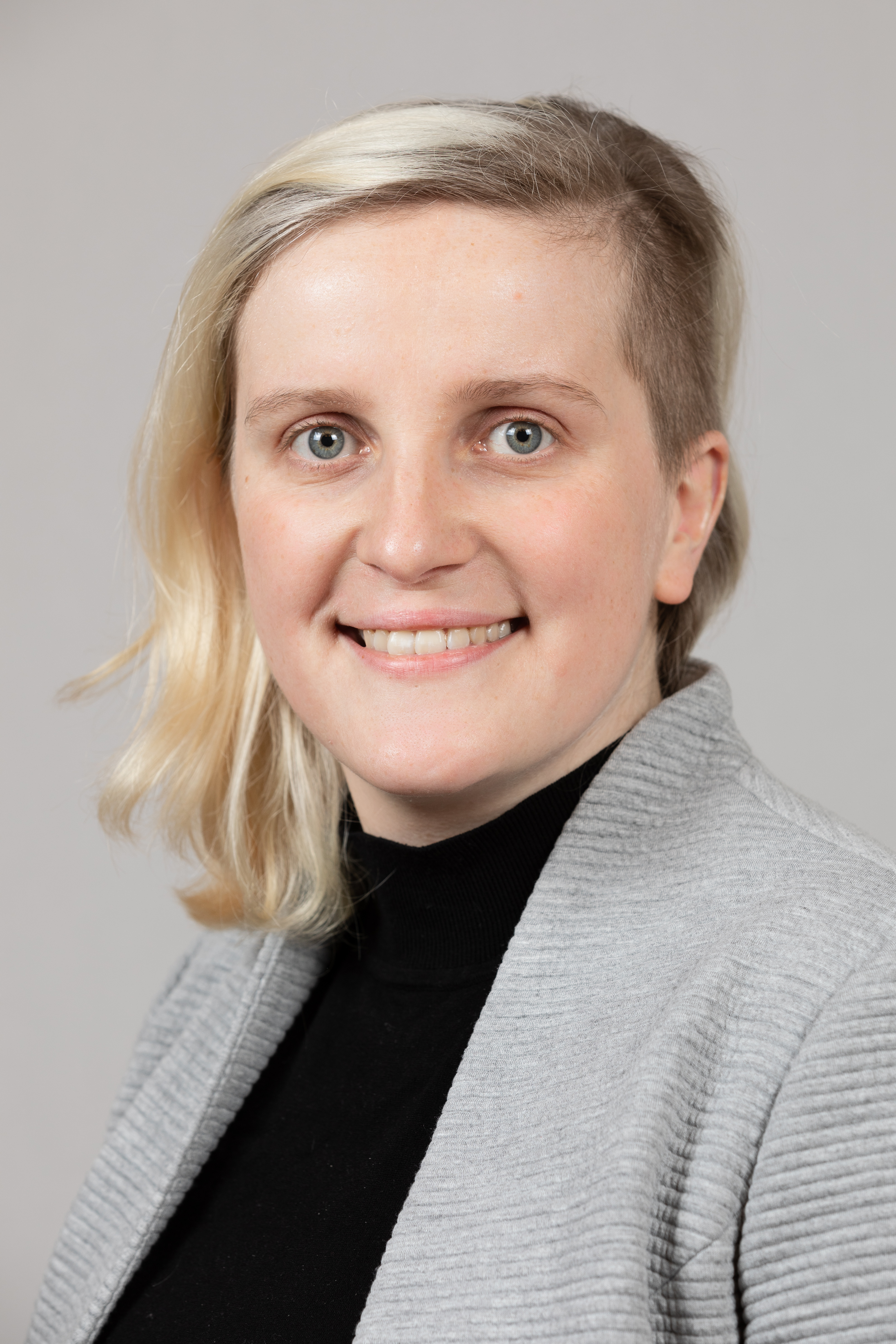
Elisabeth Kula in 2019

Elisabeth Kula (born 12 March 1990) is a German politician from Die Linke. She was a member of the Landtag of Hesse from 2019 to 2023. Since October 2021, she has been co-chair of the Left faction together with Jan Schalauske.

== Life ==
Kula was born in Lich. She studied economics at the University of Giessen from 2009 to 2010 and bachelor's and master's degrees in political science at the University of Marburg from 2010 to 2018 .

Kula has been a member of the Die Linke party since 2012 and a member of the state executive board of Die Linke Hessen since 2014. From 2016 to 2019 she held a mandate in the Marburg city council. In the 2018 Hessian state election, she received a mandate in the Hesse state parliament. In the 20th electoral term she is a member of the Cultural Policy Committee and spokesperson for the Die Linke parliamentary group for education, youth and school policy.

Kula was lead candidate on the list for the 2023 Hessian state election. In the election The Left were wiped out falling short of the 5% threshold needed for representation.

Kula is a member of IG Metall, the Left Youth Solid, Die Linke.SDS and the Socialist Left.

Kula lives with her wife in Wiesbaden.
