= Karin Mueller =

Politician from Germany

Karin Müller
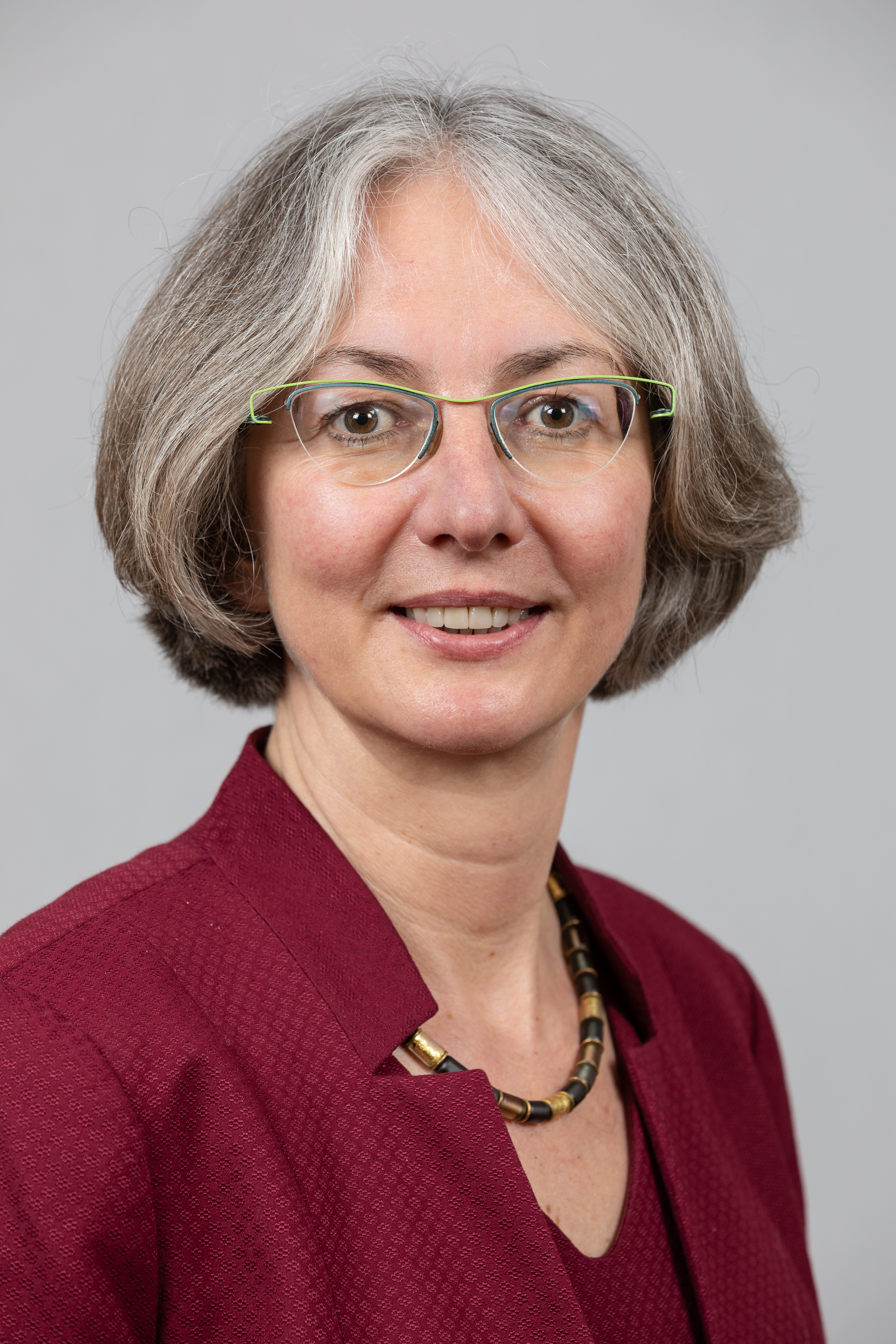
- Müller in 2019

Member of the Landtag of Hesse
- Incumbent
- Assumed office January 2019

Personal details
- Born: October 1962 (age 63) Kassel, Germany
- Party: Alliance 90/The Greens

Karin Mueller (German: Karin Müller; born 12 October 1962 in Kassel) is a German politician from Alliance 90/The Greens. She has been a member of the Hesse State Parliament since 2009. She has been vice president there since 2019.

== Life ==
Müller completed an apprenticeship as an administrative employee and, while working, did her Abitur at night school. She then completed her master's degree in sociology and political science in 1994.

Müller has been a member of the Greens in Hesse since 1994 and a member of the Kassel City Parliament since 2001. From 2006 to May 2010 she was parliamentary group leader there and was chairwoman of the environment committee until March 2009. In the state elections in Hesse in 2009, she stood as a candidate in the constituency of Kassel-Stadt II and was elected to the Hessian parliament in 15th place on the state list.

In the state elections in Hesse in 2013, she ran in the constituency of Kassel-Stadt I. Here she was defeated by Uwe Frankenberger. However, she managed to get into the state parliament by being placed on the party's list.

Karin Müller won the 2018 Hesse state election in the Kassel-City constituency II. In the state parliamentary group of Alliance 90/The Greens, she is spokesperson for the topics of transport and the Vice President of the Hessian state parliament.
