= Stefan Naas =

German politician (born 1973)

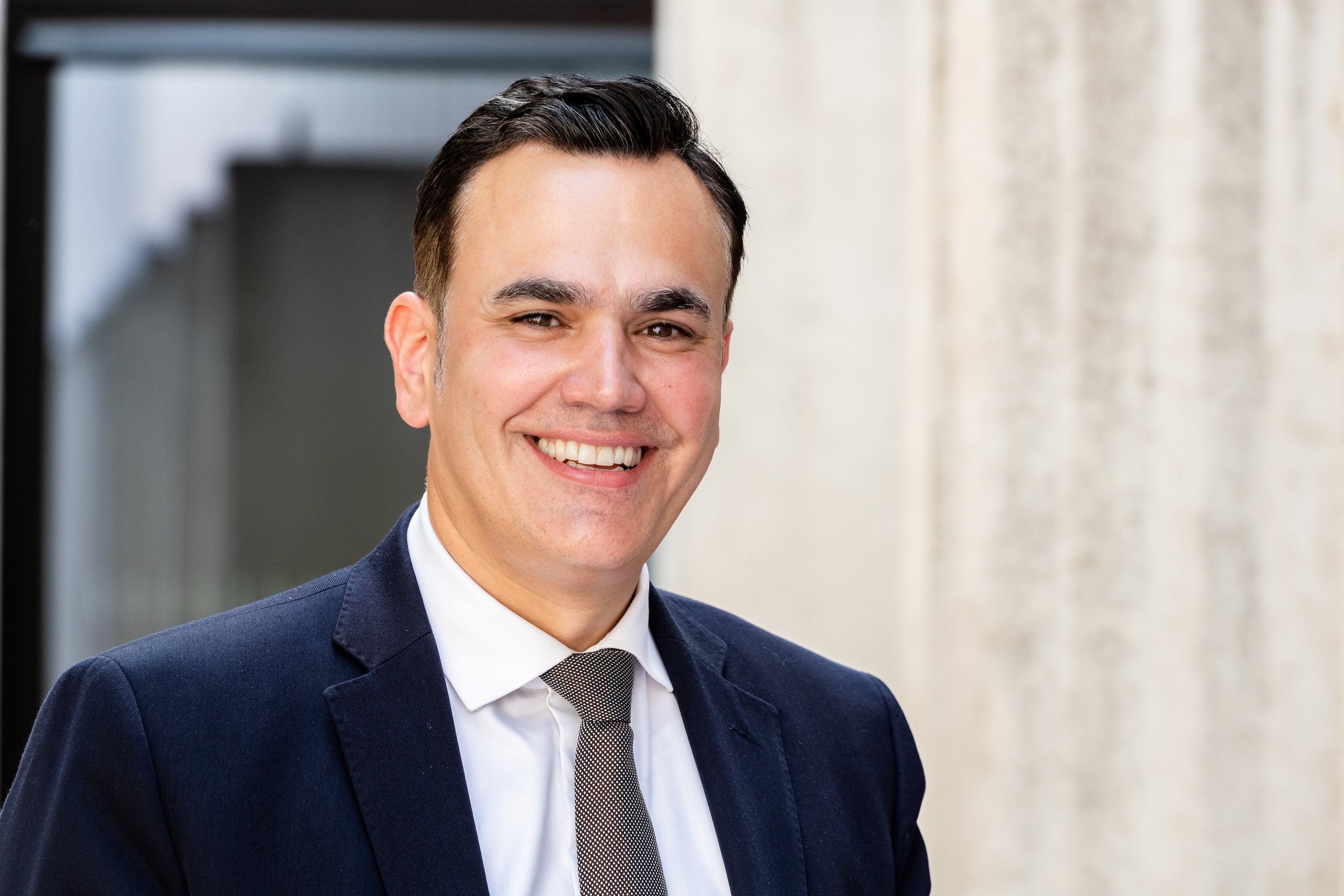
Naas in 2021.

Stefan Naas (born 23 November 1973) is a German politician from the Free Democratic Party. From 2009 to 2018 he served as mayor of the city of Steinbach (Taunus). He has been a member of the Landtag of Hesse since January 2019.

== Early life ==
Stefan Naas was born in Frankfurt and grew up in Steinbach (Taunus).

After attending the local Geschwister-Scholl elementary school and graduating from the Altkönigschule in Kronberg im Taunus in 1993, he first completed an apprenticeship at a bank.

From 1995 to 2000 he studied law at the Goethe University Frankfurt. He completed his second state exam at the same time as his doctorate in 2004. The subject of the dissertation was the Prussian Police Administration Act.

Until his election as mayor in Steinbach in 2009, Naas worked as a government councillor in the tax office in Frankfurt, and from 2006 to 2008 at the Hessian Ministry of Finance. From 2008 to 2009 he worked in the office of the Hessian Economics Minister Dieter Posch as a parliamentary and cabinet secretary.

== Political career ==
Naas was first elected to the local council in his hometown of Steinbach (Taunus) in 1993.

In 2001, he was elected to the district council of the Hochtaunus district. In the Steinbach mayoral election in 2009, Naas prevailed in the run-off against his challenger Michael Dill (CDU) with 62.7%. When he was re-elected in 2015, he received 87.1% of the vote.

In the Frankfurt Rhein-Main Regional Authority, he has been a member of the association chamber since 2007, was chairman of the FDP group from 2008 to 2011, chairman of the independent group from 2011 to 2018 and has served on the regional board since 2019.

In the Hochtaunus district, Naas is the chairman of the district parliamentary group. In addition, he has chaired the Rhine-Main FDP district association since 2014. Since 1 November 2016, he has been the leader of the FDP parliamentary group in the State Welfare Association of Hesse.

In the 2018 Hessian state election, Naas won a mandate as a member of the Landtag of Hesse in fourth place on the state list of the FDP. In his parliamentary group, he is spokesman for economic, industrial, labour market policy and housing, as well as spokesman for art and culture and spokesman for infrastructure.

On 20 July 2022, he was nominated by the state executive of the FDP as the top candidate in the 2023 Hessian state election.
