= Jan Schalauske =

German politician

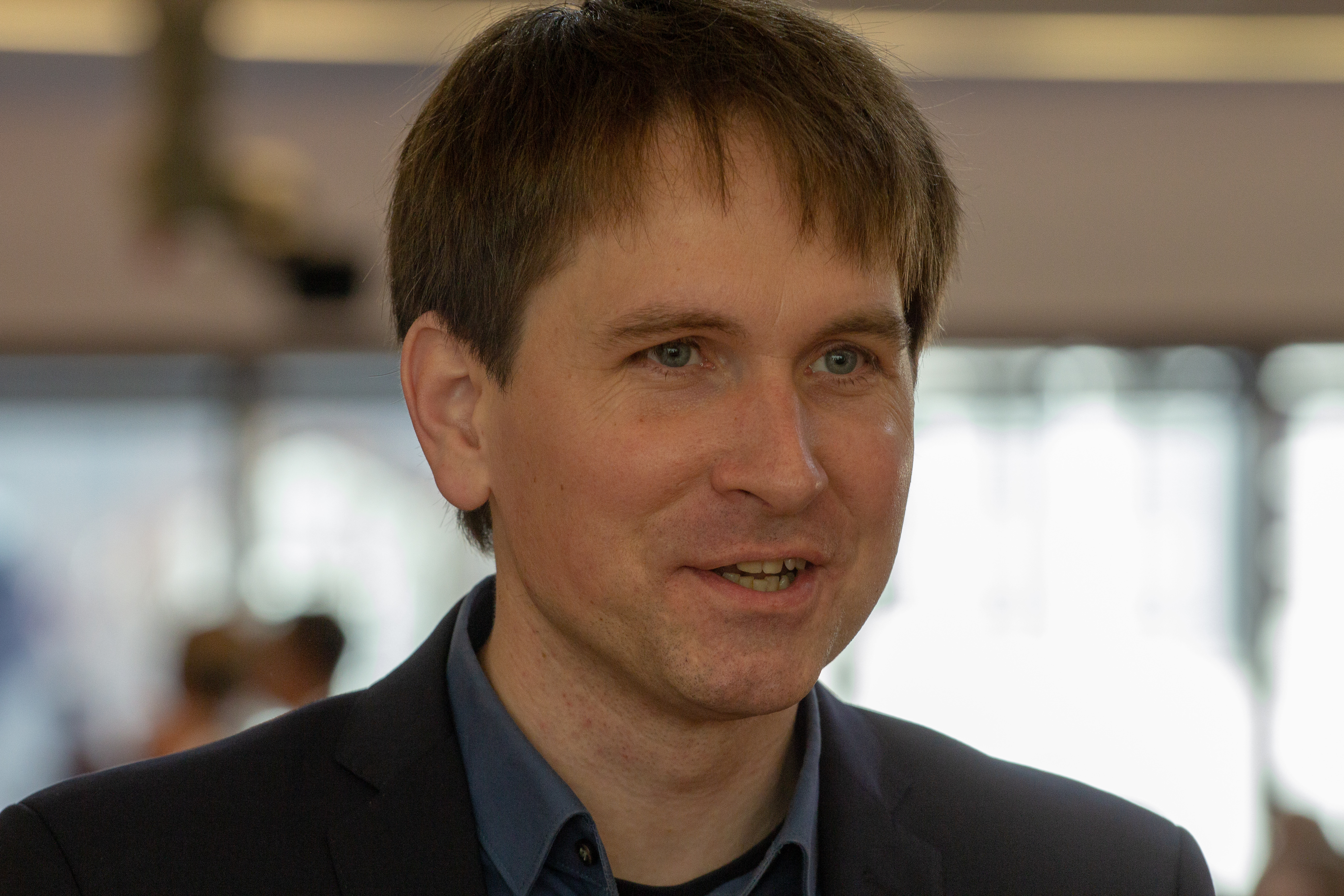
Schalauske in 2019

Jan Schalauske (born 31 December 1980) is a German politician from Left Party. From 2014 to 2022 he was one of the two state chairmen of Die Linke in Hesse. He was a member of the Landtag of Hesse from 16 April 2017 until 2023.

== Education and career ==
Schalauske was born in Lüneburg. From 2002, he studied political science at the Philipps University of Marburg, which he completed in 2009 with a degree in political science. From 2006 to 2017 he worked as a political scientist for the Bundestag member Wolfgang Gehrcke.

== Politics ==
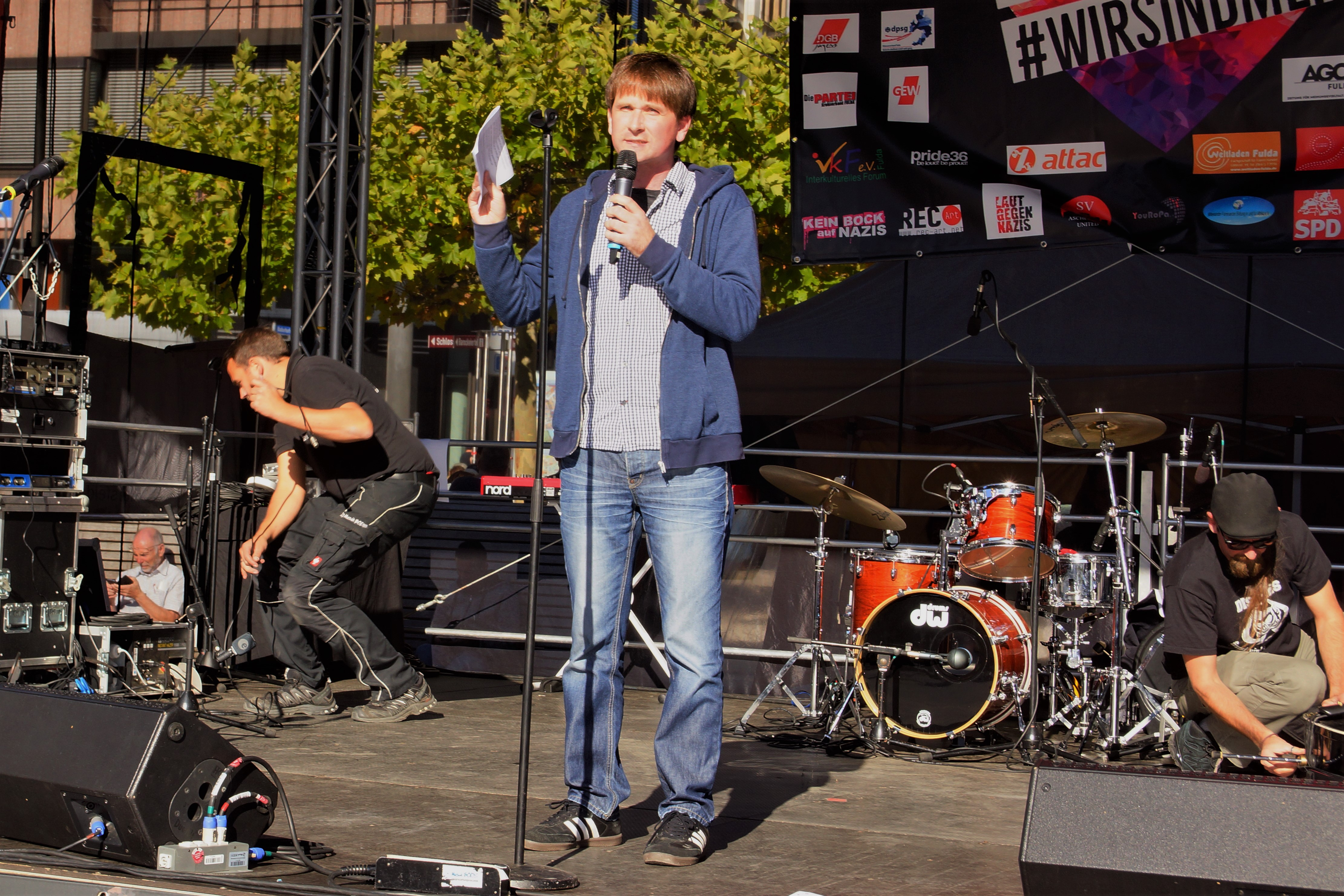
Schalauske in Fulda in 2018

Schalauske has been involved in the Left Party since 2005. From 2009 to 2013 he served as district chairman of the Left party in Marburg-Biedenkopf. He has been state chairman of the Left party since the end of 2014 in Hesse. Previously he was a member of the state board since 2008. In 2011 he was elected to the city council for the Marburg Left and has worked on the main and finance committee ever since. He served as parliamentary group leader since the 2016 Hesse local elections. From 2011 to 2016 he was chairman of the election preparation committee.

In the mayoral election in Marburg in 2015, Schalauske received 9.8 percent of the vote as a candidate from the Marburg Left and surprisingly came in third place, ahead of the candidate from the Alliance 90/The Greens party, which has traditionally been strong in the university city.

In the Hessian state elections in 2008, 2009, 2013 und 2018, Schalauske ran as a direct candidate in the “Marburg-Biedenkopf II” constituency and on the state list of the Die Linke party. On 16 April 2017, he moved to the Hessian state parliament as the successor to MP Willi van Ooyen in the Landtag and became a member of the European, Budget and State Debt Committee. In the 2018 Hessian state election, together with Janine Wissler he was the top candidate of the Die Linke party and was re-elected as a member of parliament. He was initially deputy chairman of his parliamentary group and has been together with Elisabeth Kula since October 2021 equal group leader.

He was second place on the list for the 2023 Hessian state election. In the election The Left were wiped out falling short of the 5% threshold needed for representation.

== Memberships ==
Schalauske is a member of: ver.di, Attac, VVN-BdA and the Hessian Rosa Luxemburg Foundation. He organizes the program of the Rosa-Luxemburg-Club Marburg.
