= 2023 Hessian state election =

- 8 October 2023

All 133 seats of the Landtag of Hesse, including 23 overhang and leveling seats 67 seats needed for a majority
- Turnout: 2,812,560 (64.9%) ▼2.4%
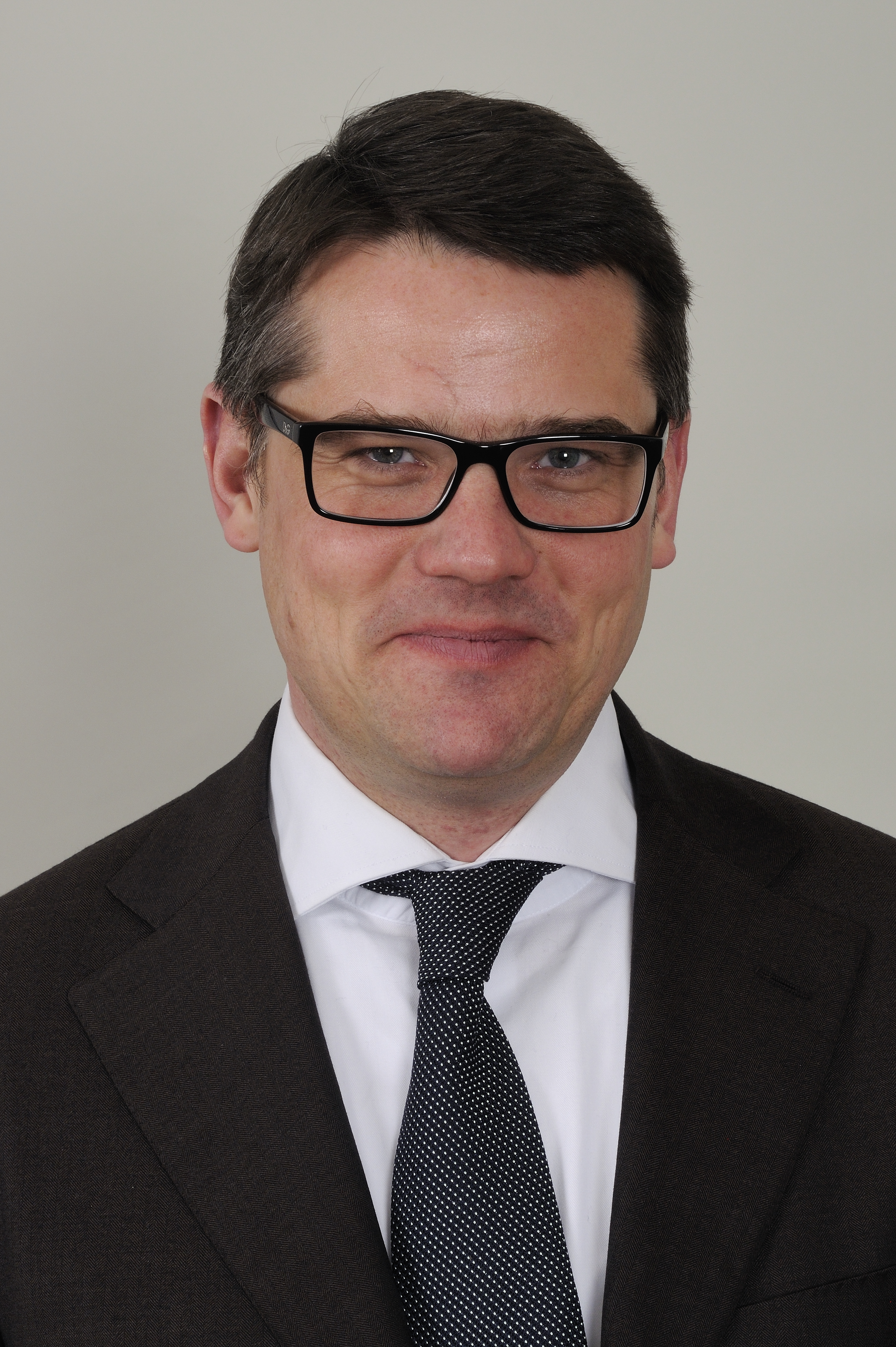

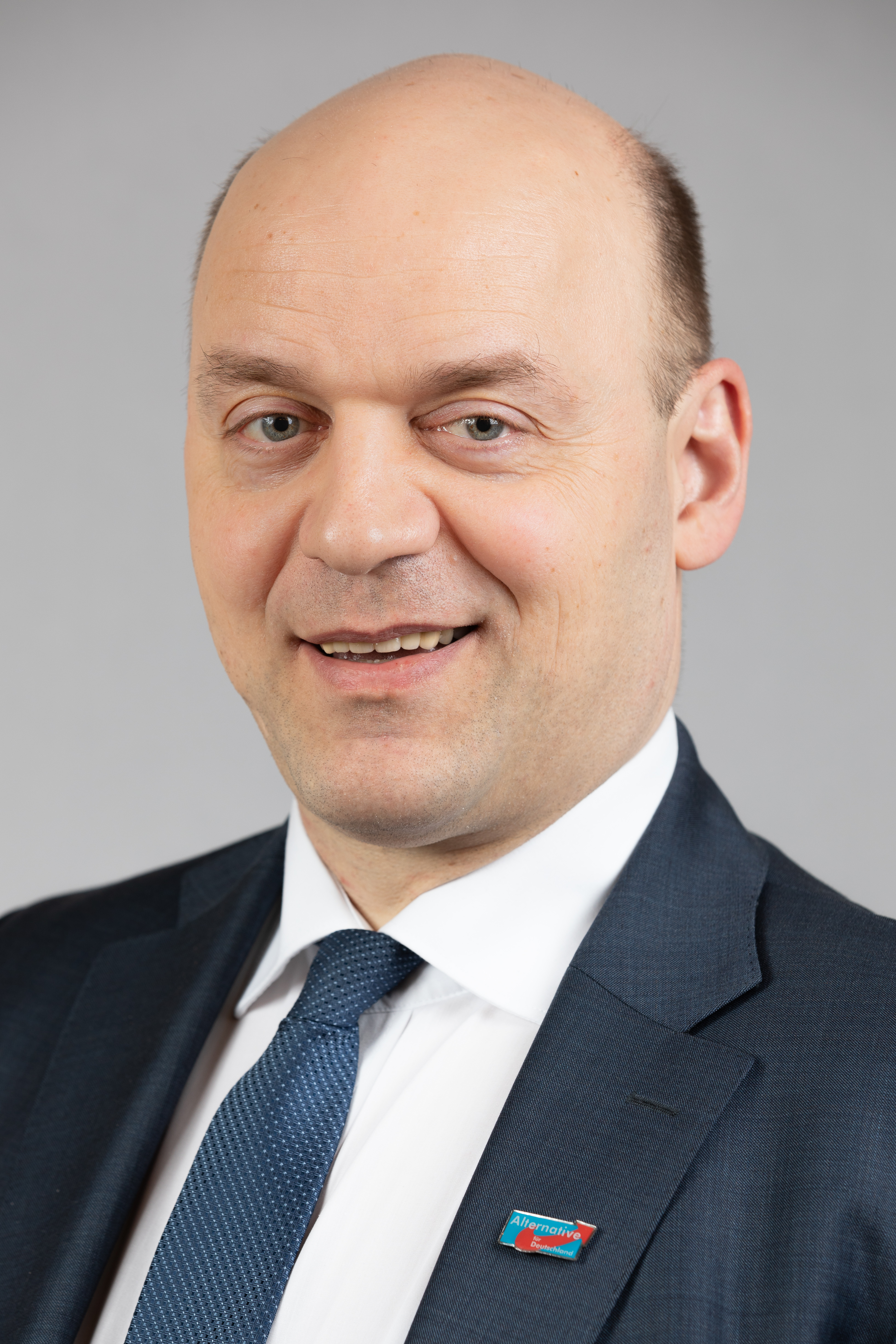

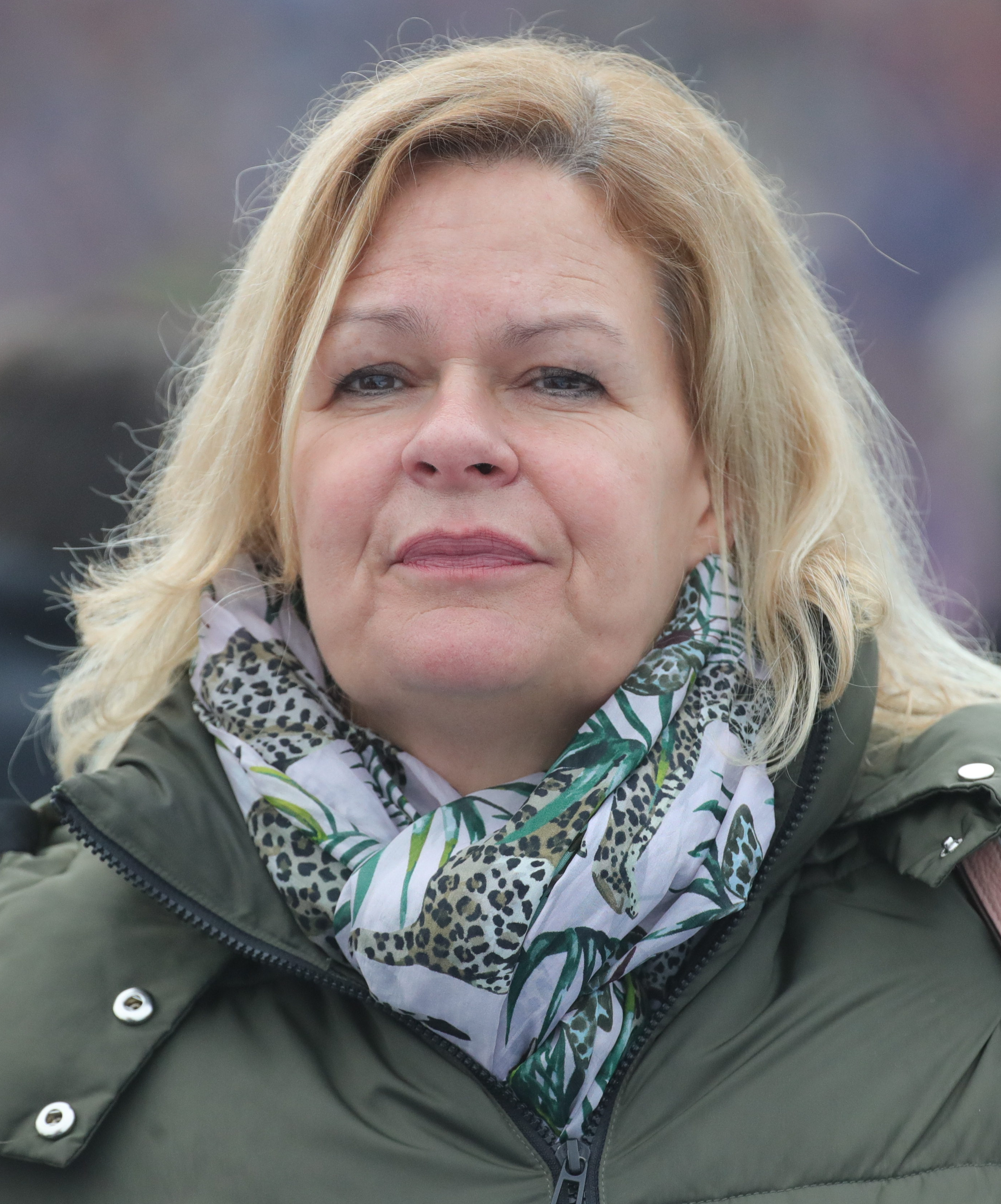

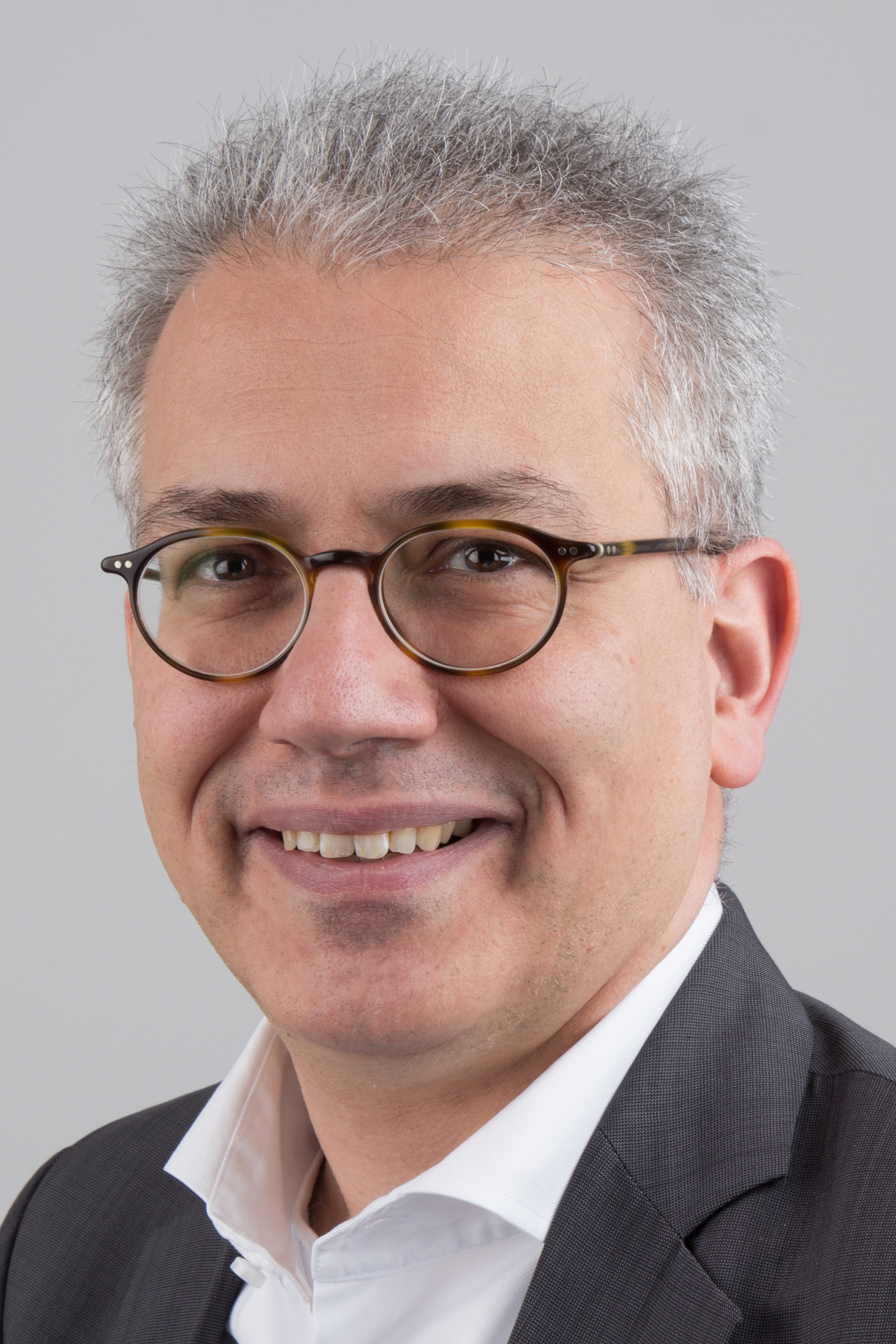

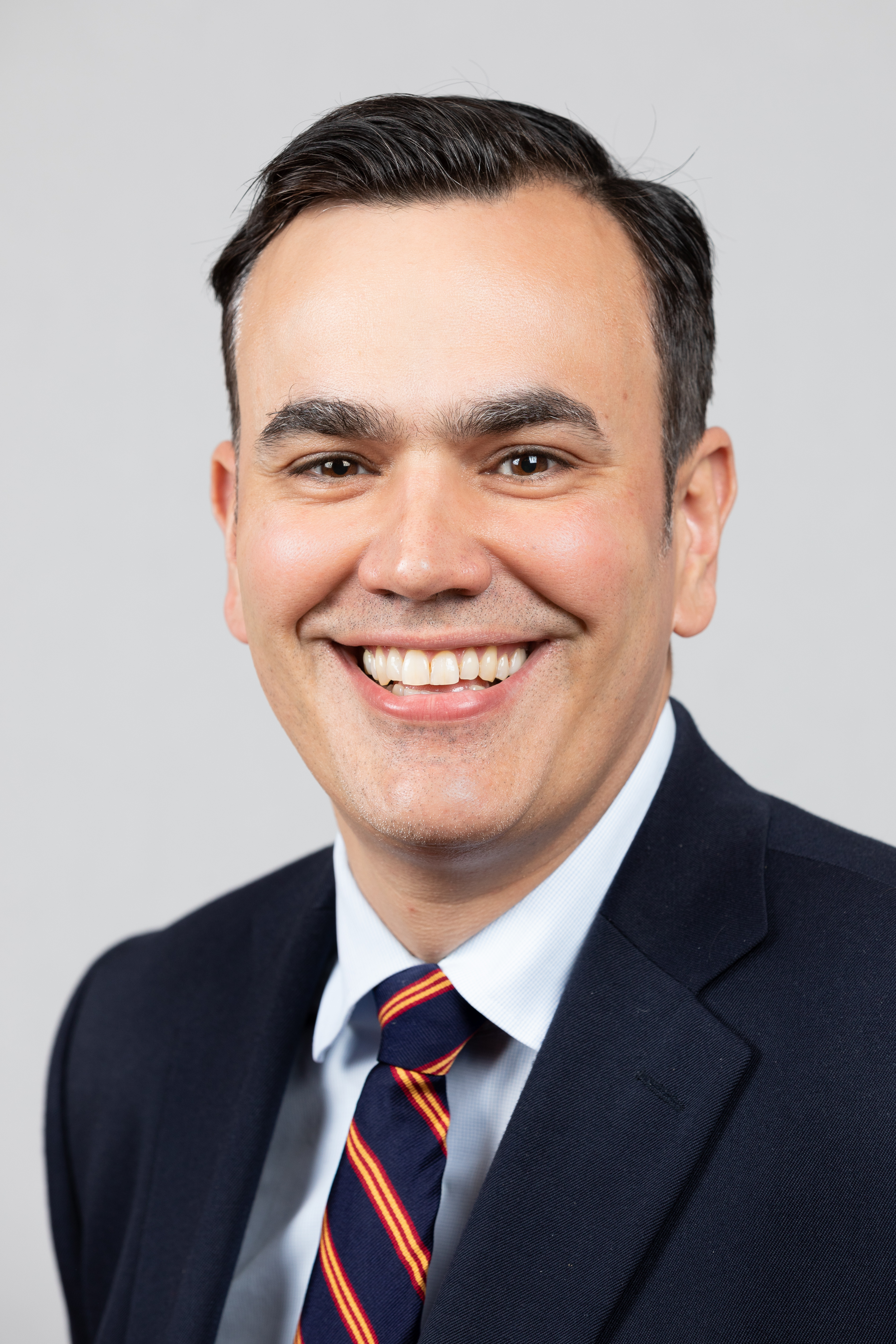

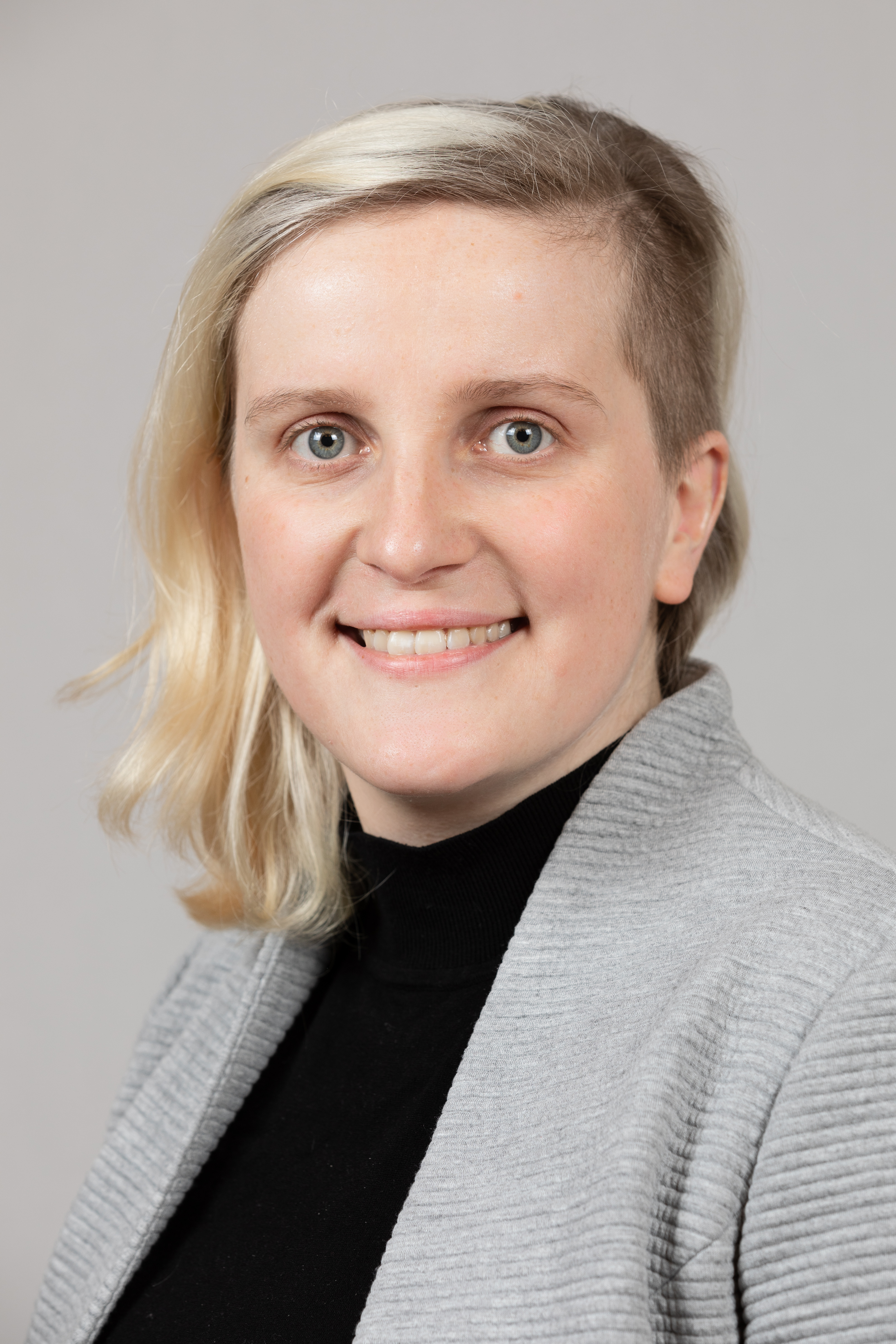

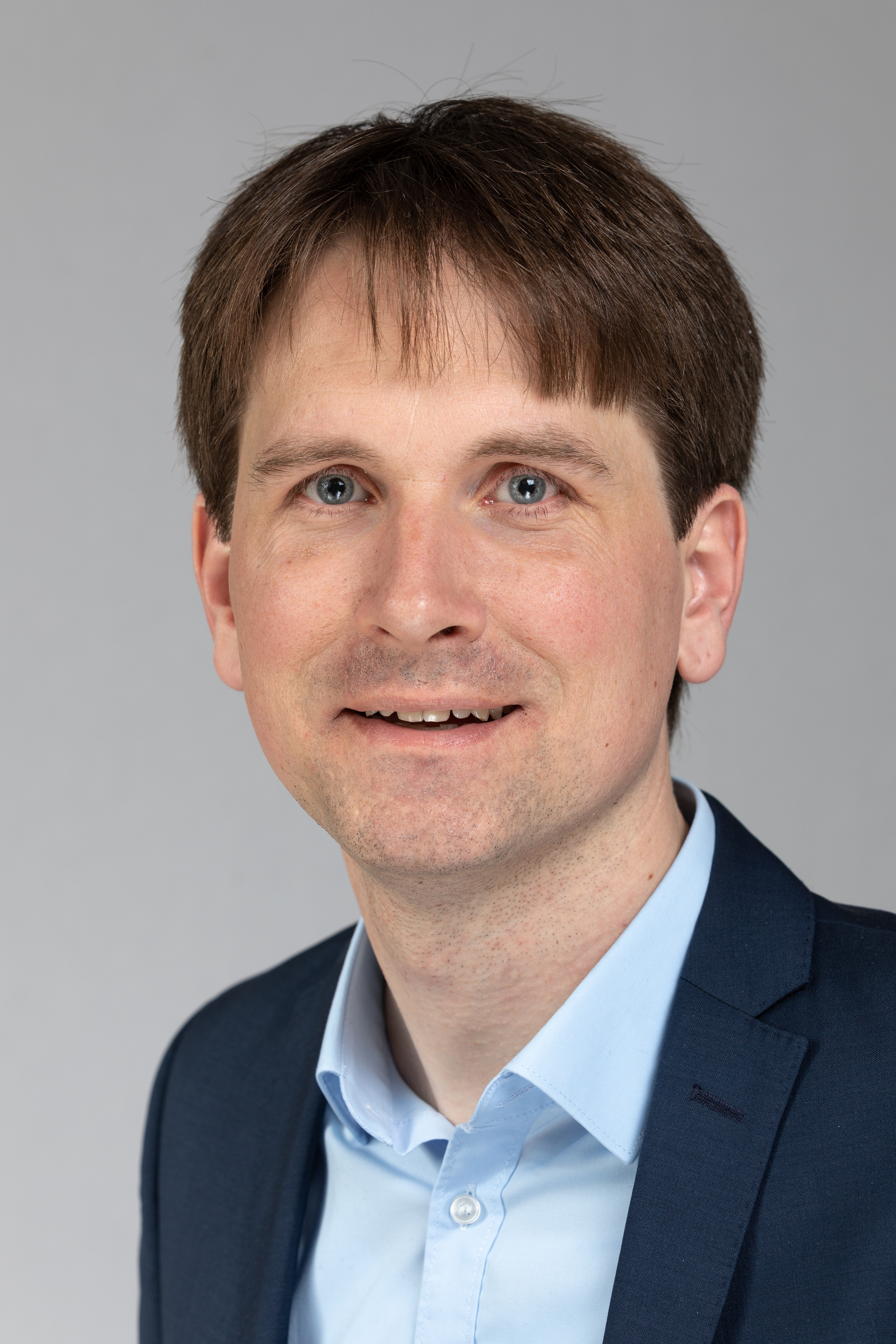
	First party	Second party	Third party
Leader	Boris Rhein	Robert Lambrou	Nancy Faeser
Party	CDU	AfD	SPD
Last election	40 seats, 27.0%	19 seats, 13.1%	29 seats, 19.8%
Seats won	52	28	23
Seat change	▲12	▲9	▼6
Popular vote	972,876	518,763	424,587
Percentage	34.6%	18.4%	15.1%
Swing	▲7.6%	▲5.3%	▼4.7%
	Fourth party	Fifth party	Sixth party
Leader	Tarek Al-Wazir	Stefan Naas	Elisabeth Kula; Jan Schalauske
Party	Greens	FDP	Left
Last election	29 seats, 19.8%	11 seats, 7.5%	9 seats, 6.3%
Seats won	22	8	0
Seat change	▼7	▼3	▼9
Popular vote	416,035	141,644	86,842
Percentage	14.8%	5.0%	3.1%
Swing	▼5.0%	▼2.5%	▼3.2%
- Map of the election, showing the winner of each single-member district and the distribution of list seats
Government before election
First Rhein cabinet
CDU–Green
Government after election
Second Rhein cabinet
CDU–SPD

The 2023 Hessian state elections was held on Sunday 8 October to elect the 21st Landtag of Hesse. The outgoing government was a coalition of the Christian Democratic Union and The Greens, led by Minister-President Boris Rhein of the CDU. The 2023 Bavarian state election was held the same day.

The result was a clear victory for the CDU, which took almost 35% of the vote on a swing of 7.6 percentage points. At 18%, the Alternative for Germany lifted its vote by over five points and became the second-largest party in a Western state for the first time. The Greens conversely lost five points, falling to fourth place on 15%, just behind the opposition Social Democratic Party (SPD) which suffered similar losses. The Free Democratic Party (FDP) narrowly passed the 5% electoral threshold with a 5.035% vote share. As of 2026, this is the last federal or state election where the FDP passed the threshold. Meanwhile, The Left fell to 3.1% and lost all their seats.

Overall, the incumbent coalition increased its majority, with a strengthened position for the leading CDU. The result, amidst a campaign dominated by federal issues such as immigration, was perceived as a blow for the federal government, with its three member parties – the SPD, Greens, and FDP – all suffering losses. The results also indicated the increasing popularity of the far-right AfD, which in previous months had moved into second place in federal opinion polling.

== Election organization ==
=== Election date ===
Article 79 of the Constitution of Hesse stipulates that the state parliament is elected for five years. The new election must take place before the end of the electoral period. According to Section 1 of the Hessian state election law, the election must take place on a Sunday or public holiday. The day of the election is determined by the state government by ordinance.

Since the 20th state parliament was constituted on 18 January 2019, Sunday 14 January 2024 would be the latest possible date for the election to the 21st Hessian state parliament.

On 17 January 2023, the Rhein cabinet decided to set 8 October 2023 as the election day. It follows the tradition that voting takes place in Hesse in the three months before the end of the electoral period. The Bavarian state election took place the same day.

=== Electoral system ===
Parties and voter groups that have not been represented in the state parliament without interruption since the last state election need 1,000 signatures for their state list and 50 for their district election proposals.

The Landtag is elected using mixed-member proportional representation. Every voter has two votes, one for a candidate on the state list and one for a candidate in their constituency. The state list of a party is elected with the state vote that is decisive for the allocation of seats in the state parliament.

Parliament seats are calculated using the Hare-Niemeyer method.

== Parties ==
The following parties were represented in the previous Landtag of Hesse:

Name		Ideology	Leader(s)	2018 result	
Name		Ideology	Leader(s)	Votes (%)	Seats
CDU	Christian Democratic Union of Germany; Christlich Demokratische Union Deutschlands	Christian democracy	Boris Rhein	27.0%	40 / 137
Grüne	Alliance 90/The Greens; Bündnis 90/Die Grünen	Green politics	Tarek Al-Wazir	19.8%	29 / 137
SPD	Social Democratic Party of Germany; Sozialdemokratische Partei Deutschlands	Social democracy	Nancy Faeser	19.8%	29 / 137
AfD	Alternative for Germany; Alternative für Deutschland	German nationalism Right-wing populism	Robert Lambrou	13.1%	19 / 137
FDP	Free Democratic Party; Freie Demokratische Partei	Classical liberalism	Stefan Naas	7.5%	11 / 137
Linke	The Left; Die Linke	Democratic socialism	Elisabeth Kula; Jan Schalauske	6.3%	9 / 137

== Opinion polling ==
=== Graphical summary ===
Local regression of polls conducted

=== Party polling ===
Polling firm	Fieldwork date	Sample size	CDU	Grüne	SPD	AfD	FDP	Linke	FW	Others	Lead
2023 state election	8 Oct 2023	–	34.6	14.8	15.1	18.4	5.0	3.1	3.5	5.5	16.1
Wahlkreisprognose	3–6 Oct 2023	949	34.5	16.5	15.5	15.5	4.9	2.5	4.5	6.1	18.0
Forschungsgruppe Wahlen	4–5 Oct 2023	1,000	32	17	17	16	5	3	4	6	15
Wahlkreisprognose	30 Sep – 3 Oct 2023	1,002	33	16.5	16	16	5.5	3	4.5	5.5	16.5
INSA	25 Sep – 2 Oct 2023	1,000	31	16	16	16	5	4	5	7	15
Civey	24 Sep – 1 Oct 2023	2,900	31	18	16	15	6	4	–	10	13
Forschungsgruppe Wahlen	25–28 Sep 2023	1,041	32	17	17	16	5	3	4	6	15
Infratest dimap	25–27 Sep 2023	1,515	31	17	16	15	6	4	4	7	14
Wahlkreisprognose	22–26 Sep 2023	1,000	30.5	18	16	17.5	5	2.5	4	6.5	12.5
Civey	7–14 Sep 2023	3,001	31	19	19	14	6	3	–	8	12
Wahlkreisprognose	9–13 Sep 2023	1,200	30	17	20	17.5	5	2	4	4.5	10
INSA	4–11 Sep 2023	1,000	29	19	20	15	6	3	4	4	9
Infratest dimap	5–9 Sep 2023	1,170	31	17	18	17	5	3	3	6	13
Forschungsgruppe Wahlen	4–7 Sep 2023	1,107	30	19	19	16	6	3	–	7	11
Civey	24–31 Aug 2023	3,002	29	20	18	16	6	3	–	8	9
Wahlkreisprognose	25–29 Aug 2023	1,000	29	16	20	18	5.5	2	4.5	5	9
Forschungsgruppe Wahlen	21–23 Aug 2023	1,005	31	18	20	15	6	3	–	7	11
Civey	9–16 Aug 2023	2,810	29	19	20	15	6	3	–	8	9
Wahlkreisprognose	18–23 Jul 2023	1,015	25.5	16	20	20	5	2	5.5	6	5.5
Wahlkreisprognose	23 Jun – 1 Jul 2023	1,400	26	18	20	19	5	2.5	3.5	6	6
INSA	5–12 Jun 2023	1,000	29	18	22	13	7	4	3	4	7
Wahlkreisprognose	17–22 May 2023	1,002	29	16	23.5	13	7	2	3	6.5	5.5
INSA	17–24 Apr 2023	1,000	30	20	21	12	7	4	3	3	9
Wahlkreisprognose	5–14 Apr 2023	1,398	28	18	24	12.5	7	2	3	5.5	4
Infratest dimap	7–11 Mar 2023	1,177	32	22	20	11	5	3	–	7	10
Wahlkreisprognose	3–7 Mar 2023	1,003	29	21	24	11	6	1.5	3	4.5	5
Wahlkreisprognose	3–6 Feb 2023	1,521	26	20	25	12	7.5	1.5	2.5	5.5	1
Wahlkreisprognose	23–27 Dec 2022	1,150	28	19	25	12	7	1.5	2.5	5	3
Wahlkreisprognose	25–27 Nov 2022	1,100	30	19.5	22	12	6.5	2	3	5	8
Wahlkreisprognose	24–28 Oct 2022	1,082	28.5	21	18	13.5	7	3	3	6	7.5
Infratest dimap	12–15 Oct 2022	1,161	27	22	22	12	6	3	–	8	5
Wahlkreisprognose	25–29 Sep 2022	1,000	30.5	21	15	14.5	7	4	3	5	9.5
Wahlkreisprognose	25–30 Aug 2022	1,010	29.5	26	15.5	9	7	3.5	3.5	6	3.5
Wahlkreisprognose	7–12 Jul 2022	1,043	29.5	26.5	20	7	6.5	2.5	3.5	4.5	3
Wahlkreisprognose	12–18 Jun 2022	1,200	32	27	18	7	6	3	2	5	5
Wahlkreisprognose	29 Apr–4 May 2022	1,023	28	24.5	21	7	8	3.5	2	6	3.5
INSA	4–11 Apr 2022	1,000	24	19	24	10	8	5	3	7	Tie
Wahlkreisprognose	3–10 Mar 2022	1,400	25	24	24	7	8	4	2.5	5.5	1
Infratest dimap	28 Feb–2 Mar 2022	1,169	27	20	24	7	9	5	–	8	3
Wahlkreisprognose	21–28 Jan 2022	1,102	25	19	26	9	8	6	3	4	1
Wahlkreisprognose	26 Nov–2 Dec 2021	1,000	21.5	18.5	24.5	9	13	5	3	5.5	3
INSA	11–19 Oct 2021	1,253	20	20	26	11	11	5	3	4	6
2021 federal election	26 Sep 2021	–	22.8	15.8	27.6	8.8	12.8	4.3	1.7	6.0	4.8
Wahlkreisprognose	5–11 May 2021	–	21.5	27	16	9.5	12	5	5	–	5.5
Infratest dimap	18–23 Feb 2021	1,001	32	21	17	10	7	6	–	7	11
Wahlkreisprognose	7–14 Dec 2020	–	32	21.5	18.5	12	6	6	–	4	10.5
Infratest dimap	1–7 Dec 2020	1,004	34	22	19	8	7	5	–	5	12
INSA	22–29 Oct 2020	1,018	30	19	18	11	6	9	–	7	11
Wahlkreisprognose	5–12 Sep 2020	–	31.5	22	16.5	13	5	8	–	–	9.5
Wahlkreisprognose	10–16 July 2020	–	30	21.5	20.5	12	5	7	–	–	8.5
Wahlkreisprognose	20–25 May 2020	–	36	20	20.5	9	5	5	–	–	15.5
Infratest dimap	12–13 May 2020	1,005	36	20	18	10	7	4	–	5	16
Wahlkreisprognose	6–14 Apr 2020	–	32	22	21	8	6.5	5	–	–	10
Infratest dimap	7–13 Feb 2020	1,000	26	25	16	12	7	8	–	6	1
INSA	4–16 Dec 2019	2,000	26	23	16	13	8	9	3	2	3
2019 EP election	26 May 2019	–	25.8	23.4	18.4	9.9	6.4	4.4	1.7	10.0	2.4
Infratest dimap	16–24 Apr 2019	1,001	27	21	19	13	9	6	–	5	6
2018 state election	28 Oct 2018	–	27.0	19.8	19.8	13.1	7.5	6.3	3.0	3.6	7.2

=== Minister-president polling ===
Polling firm	Fieldwork date	Sample size					None/ Unsure	Lead
Polling firm	Fieldwork date	Sample size	Rhein CDU	Al-Wazir Grüne	Faeser SPD	Lambrou AfD	None/ Unsure	Lead
Infratest dimap	8 Oct 2023	–	38	23	15	–	24	15
Forschungsgruppe Wahlen	8 Oct 2023	–	50	30	–	–	20	19
Forschungsgruppe Wahlen	8 Oct 2023	–	61	–	21	–	18	40
Wahlkreisprognose	3–6 Oct 2023	949	38	17	14	14	17	21
Forschungsgruppe Wahlen	4–5 Oct 2023	1,000	44	33	–	–	23	11
Forschungsgruppe Wahlen	4–5 Oct 2023	1,000	55	–	24	–	21	31
Wahlkreisprognose	30 Sep – 3 Oct 2023	1,002	35	17	11	12	25	18
Forschungsgruppe Wahlen	25–28 Sep 2023	1,041	44	31	–	–	25	13
Forschungsgruppe Wahlen	25–28 Sep 2023	1,041	55	–	21	–	24	34
Infratest dimap	25–27 Sep 2023	1,515	35	19	14	–	32	16
Wahlkreisprognose	22–26 Sep 2023	1,000	33	18	13	11	25	15
Wahlkreisprognose	9–13 Sep 2023	1,200	31	16	16	10	27	15
Wahlkreisprognose	9–13 Sep 2023	1,200	40	–	24	–	36	16
Infratest dimap	5–9 Sep 2023	1,170	33	21	17	–	29	12
Forschungsgruppe Wahlen	4–7 Sep 2023	1,107	42	31	–	–	27	11
Forschungsgruppe Wahlen	4–7 Sep 2023	1,107	50	–	26	–	24	24
Wahlkreisprognose	25–29 Aug 2023	1,000	30	15	21	12	22	9
Wahlkreisprognose	25–29 Aug 2023	1,000	32	–	27	–	41	5
Forschungsgruppe Wahlen	21–23 Aug 2023	1,005	44	31	–	–	25	13
Forschungsgruppe Wahlen	21–23 Aug 2023	1,005	50	–	28	–	22	22
Wahlkreisprognose	18–23 Jul 2023	1,015	28	15	20	7	30	8
Wahlkreisprognose	18–23 Jul 2023	1,015	31	–	28	–	41	3
Wahlkreisprognose	23 Jun – 1 Jul 2023	1,400	30	17	20	–	33	10
Wahlkreisprognose	17–22 May 2023	1,002	37	19	23	–	21	14
Wahlkreisprognose	5–14 Apr 2023	1,398	34	23	24	–	19	10
Infratest dimap	7–11 Mar 2023	1,177	32	23	17	–	28	9
Wahlkreisprognose	3–7 Mar 2023	1,003	34	23	25	–	18	9
Wahlkreisprognose	3–6 Feb 2023	1,521	32	20	27	–	21	5
Wahlkreisprognose	23–27 Dec 2022	1,150	32	20	25	–	23	7
Wahlkreisprognose	25–27 Nov 2022	1,100	36	15	26	–	23	10
Wahlkreisprognose	24–28 Oct 2022	1,082	37	19	24	–	20	13
Infratest dimap	12–15 Oct 2022	1,161	30	21	17	–	32	9
Wahlkreisprognose	25–29 Sep 2022	1,400	39	19	19	–	23	20
Wahlkreisprognose	25–30 Aug 2022	1,010	36	24	20	–	20	12
Wahlkreisprognose	7–12 Jul 2022	1,043	35	25	23	–	17	10
Wahlkreisprognose	10–17 Jun 2022	1,123	41	30	17	–	12	11
Wahlkreisprognose	29 Apr – 4 May 2022	1,023	30	28	23	–	19	2
Wahlkreisprognose	3–10 Mar 2022	1,400	26	28	22	–	24	2
Infratest dimap	28 Feb – 2 Mar 2022	1,169	26	23	20	–	31	3

== Election result ==

Summary of the 8 October 2023 election results for the Landtag of Hesse
Party	Constituency (Note: Erststimmen)			Party list (Note: Zweitstimmen)				Total seats	+/-
Party	Votes	%	Seats	Votes	%	+/-	Seats	Total seats	+/-
Christian Democratic Union	997,870	35.6	52	972,876	34.6	+7.6	0	52	▲12
Alternative for Germany	490,894	17.5	0	518,763	18.4	+5.3	28	28	▲9
Social Democratic Party	512,349	18.3	0	424,587	15.1	-4.7	23	23	▼6
Alliance 90/The Greens	397,680	14.2	3	416,035	14.8	-5.0	19	22	▼7
Free Democratic Party	137,318	4.9	0	141,644	5.0	-2.5	8	8	▼3
Free Voters	131,108	4.7	0	98,283	3.5	+0.5	0	0	0
The Left	90,520	3.2	0	86,842	3.1	-3.2	0	0	▼9
Human Environment Animal Protection Party	5,181	0.2	0	43,341	1.5	+0.5	0	0	0
Volt Germany	13,729	0.5	0	27,612	1.0	New	0	0	New
Die PARTEI	18,595	0.7	0	23,678	0.8	+0.2	0	0	0
Grassroots Democratic Party	4,285	0.2	0	13,707	0.5	New	0	0	New
V-Partei^{3}	155	0.0	0	9,472	0.3	+0.2	0	0	0
Pirate Party Germany	1,348	0.0	0	8,618	0.3	-0.1	0	0	0
Climate List Germany	951	0.0	0	6,212	0.2	New	0	0	New
Ecological Democratic Party	–			5,906	0.2	-0.1	0	0	0
Action Citizens for Justice	324	0.0	0	4,442	0.2	New	0	0	New
Party of Humanists	878	0.0	0	4,262	0.2	+0.1	0	0	0
German Communist Party	776	0.0	0	2,229	0.1	New	0	0	New
Anarchist Pogo Party	91	0.0	0	1,929	0.1	New	0	0	New
Party for Rejuvenation Research	–			1,506	0.1	0.0	0	0	0
The New Centre	–			1,369	0.0	New	0	0	New
Resident Representatives	880	0.0	0	–			0	0	0
Alliance C	756	0.0	0	–			0	0	New
Practitioner Party	421	0.0	0	–			0	0	New
Bürgerliste Weiterdenken	187	0.0	0	–			0	0	New
Solidarity, Justice, Change	162	0.0	0	–			0	0	New
Solibew	124	0.0	0	–			0	0	New
MERA25	99	0.0	0	–			0	0	New
Total	2,806,681	100.00	55	2,813,313	100.00		78	133	▼4
Invalid	51,632	1.8		45,000	1.6				
Turnout	2,858,313	66.0		2,858,313	66.0	-1.3			
Registered voters	4,332,235			4,332,235					

Results of the election by municipality

CDU vote

AfD vote

SPD vote

Green vote

FDP vote

FW vote

Linke vote

== State government formation ==
Immediately after the elections, Prime Minister Boris Rhein announced that he wanted to hold exploratory talks with his previous coalition partner, the Greens, as well as with the SPD and FDP. According to Rhein, five rounds of talks took place between the CDU and the Greens as well as with the SPD in the following weeks.

On 10 November 2023, Rhein announced his intention to end the previous coalition between the CDU and the Greens and instead govern with the SPD. The CDU state executive committee and the parliamentary group in the state parliament had previously unanimously accepted the decision for negotiations. Rhein stated that the decision had "not been taken lightly" and had been "seriously considered".

The committees of the SPD Hesse also voted unanimously to start coalition negotiations with the CDU. Previously, Federal Minister of the Interior Nancy Faeser, the SPD's top candidate in the state elections in Hesse, had rejected a move to Wiesbaden.

The new Hessian state parliament was constituted on 18 January 2024.
