= René Rock =

German politician (born 1967)

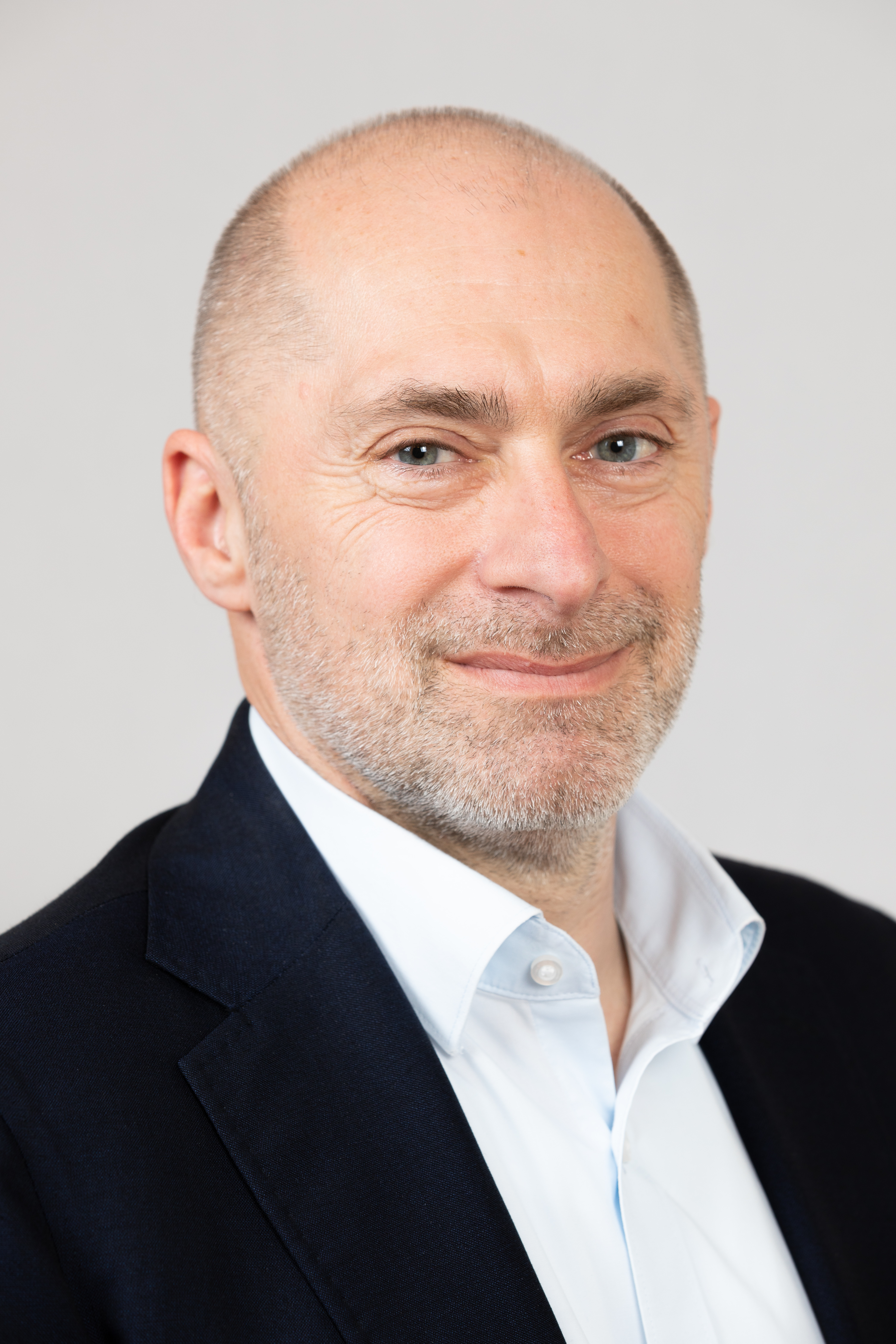
- Rock in 2019

Member of the Landtag of Hesse
- Incumbent
- Assumed office 5 April 2008

Personal details
- Born: 29 November 1967 (age 58) Offenbach am Main
- Party: Free Democratic Party (since 1993)

René Rock (born 29 November 1967 in Offenbach am Main) is a German politician serving as a member of the Landtag of Hesse since 2008. He has served as vice president of the Landtag since 2024.
