= Robert Lambrou =

German politician (born 1967)

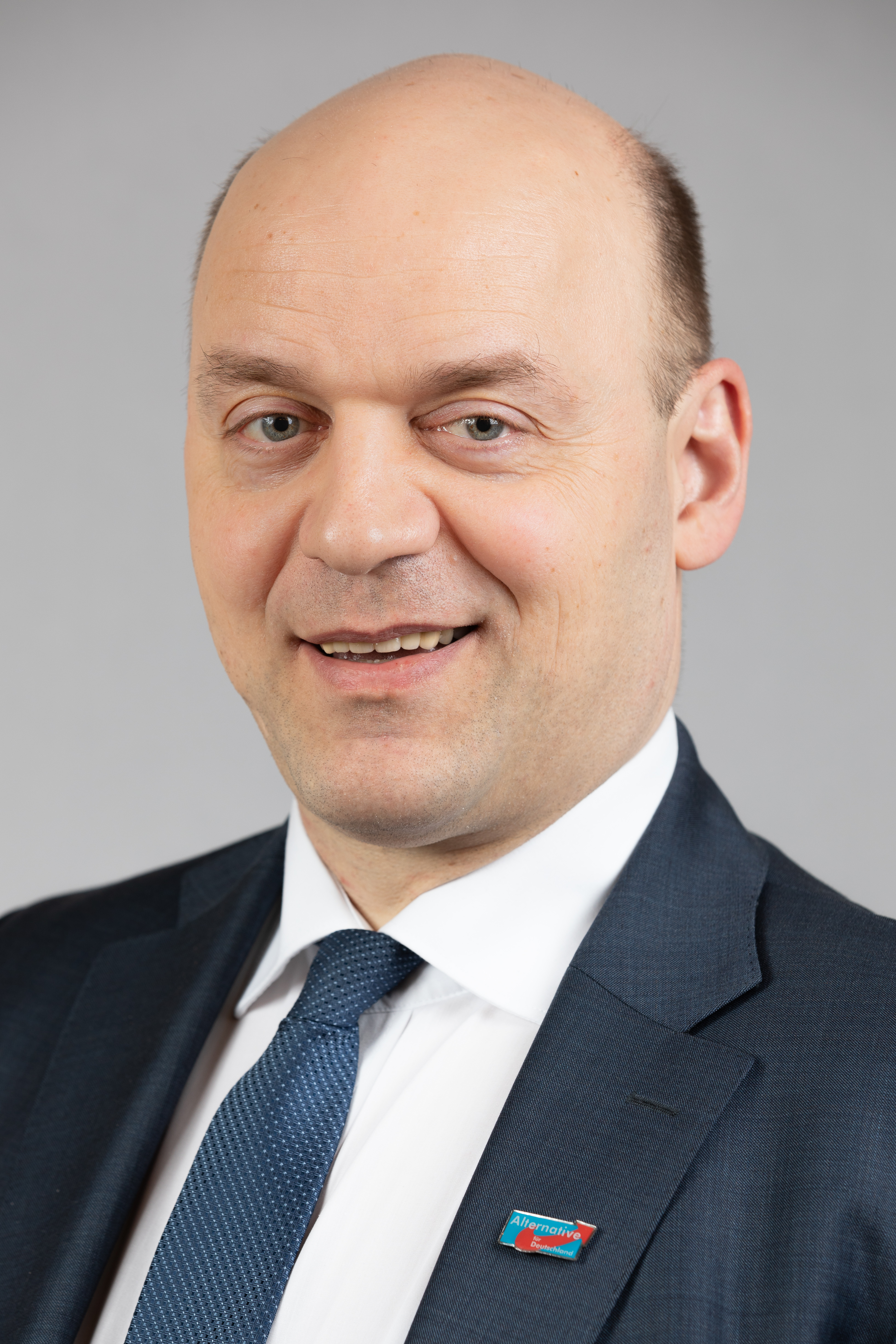
Robert Lambrou in 2019.

Robert Lambrou (born 12 September 1967 in Münster) is a German politician from Alternative for Germany.

== Life ==
Lambrou is of Greek and German heritage, from his father and his mother respectively. In the 1990s he was a member of the SPD. Lambrou works as a business graduate in Hesse. He is one of the two state chairmen of the AfD Hessen.

In the 2018 Hessian state election, he was in second place on the AfD state list and (as in 2013) in the Wiesbaden II constituency, as he is member of Landtag of Hesse and is the leader of the AfD parliamentary group there.

Lambrou lives in Wiesbaden.

== Positions ==
Lambrou is positive about a AfD-CDU cooperation and said in summer 2023 a coalition between AfD and CDU was only a matter of time.
