= 2018 Hessian state election =

2018 Hesse state election
- 28 October 2018

All 137 seats of the Landtag of Hesse, including 27 overhang and leveling seats 69 seats needed for a majority
- Turnout: 2,881,261 (67.3%) ▼5.9%
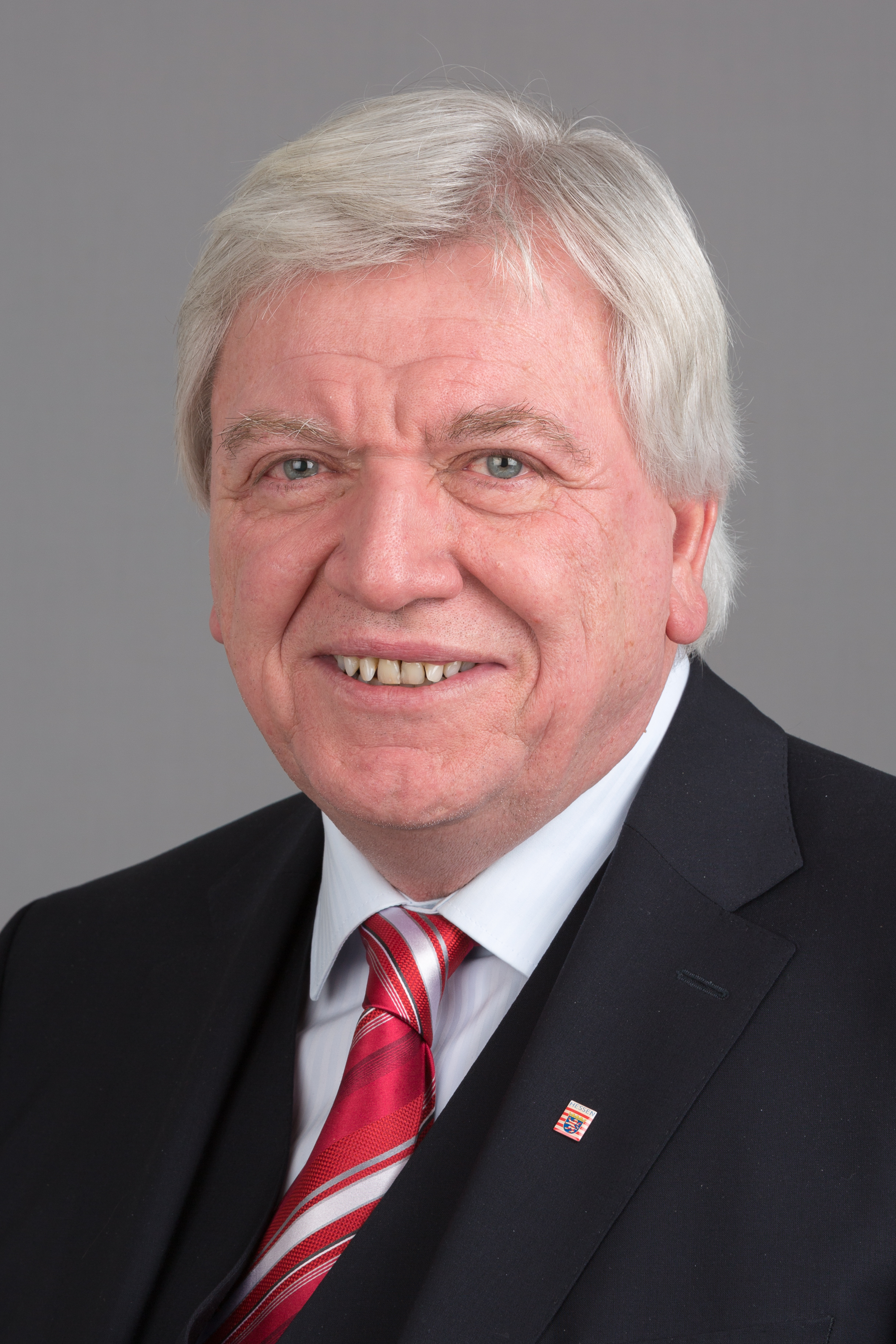

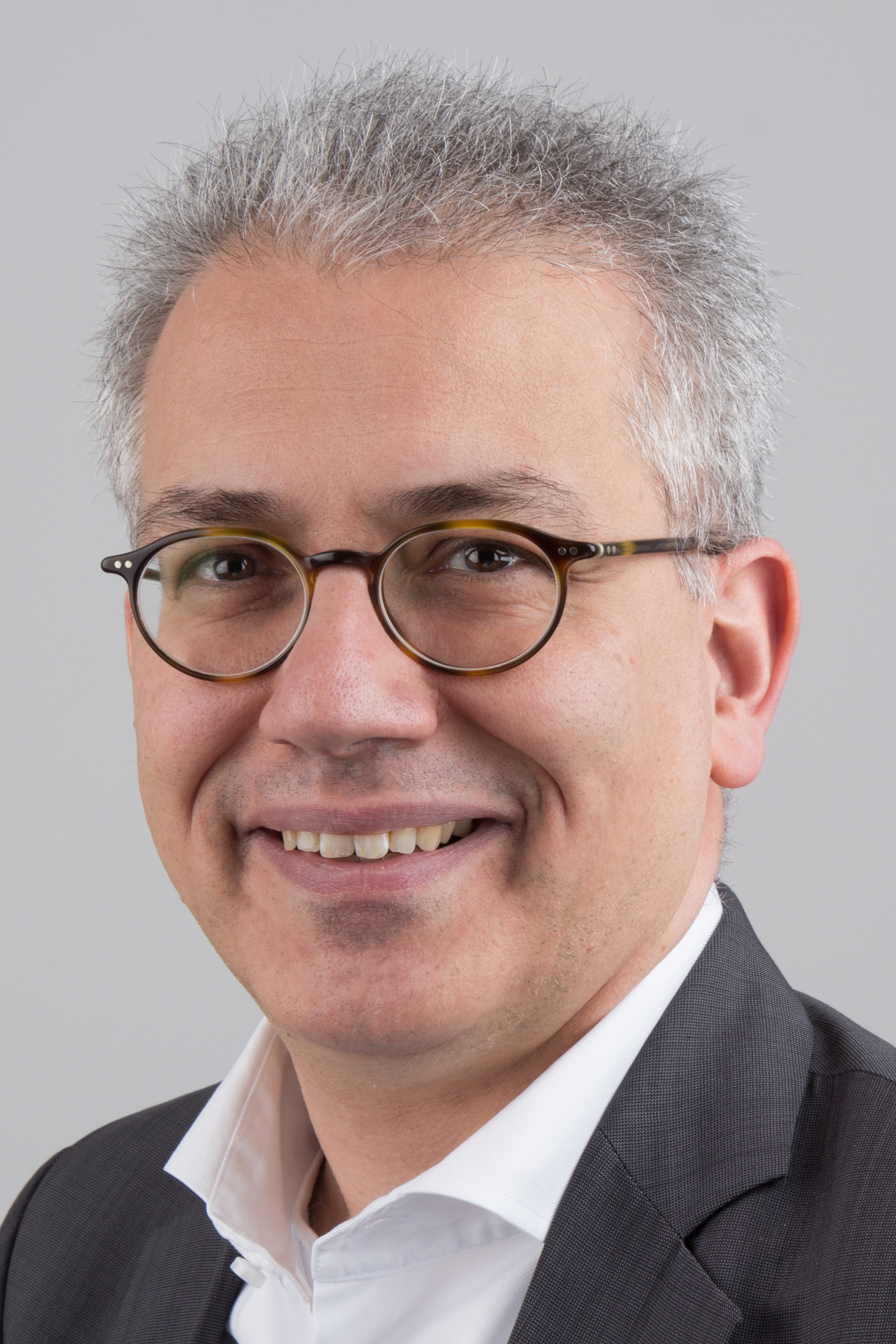

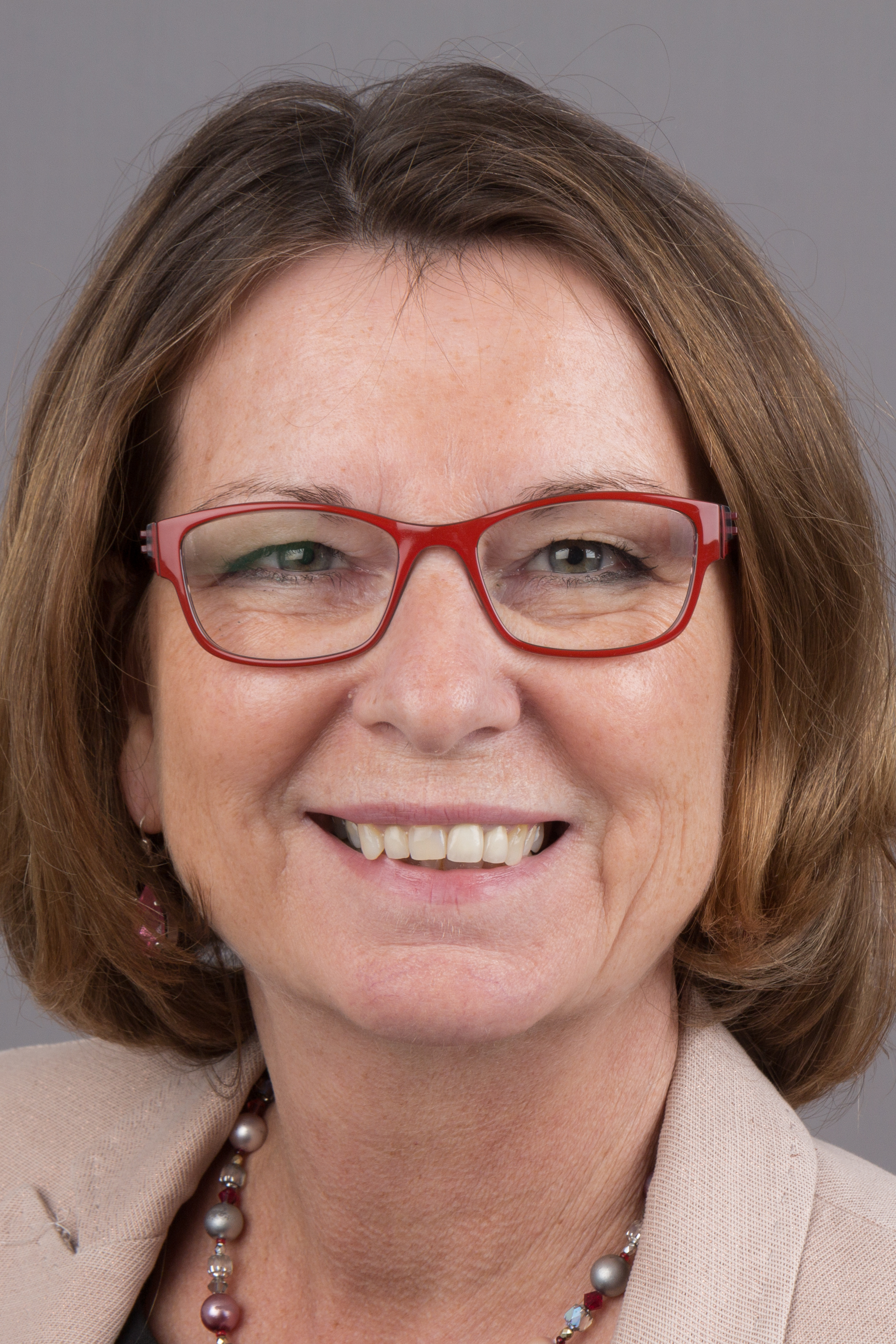

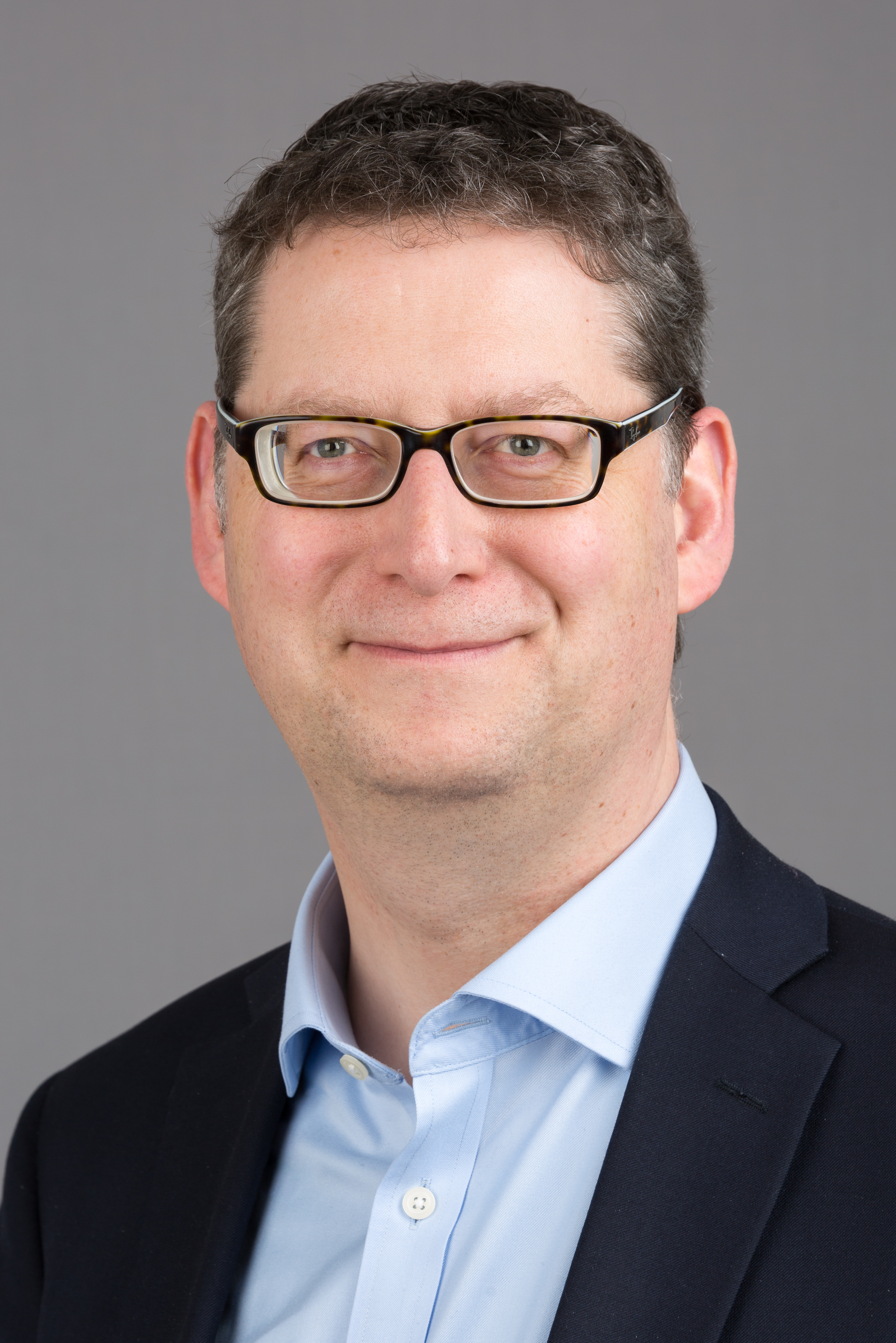

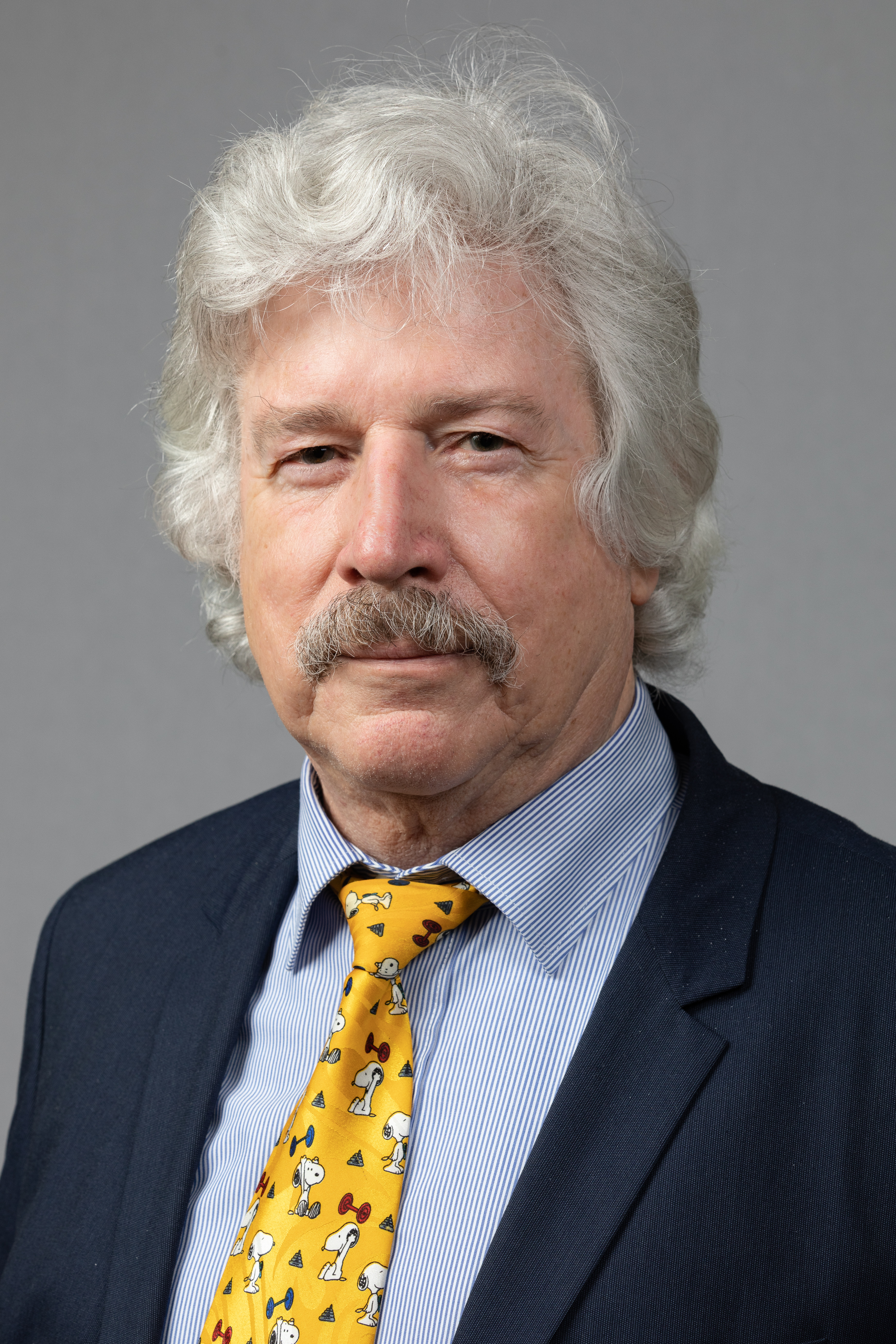

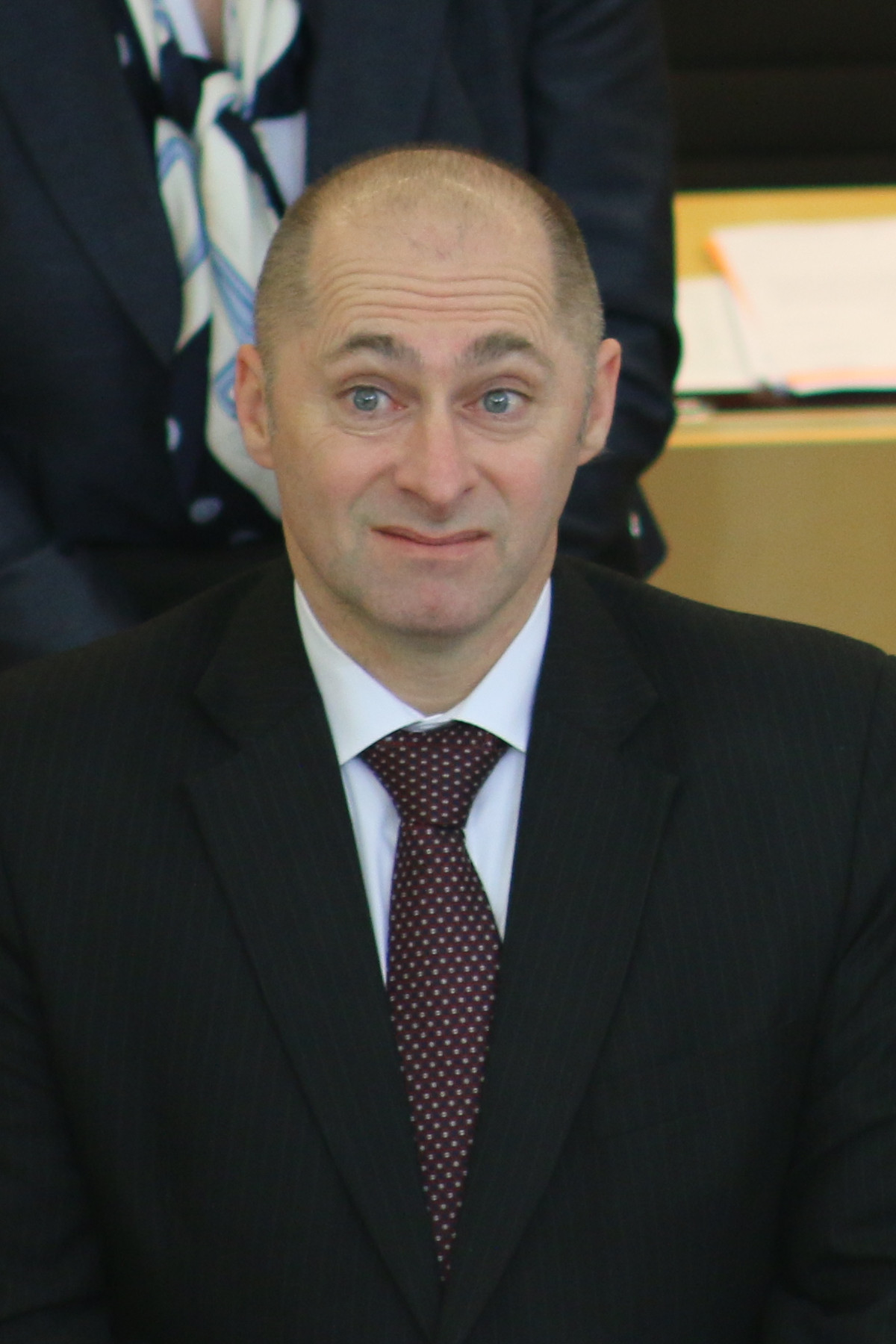

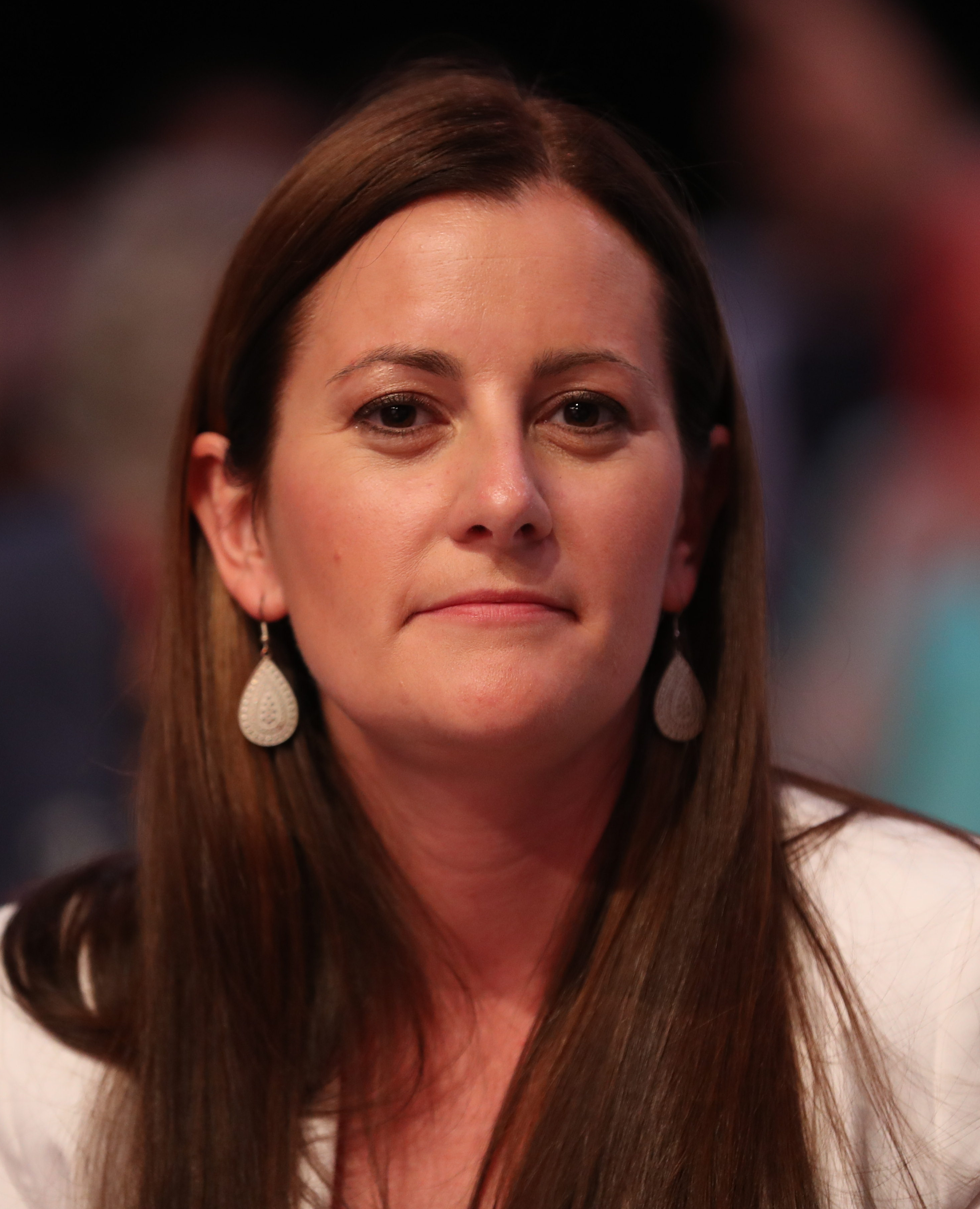

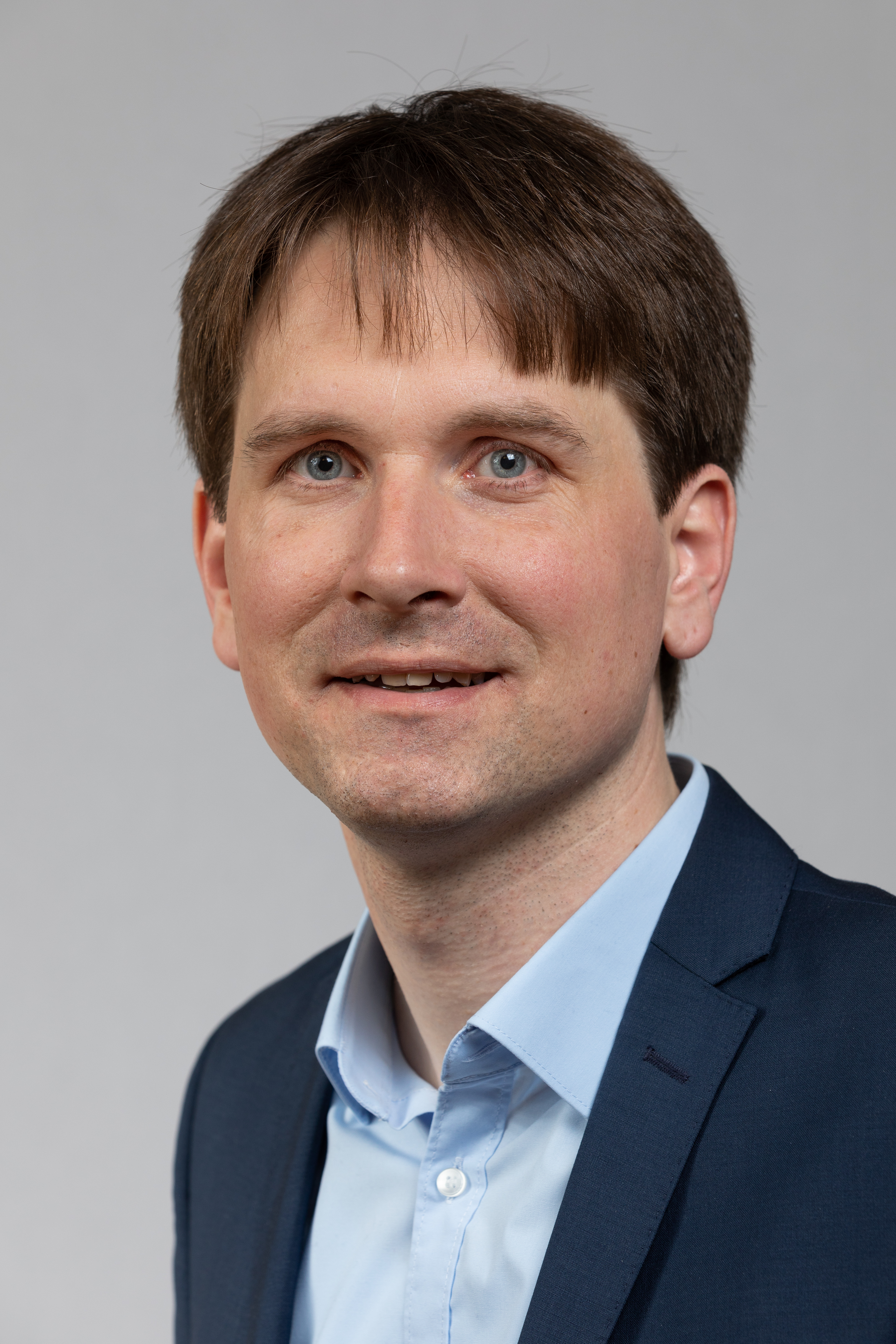
	First party	Second party	Third party
Leader	Volker Bouffier	Tarek Al-Wazir; Priska Hinz	Thorsten Schäfer-Gümbel
Party	CDU	Greens	SPD
Last election	47 seats, 38.3%	14 seats, 11.1%	37 seats, 30.7%
Seats won	40	29	29
Seat change	▼7	▲15	▼8
Popular vote	776,910	570,512	570,446
Percentage	27.0%	19.8%	19.8%
Swing	▼11.3%	▲8.7%	▼10.9%
	Fourth party	Fifth party	Sixth party
Leader	Rainer Rahn	René Rock	Janine Wissler; Jan Schalauske
Party	AfD	FDP	Left
Last election	0 seats, 4.1%	6 seats, 5.0%	6 seats, 5.2%
Seats won	19	11	9
Seat change	▲19	▲5	▲3
Popular vote	378,692	215,946	181,263
Percentage	13.1%	7.5%	6.3%
Swing	▲9.0%	▲2.5%	▲1.1%
- Map of the election, showing the winner of each single-member district and the distribution of list seats.
Government before election
Second Bouffier cabinet
CDU–Green
Government after election
Third Bouffier cabinet
CDU–Green

The 2018 Hessian state election was held on 28 October 2018 to elect the members of the Landtag of Hesse. The outgoing government was a coalition of the Christian Democratic Union (CDU) and The Greens led by Minister-President Volker Bouffier.

The election was held two weeks after the 2018 Bavarian state election, which saw the CSU and Social Democratic Party (SPD) suffer major losses, with third parties making major gains. The result in Hesse was largely similar, with the CDU and SPD losing more than 20 percentage points between them, while the Greens and Alternative for Germany (AfD) gained approximately 9 points each. The Free Democratic Party (FDP) and The Left also made gains. Compared to the 2013 election turnout fell by 5.9 points to 67.3%.

Despite suffering the worst losses of any party, the CDU remained the largest party by a comfortable margin. The Greens and SPD each won 29 seats and 19.8% of the vote; the Greens moved into second place by an extremely narrow margin of just 66 votes. The AfD, which failed to win seats in 2013, won 13.1% and 19 seats. By entering the Landtag in Hesse, it became the only third party present in all sixteen state parliaments.

The election was influenced by the poor condition of the federal government in the aftermath of the "asylum quarrel" in June/July and the crisis around Hans-Georg Maaßen in September. One day after the election, federal Chancellor Angela Merkel announced that she would not seek re-election as CDU leader at the party convention in early December, nor seek her party's nomination as Chancellor candidate for the next federal election.

The incumbent CDU–Green government was returned with a slim majority of one seat, and was subsequently renewed.

== Background ==
The incumbent Hesse government coalition consisted of CDU and the Greens.

The regional election for Hesse, along with the Bavarian state election held just two weeks before, was widely seen as a test for the ruling CDU/CSU and SPD coalition of Angela Merkel's fourth federal cabinet.

== Parties ==
The table below lists parties represented in the previous Landtag of Hesse.

Name		Ideology	Leader(s)	2013 result	
Name		Ideology	Leader(s)	Votes (%)	Seats
CDU	Christian Democratic Union of Germany; Christlich Demokratische Union Deutschlands	Christian democracy	Volker Bouffier	38.3%	47 / 110
SPD	Social Democratic Party of Germany; Sozialdemokratische Partei Deutschlands	Social democracy	Thorsten Schäfer-Gümbel	30.7%	37 / 110
Grüne	Alliance 90/The Greens; Bündnis 90/Die Grünen	Green politics	Tarek Al-Wazir; Priska Hinz	11.1%	14 / 110
Linke	The Left; Die Linke	Democratic socialism	Janine Wissler; Jan Schalauske	5.2%	6 / 110
FDP	Free Democratic Party; Freie Demokratische Partei	Classical liberalism	René Rock	5.0%	6 / 110

== Opinion polling ==
View source data.

Polling firm	Fieldwork date	Sample size	CDU	SPD	Grüne	Linke	FDP	AfD	Others	Lead
2018 state election	28 Oct 2018	–	27.0	19.8	19.8	6.3	7.5	13.1	6.5	7.2
Forschungsgruppe Wahlen	24–25 Oct 2018	1,025	28	20	20	8	8	12	4	8
Civey	18–24 Oct 2018	4,467	27.0	22.0	18.5	7.5	8.0	13.0	4.0	5.0
INSA	18–22 Oct 2018	1,004	26	21	21	8	7	13	4	5
Infratest dimap	16–17 Oct 2018	1,002	26	21	20	8	9	12	4	5
Forschungsgruppe Wahlen	15–17 Oct 2018	1,035	26	20	22	8	8	12	4	4
Civey	2–12 Oct 2018	4,549	28.5	24.9	18.2	7.5	5.6	11.8	3.5	3.6
Forschungsgruppe Wahlen	24 Sep–1 Oct 2018	1,038	29	23	18	8	6	13	3	6
Civey	19–26 Sep 2018	4,509	28.6	23.0	15.8	8.8	7.6	12.4	3.8	5.6
Forschungsgruppe Wahlen	17–19 Sep 2018	1,039	32	25	15	8	6	11	3	7
Infratest dimap	13–19 Sep 2018	1,000	28	23	17	8	7	14	3	5
INSA	3–6 Sep 2018	1,039	29	24	14	8	7	14	4	5
Civey	14–30 Aug 2018	4,532	31.1	23.9	13.4	7.9	7.1	12.7	3.9	7.2
Infratest dimap	14–19 Jun 2018	1,003	31	22	14	7	7	15	4	9
Forschungsgruppe Wahlen	4–11 Jun 2018	1,049	31	25	13	8	8	11	4	6
INSA	9–16 May 2018	1,067	33	24	13	8	7	11	4	9
Forschungsgruppe Wahlen	19–21 Mar 2018	1,011	31	26	13	8	7	10	5	5
Allensbach	19 Dec 2017–31 Jan 2018	760	31	26	12	7	9	11	?	5
Forsa	8–22 Feb 2018	1,035	33	23	14	7	8	10	5	10
Infratest dimap	9–16 Jan 2018	1,006	31	25	13	8	8	12	3	6
2017 federal election	24 Sep 2017	–	30.9	23.5	9.7	8.1	11.5	11.9	4.4	7.3
Infratest dimap	5–10 Jan 2017	1,003	32	24	14	8	6	14	2	8
dimap	15–22 Aug 2016	1,000	36	27	13	6	4	9	5	9
Forsa	1–8 Apr 2016	1,004	33	27	11	6	7	10	6	6
Infratest dimap	12–16 Jan 2016	1,000	34	26	11	8	5	12	4	8
Forsa	17–26 Aug 2015	1,009	38	28	13	5	5	4	7	14
dimap	6–13 Jul 2015	1,003	41	27	14	6	6	2	4	14
dimap	10–14 Dec 2014	1,000	38	27	16	7	2	5	5	11
2014 European election	25 May 2014	–	30.6	30.3	12.9	5.6	4.1	9.1	7.3	0.3
Forsa	18–27 Feb 2014	1,002	39	27	12	7	5	5	5	12
2013 federal election	22 Sep 2013	–	39.2	28.8	9.9	6.0	5.6	5.6	4.9	10.4
2013 state election	22 Sep 2013	–	38.3	30.7	11.1	5.2	5.0	4.1	5.6	7.6

== Election result ==
Following 2018 Hessian election

Summary of the 28 October 2018 election results for the Landtag of Hesse
Party	Constituency			Party list				Total seats	+/-
Party	Votes	%	Seats	Votes	%	+/-	Seats	Total seats	+/-
Christian Democratic Union	843,068	29.34	40	776,910	26.96	-11.35	0	40	▼7
Alliance 90/The Greens	517,904	18.03	5	570,512	19.80	+8.66	24	29	▲15
Social Democratic Party	670,637	23.34	10	570,446	19.80	-10.93	19	29	▼8
Alternative for Germany	362,210	12.61	0	378,692	13.14	+9.09	19	19	▲19
Free Democratic Party	205,384	7.15	0	215,946	7.49	+2.47	11	11	▲5
The Left	164,535	5.73	0	181,332	6.29	+1.14	9	9	▲3
Free Voters	88,122	3.07	0	85,465	2.97	+1.74	0	0	0
Human Environment Animal Protection Party	471	0.02	0	28,095	0.98	New	0	0	New
Die PARTEI	12,007	0.42	0	18,334	0.64	+0.15	0	0	0
Pirate Party	3,818	0.13	0	11,617	0.40	-1.52	0	0	0
Ecological Democratic Party	3,232	0.11	0	7,539	0.26	+0.13	0	0	0
National Democratic Party	–			6,173	0.21	-0.85	0	0	0
Grey Panthers	–			4,870	0.17	+0.09	0	0	0
Alliance C – Christians for Germany	–			3,789	0.13	New	0	0	New
Party for Health Research	–			3,572	0.12	New	0	0	New
V-Partei^{3}	145	0.01	0	3,553	0.12	New	0	0	New
Basic Income Alliance	–			3,031	0.11	New	0	0	New
Alliance of German Democrats	–			2,971	0.10	New	0	0	New
Party of Humanists	–			2,646	0.09	New	0	0	New
The Violets	373	0.01	0	2,403	0.08	New	0	0	New
Human World	74	0.00	0	1,600	0.06	New	0	0	New
Liberal Conservatives	139	0.00	0	1,340	0.05	New	0	0	New
Solidarity Movement	–			425	0.01	-0.03	0	0	0
Non-partisan Residents	643	0.02	0	–				0	New
Democracy in Motion	168	0.01	0	–				0	New
Anarchist Pogo Party of Germany	94	0.00	0	–				0	0
Ecological Left	46	0.00	0	–				0	0
Total	2,873,070	100.00	55	2,881,261	100.00		82	137	▲27
Invalid	69,776	2.37		61,585	2.09				
Turnout	2,942,846	67.30		2,942,846	67.30	-5.93			
Registered voters	4,372,788			4,372,788					

CDU vote

Green vote

SPD vote

AfD vote

FDP vote

Linke vote

== State government formation ==
Despite heavy losses inflicted on the party, the CDU returned to government after negotiating a coalition agreement with the Greens, the second consecutive such arrangement between the two parties. The two parties formed the narrowest possible majority in the Landtag, occupying 69 seats. As part of the agreement, the Greens increased their representation in the Cabinet, holding four of the eleven portfolios. The returned coalition only became possible after a recount of votes took place several weeks after the election, due to computer glitches which affected some election night results. Following the recount, the state election commissioner announced that compared to the provisional figures, there were no significant shifts in the percentages, and the distribution of seats in the state parliament had not changed.
