= Free Voters =

Political party in Germany

Free Voters Freie Wähler
- Abbreviation: FW
- Chairman: Vacant
- Deputy Chairpersons: Manfred Petry; Gabi Schmidt; Gregor Voht; Engin Eroglu; Denise Wendt
- Federal Managing Director: Arnold Hansen
- Federal Treasurer: Christa Hudyma
- Founded: 1965; 61 years ago (as Bundesverband); 24 January 2009 (as a party)
- Headquarters: Mühlenstraße 13, Ganderkesee, Germany
- Youth wing: Young Free Voters
- Membership (2020): 6,225
- Ideology: Conservatism; Regionalism
- Political position: Centre to centre-right
- European affiliation: European Democratic Party
- European Parliament group: Renew Europe
- Colours: Orange; Azure
- Bundestag: 0 / 630
- Bundesrat: 2 / 69
- European Parliament: 3 / 96
- State parliaments: 37 / 1,875

Website
- freiewaehler.eu
- Politics of Germany; Political parties; Elections; A: The party has also been labelled as liberal conservative and ultra-conservative.

Free Voters (German: Freie Wähler, FW) is a political party in Germany. It originates as an umbrella organisation of several Free Voters Associations (Freie Wählergemeinschaften), associations of people which participate in an election without having the status of a registered party. These associations are usually locally-organised groups of voters in the form of a registered association (eV). In most cases, Free Voters campaign only at local government level, standing for city councils and for mayoralties. Free Voters tend to achieve their most successful electoral results in rural areas of southern Germany, appealing most to conservative voters who prefer local decisions to party politics. Free Voter groups are active in all of the states of Germany, except for Brandenburg, where the Brandenburg United Civic Movements/Free Voters is an equivalent party distinct from the Free Voters in cooperation with the Free Voters.

== History ==
In the 2003 Bavaria state election, the FW association received 4.0% of the vote (411,306 votes), barely missing the 5% threshold required to enter the state Landtag.

In the 2008 Bavaria state election, the FW association received 10.2% of the vote and gained their first 20 seats in the Landtag of Bavaria. FW may have been helped by the presence in its list of Gabriele Pauli, a former member of the Christian Social Union of Bavaria (CSU). The party also reached its best performance yet in raw votes, receiving 1,085,896 votes.

In the 2009 federal election, the Free Voters received 0.03% of the national vote (11,243 votes in total).

At the executive elections of the Federal Association in Berlin on 27 March 2010 Hubert Aiwanger was elected federal chairman of the Free Voters.

In the 2013 Bavarian state election, the Free Voters repeated their success, gaining 19 seats albeit at 9.0% of the vote. In the 2013 federal election, the Free Voters received 1.0% of the national vote (423,977 votes in total).

In the 2014 European parliament elections in Germany, the Free Voters list received 1.46% of the national vote and returned a single MEP, Ulrike Müller, who sits with the ALDE Group. The federal Free Voters association joined the European Democratic Party in October 2015.

In June 2017, Arne Gericke, who sits with European Parliament's European Conservatives and Reformists group and was elected in 2014 on the Family Party of Germany list, joined the federal association. Gericke left it 15 months afterward for Alliance C – Christians for Germany.

In the 2017 federal election, the Free Voters received 1.0% of the national vote (463,292 votes in total).

In the 2018 Bavarian state election, the Free Voters won a record 27 seats with 11.6% of the vote, entering into a coalition government as junior partner to the CSU, forming the first black–orange coalition.

Following the 2019 European Parliament election in Germany, the Free Voters sit in the Renew Europe group in the European Parliament with two MEPs. In the European Committee of the Regions, the Free Voters sit in the Renew Europe CoR group with one alternate member for the 2025–2030 mandate.

In the 2021 Rhineland-Palatinate state election, the Free Voters entered the Landtag of Rhineland-Palatinate for the first time, amassing 5.4% of the vote and six seats.

In the 2021 federal election, the Free Voters received 2.4% of the national vote (1,125,667 votes in total), winning roughly half of those votes from the state of Bavaria, where it received 7.5% (566,880 votes) of the vote and came 5th. The Free Voters hence became the most voted for party that failed to receive Bundestag seats.

In the 2023 Bavarian state election, the Free Voters remained the second largest party and continued its coalition with the CSU, increasing its vote share to 15.8% of the vote and 37 seats.

In the 2024 European Parliament election in Germany, the Free Voters won 2.7% of the vote and three seats, electing Christine Singer, Joachim Streit and Engin Eroglu to the European Parliament.

In the 2024 Saxony state election, the Free Voters entered the Landtag of Saxony for the first time. Despite failing to reach the 5% threshold with only 2.3% of the vote, the party won a direct mandate in the Leipzig Land III constituency, electing Matthias Berger to the Landtag.

In the 2025 federal election, the Free Voters would fall to 1.55% of the vote, failing to clear 5% in Bavaria.

In the 2026 Rhineland-Palatinate state election, the Free Voters failed to reach the 5% threshold and lost all their seats in the Landtag of Rhineland-Palatinate.

Chairman of the Free Voters Hubert Aiwanger was found dead on November 4 2026.

== Ideology, platform and policies ==
The Free Voters are a conservative, and centre to centre-right party, supporting devolving more power to the local level. As of 2019, the party was in opposition to the European Union's financial policies. In 2024, the party was described by Euractiv as including both liberals and conservatives.

Ideologically, on the political spectrum, it has been described by some sources as being between the Free Democratic Party and the Party of Bible-abiding Christians (now merged into Alliance C - Christians for Germany), and by others as between the Christian Social Union and the Alternative for Germany (AfD). Europe Elects has described it as centrist. Politico has described the party as conservative and right-wing, noting the similarities between their rhetoric and the statements of the AfD (such as opposition to mandatory vaccination and other COVID issues).

The Free Voters believe that local self-government should be strengthened, and demands that the European Committee of the Regions should be given a permanent position in the EU Parliament. Furthermore, the party supports broader online access to official information for voters to make more informed decisions.

On the European Union, the Free Voters oppose the accession of Turkey, while supporting the Union's enlargement by including more Western Balkan states into the Union. MEP Joachim Streit has campaigned for the accession of Canada into the union. The party supports Ukraine in the Russian invasion of Ukraine and believes that Ukraine should have its full, pre-war territory restored. The party also supports recognizing Taiwan as an independent nation.

The party calls for the introduction of referendums on European policy issues, a strengthening of the European Parliament, and the limitation of EU responsibilities to core issues such as promoting the internal market and migration and security policy. Furthermore, the party supports the creation of a European army.

The Free Voters believe in immediate action toward organized crime, and support the "maximum use of the penal framework". They support more power to the police and judiciary system.

The Free Voters support an immigration policy based on the Canadian model. They demand a limit on family reunification for asylum seekers and want to create return assistance. They push for stricter border protection for the EU, including asylum procedures, which they believe should primarily take place at the EU's external borders.

The Free Voters support laws that ensure age-appropriate use of the internet and media and promote the expansion of addiction and violence prevention, and want to expand intergenerational care networks.

== State associations ==
- Free Voters of Bavaria
- Free Voters of Saxony

== Election results ==
=== Federal parliament (Bundestag) ===
Election	Leader	Constituency		Party list		Seats	+/–	Government
Election	Leader	Votes	%	Votes	%	Seats	+/–	Government
2009	Manfred Ehlert			11,243	0.0 (#22)	0 / 622	New	Extra-parliamentary
2013	Hubert Aiwanger	431,640	1.0 (#10)	423,977	1.0 (#10)	0 / 631	0	Extra-parliamentary
2017	Hubert Aiwanger	589,056	1.3 (#8)	463,292	1.0 (#8)	0 / 709	0	Extra-parliamentary
2021	Hubert Aiwanger	1,334,093	2.9 (#8)	1,127,171	2.4 (#8)	0 / 735	0	Extra-parliamentary
2025	Hubert Aiwanger	1,254,488	2.5 (#8)	769,170	1.6 (#9)	0 / 630	0	Extra-parliamentary

=== State parliaments (Länder) ===
In light orange are the regions where FW is represented in the state parliament, in dark orange are the regions where FW is in the state government. (2024)

The Free Voters do not contest state elections in Brandenburg due to the close cooperation with the BVB/Free Voters, who only compete in the state elections in Brandenburg.

State parliament	Election	Votes	%	Seats	+/–	Status
Baden-Württemberg	2026	102,687	1.9 (#7)	0 / 157	0	No seats
Bavaria	2023	2,163,849	15.8 (#2)	37 / 203	▲10	CSU-FW
Berlin	2023	3,923	0.3 (#16)	0 / 159	0	No seats
Hamburg	2025	12,213	0.3 (#12)	0 / 121	0	No seats
Hesse	2023	98,283	3.5 (#6)	0 / 133	0	No seats
Lower Saxony	2022	30,457	0.8 (#10)	0 / 146	0	No seats
Mecklenburg-Vorpommern	2021	10,075	1.1 (#9)	0 / 79	0	No seats
North Rhine-Westphalia	2022	49,985	0.7 (#10)	0 / 195	0	No seats
Rhineland-Palatinate	2026	85,081	4.2 (#6)	0 / 105	▼6	No seats
Saarland	2022	7,636	1.7 (#8)	0 / 51	0	No seats
Saxony	2024	53,027	2.3 (#7)	1 / 120	▲1	Opposition
Saxony-Anhalt	2026	15,430	1.1 (#8)	0 / 97	0	No seats
Schleswig-Holstein	2022	8,190	0.6 (#11)	0 / 69	0	No seats
Thuringia	2024	15,385	1.3 (#7)	0 / 90	0	No seats

=== European Parliament ===
Free Voters support in the 2024 European Parliament election in Germany

Election	List leader	Votes	%	Seats	+/–	EP Group
2009	Gabriele Pauli	442,579	1.68 (#7)	0 / 99	New	–
2014	Ulrike Müller	428,800	1.46 (#8)	1 / 96	▲1	ALDE
2019	Ulrike Müller	806,703	2.16 (#9)	2 / 96	▲1	RE
2024	Christine Singer	1,062,132	2.67 (#9)	3 / 96	▲1	RE

=== Results timeline ===
Year	(Germany) DE	(European Union) EU	(Baden-Württemberg) BW	(Bavaria) BY	(Berlin) BE	(Bremen (state)) HB	(Hamburg) HH	(Hesse) HE	(Lower Saxony) NI	(Mecklenburg-Vorpommern) MV	(North Rhine-Westphalia) NW	(Rhineland-Palatinate) RP	(Saarland) SL	(Saxony) SN	(Saxony-Anhalt) ST	(Schleswig-Holstein) SH	(Thuringia) TH
2001	N/A	N/A	N/A	N/A	N/A	N/A	N/A	N/A	N/A	N/A	N/A	▲2.5	N/A	N/A	N/A	N/A	N/A
2002	N/A	N/A	N/A	N/A	N/A	N/A	N/A	N/A	N/A	N/A	N/A	▲2.5	N/A	N/A	N/A	N/A	N/A
2003	N/A	N/A	N/A	▲4.0	N/A	N/A	N/A	N/A	N/A	N/A	N/A	▲2.5	N/A	N/A	N/A	N/A	N/A
2004	N/A	N/A	N/A	▲4.0	N/A	N/A	N/A	N/A	N/A	N/A	N/A	▲2.5	N/A	N/A	N/A	N/A	▲2.6
2005	N/A	N/A	N/A	▲4.0	N/A	N/A	N/A	N/A	N/A	N/A	N/A	▲2.5	N/A	N/A	N/A	N/A	▲2.6
2006	N/A	N/A	N/A	▲4.0	N/A	N/A	N/A	N/A	N/A	N/A	N/A	▼1.6	N/A	N/A	N/A	N/A	▲2.6
2007	N/A	N/A	N/A	▲4.0	N/A	N/A	N/A	N/A	N/A	N/A	N/A	▼1.6	N/A	N/A	N/A	N/A	▲2.6
2008	N/A	N/A	N/A	▲10.2	N/A	N/A	N/A	▲0.8	▲0.5	N/A	N/A	▼1.6	N/A	N/A	N/A	N/A	▲2.6
2009	▲0.03	▲1.6	N/A	▲10.2	N/A	N/A	N/A	▲1.6	▲0.5	N/A	N/A	▼1.6	N/A	N/A	N/A	▲1.0	**▲3.9**
2010	▲0.03	▲1.6	N/A	▲10.2	N/A	N/A	N/A	▲1.6	▲0.5	N/A	▲0.1	▼1.6	N/A	N/A	N/A	▲1.0	**▲3.9**
2011	▲0.03	▲1.6	N/A	▲10.2	▲0.0	▲0.2	**▲0.7**	▲1.6	▲0.5	▲1.1	▲0.1	▲2.3	N/A	N/A	▲2.8	▲1.0	**▲3.9**
2012	▲0.03	▲1.6	N/A	▲10.2	▲0.0	▲0.2	**▲0.7**	▲1.6	▲0.5	▲1.1	▲0.2	▲2.3	▲0.9	N/A	▲2.8	**▼0.6**	**▲3.9**
2013	▲0.9	▲1.6	N/A	▼9.0	▲0.0	▲0.2	**▲0.7**	▼1.2	▲0.6	▲1.1	▲0.2	▲2.3	▲0.9	N/A	▲2.8	**▼0.6**	**▲3.9**
2014	▲0.9	▼1.5	N/A	▼9.0	▲0.0	▲0.2	**▲0.7**	▼1.2	▲0.6	▲1.1	▲0.2	▲2.3	▲0.9	▲1.6	▲2.8	**▼0.6**	▼1.7
2015	▲0.9	▼1.5	N/A	▼9.0	▲0.0	▼ N/A	▼ N/A	▼1.2	▲0.6	▲1.1	▲0.2	▲2.3	▲0.9	▲1.6	▲2.8	**▼0.6**	▼1.7
2016	▲0.9	▼1.5	▲0.1	▼9.0	▼ N/A	▼ N/A	▼ N/A	▼1.2	▲0.6	▼0.5	▲0.2	▼2.2	▲0.9	▲1.6	▼2.2	**▼0.6**	▼1.7
2017	▲1.0	▼1.5	▲0.1	▼9.0	▼ N/A	▼ N/A	▼ N/A	▼1.2	▼0.4	▼0.5	▲0.3	▼2.2	▼0.4	▲1.6	▼2.2	**0.6**	▼1.7
2018	▲1.0	▼1.5	▲0.1	▲11.6	▼ N/A	▼ N/A	▼ N/A	▲3.0	▼0.4	▼0.5	▲0.3	▼2.2	▼0.4	▲1.6	▼2.2	**0.6**	▼1.7
2019	▲1.0	▲2.2	▲0.1		▼ N/A	**▲1.0**	▼ N/A	▲3.0	▼0.4	▼0.5	▲0.3	▼2.2	▼0.4	**▲3.4**	▼2.2	**0.6**	▼ N/A
2020	▲1.0	▲2.2	▲0.1		▼ N/A	**▲1.0**	▲0.6	▲3.0	▼0.4	▼0.5	▲0.3	▼2.2	▼0.4	**▲3.4**	▼2.2	**0.6**	▼ N/A
2021	▲**2.4**	▲2.2	**▲3.0**		**▲0.8**	**▲1.0**	▲0.6	▲3.0	▼0.4	**▲1.1**	▲0.3	**▲5.4**	▼0.4	**▲3.4**	**▲3.1**	**0.6**	▼ N/A
2022	▲**2.4**	▲2.2	**▲3.0**		**▲0.8**	**▲1.0**	▲0.6	▲3.0	**▲0.8**	**▲1.1**	**▲0.7**	**▲5.4**	**▲1.7**	**▲3.4**	**▲3.1**	**0.6**	▼ N/A
2023	▲**2.4**	▲2.2	**▲3.0**	**▲15.8**	▼0.2	▼ N/A	▲0.6	**▲3.5**	**▲0.8**	**▲1.1**	**▲0.7**	**▲5.4**	**▲1.7**	**▲3.4**	**▲3.1**	**0.6**	▼ N/A
2024	▲**2.4**	▲**2.6**	**▲3.0**		▼0.2	▼ N/A	▲0.6	**▲3.5**	**▲0.8**	**▲1.1**	**▲0.7**	**▲5.4**	**▲1.7**	▼2.3	**▲3.1**	**0.6**	▲2.8
2025	▼1.5	▲**2.6**	**▲3.0**		▼0.2	▼ N/A	▼0.3	**▲3.5**	**▲0.8**	**▲1.1**	**▲0.7**	**▲5.4**	**▲1.7**	▼2.3	**▲3.1**	**0.6**	▲2.8
2026	▼1.5	▲**2.6**	▼1.9		▼ N/A	▼ N/A	▼0.3	**▲3.5**	**▲0.8**	▼0.3	**▲0.7**	▼4.2	**▲1.7**	▼2.3	▼1.1	**0.6**	▲2.8
Year	(Germany) DE	(European Union) EU	(Baden-Württemberg) BW	(Bavaria) BY	(Berlin) BE	(Bremen (state)) HB	(Hamburg) HH	(Hesse) HE	(Lower Saxony) NI	(Mecklenburg-Vorpommern) MV	(North Rhine-Westphalia) NW	(Rhineland-Palatinate) RP	(Saarland) SL	(Saxony) SN	(Saxony-Anhalt) ST	(Schleswig-Holstein) SH	(Thuringia) TH
**Bold** indicates best result to date. Present in legislature (in opposition); Junior coalition partner Senior coalition partner
