= 2018 Bavarian state election =

2018 election in the German state of Bavaria

- 14 October 2018

205 seats in the Landtag of Bavaria (including 25 overhang and leveling seats) 103 seats needed for a majority
- Registered: 9,479,428
- Turnout: 6,852,036 (72.3%) ▲8.7%

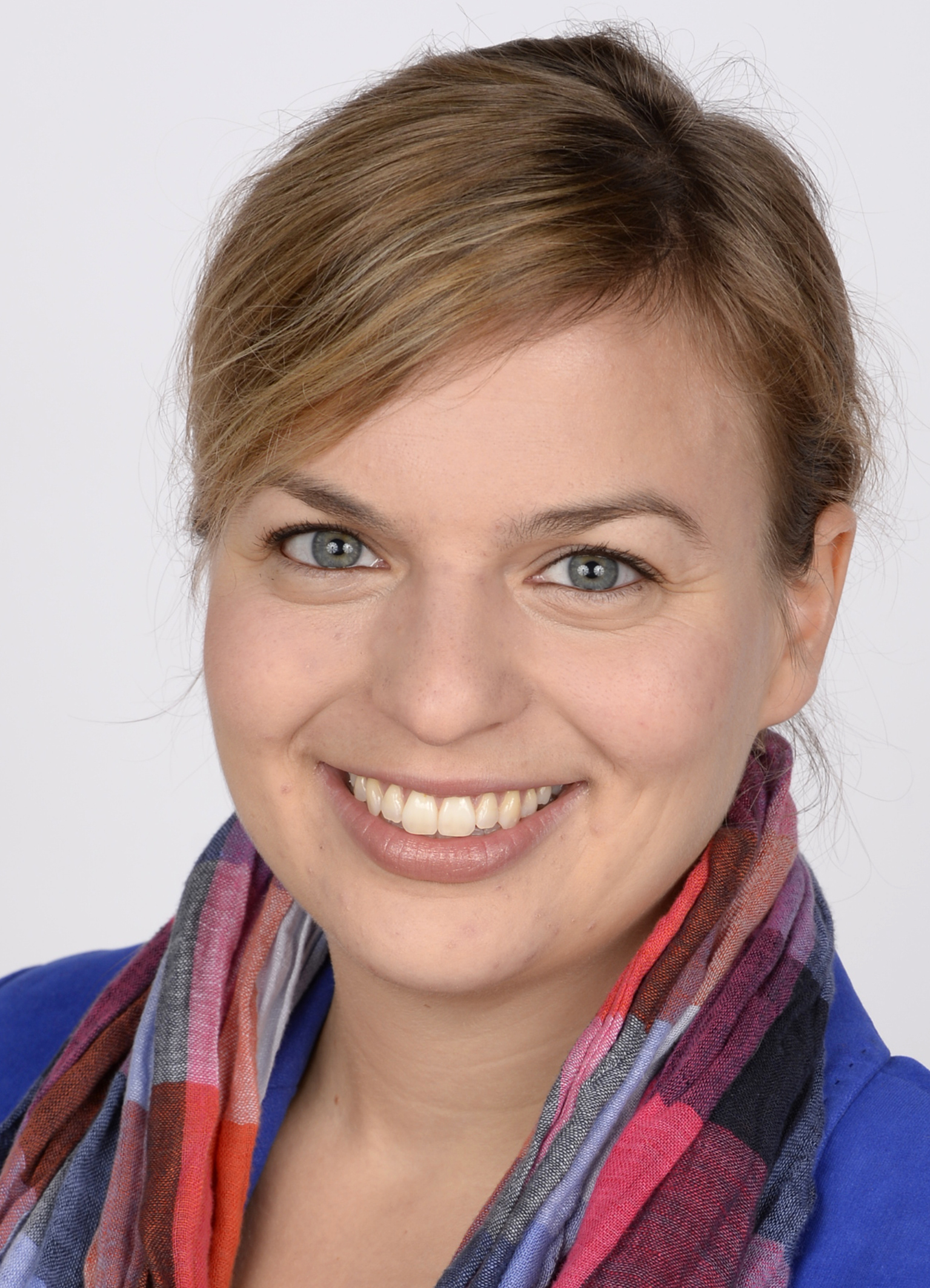

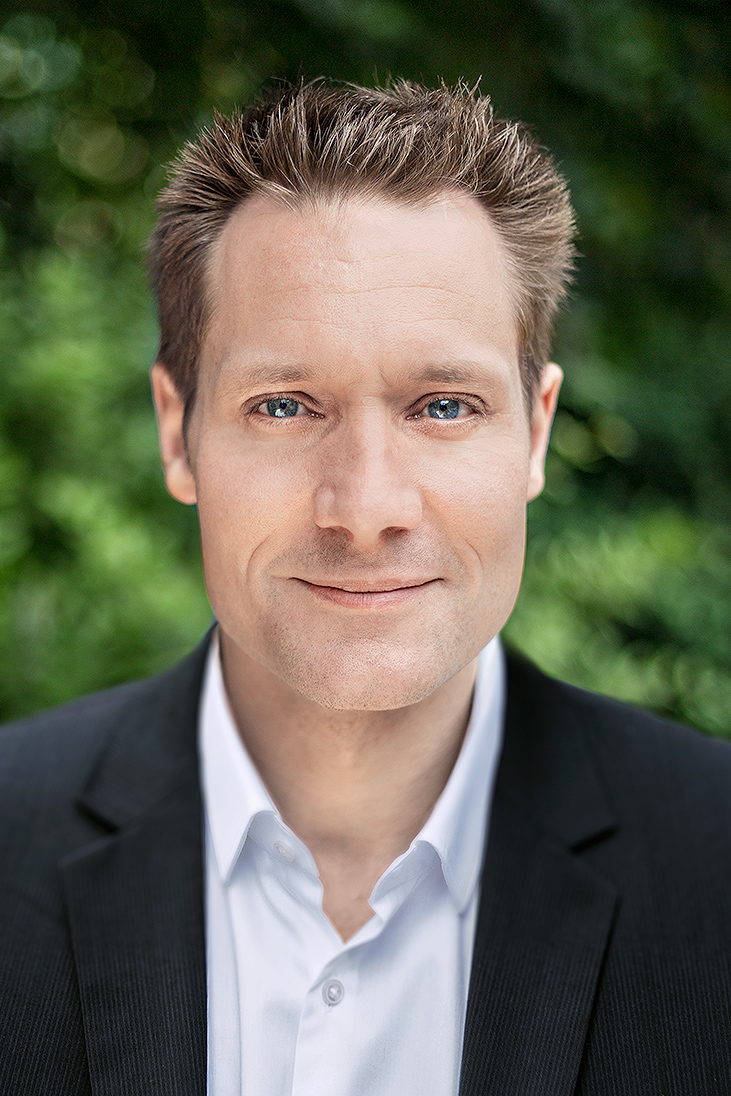

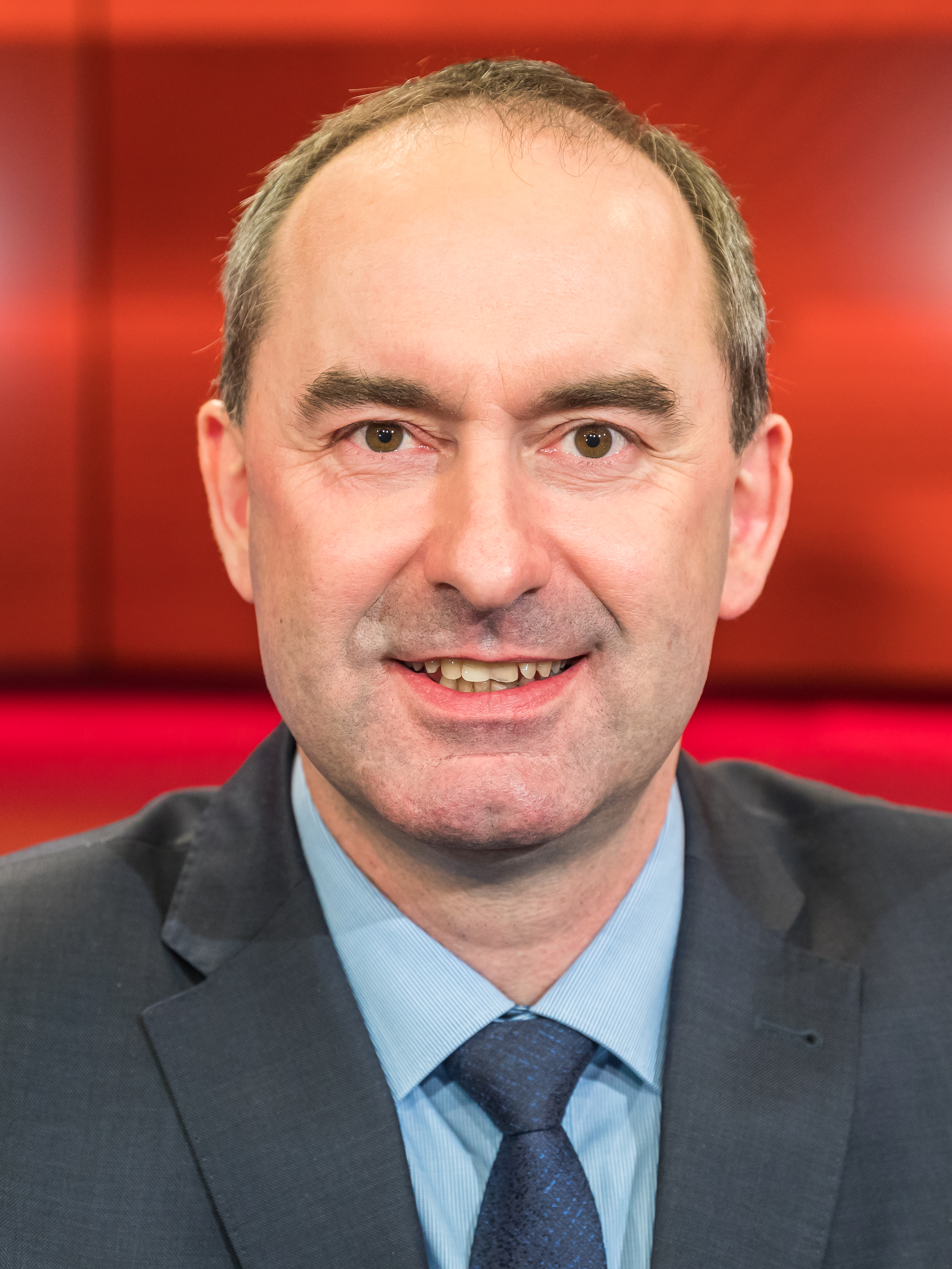

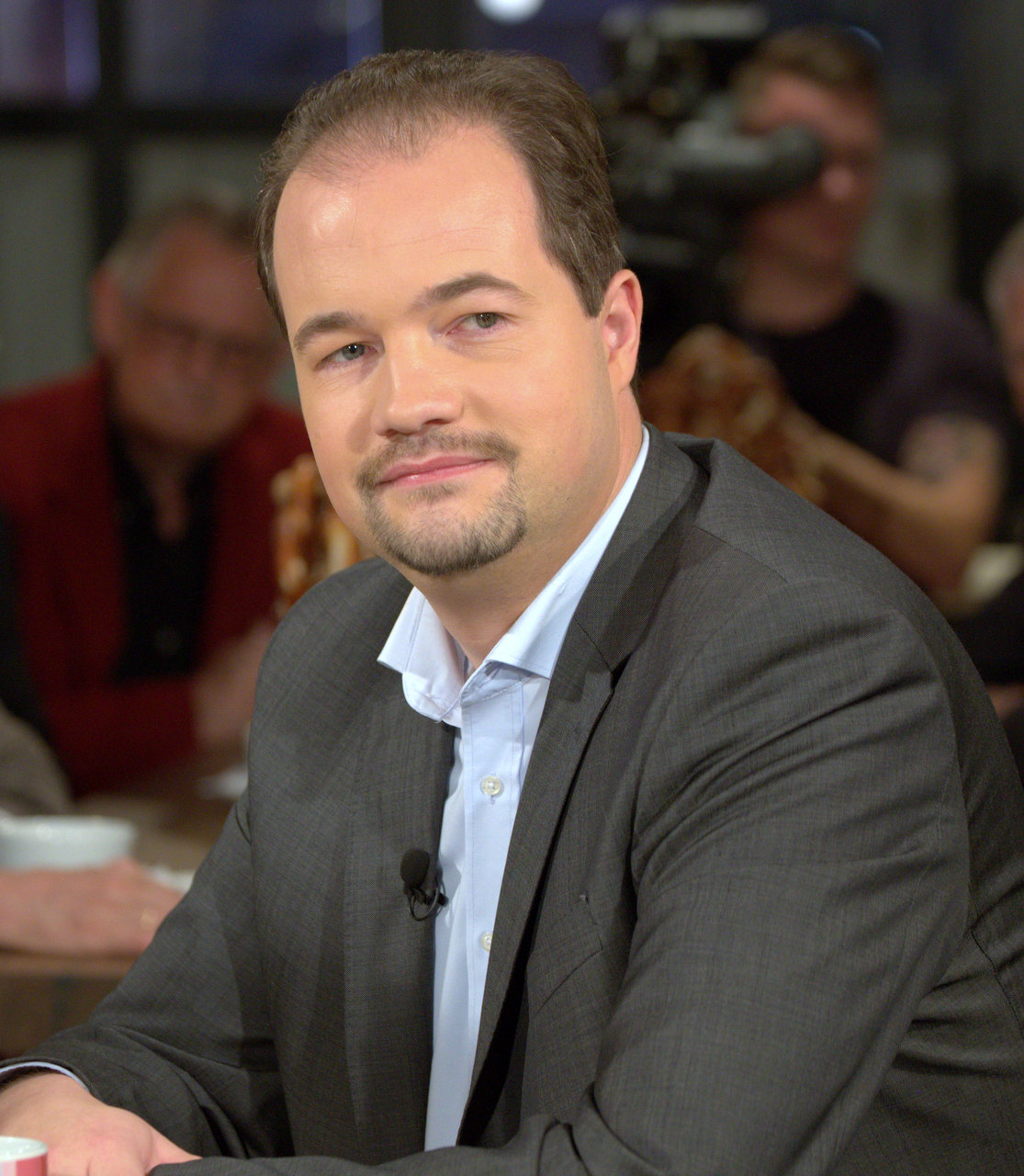

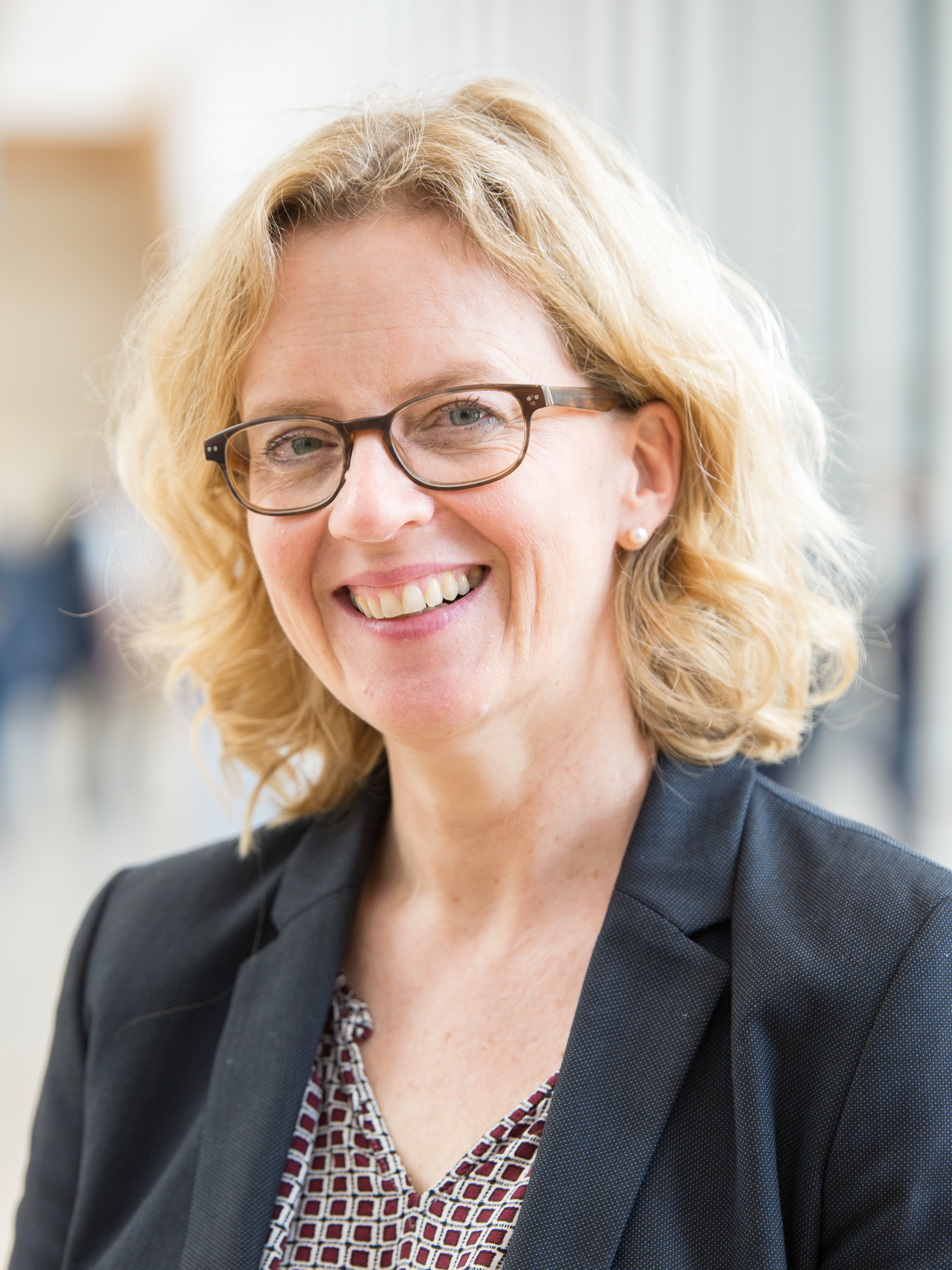

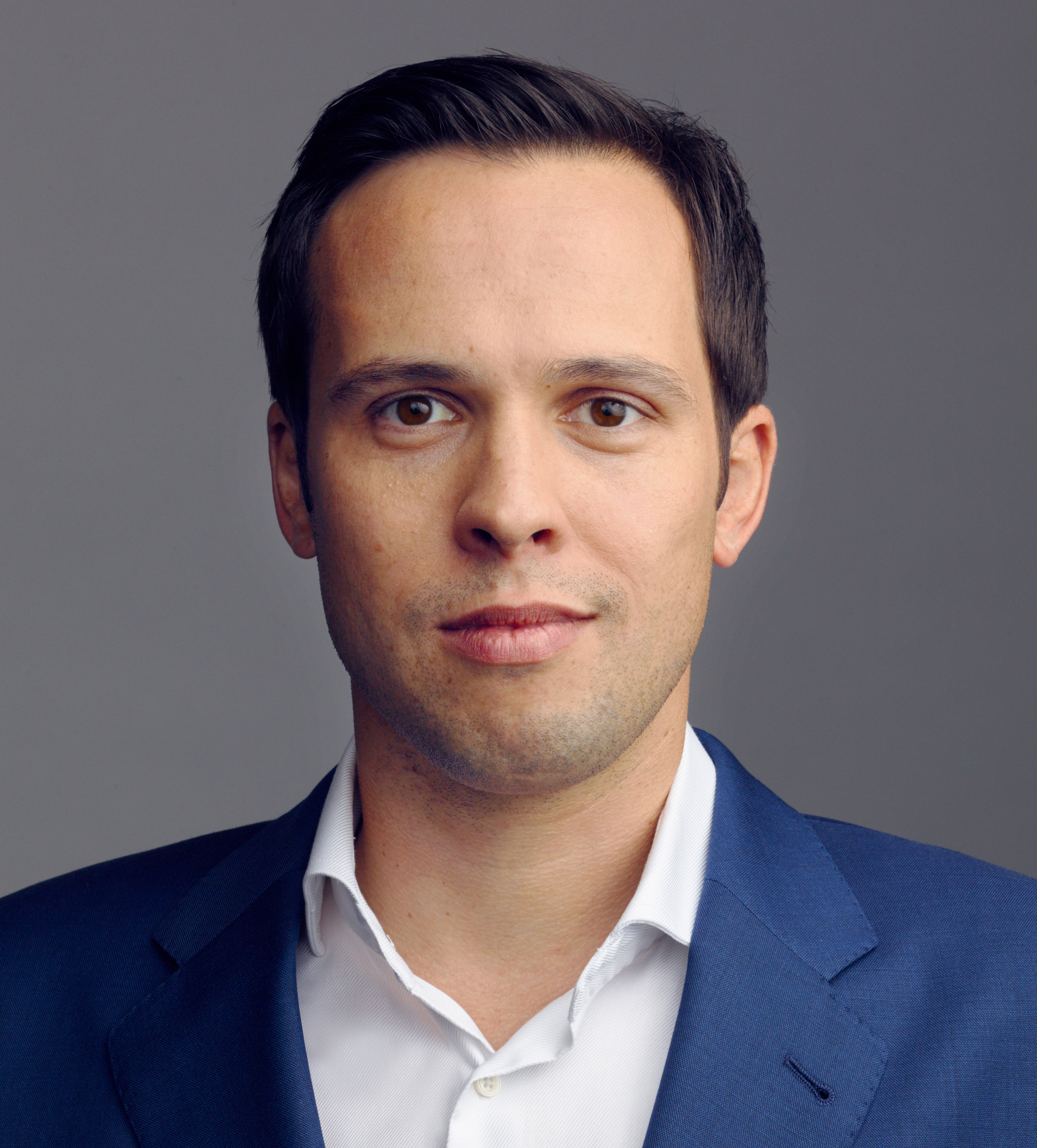
	First party	Second party	Third party
Leader	Markus Söder	Katharina Schulze; Ludwig Hartmann	Hubert Aiwanger
Party	CSU	Greens	FW
Last election	101 seats, 47.7%	18 seats, 8.6%	19 seats, 9.0%
Seats won	85	38	27
Seat change	▼16	▲21	▲8
Popular vote	5,046,081	2,392,356	1,572,792
Percentage	37.2%	17.6%	11.6%
Swing	▼10.5%	▲9.0%	▲2.6%
	Fourth party	Fifth party	Sixth party
Leader	Martin Sichert	Natascha Kohnen	Martin Hagen
Party	AfD	SPD	FDP
Last election	Did not contest	42 seats, 20.6%	0 seats, 3.3%
Seats won	22	22	11
Seat change	▲22	▼20	▲11
Popular vote	1,388,622	1,309,078	690,499
Percentage	10.2%	9.7%	5.1%
Swing	New party	▼10.9%	▲1.8%
- Map of the election, showing the winner of each single-member district and the distribution of list seats in the constituencies.
Government before election
First Söder cabinet
CSU
Government after election
Second Söder cabinet
CSU–FW

The 2018 Bavarian state election took place on 14 October 2018 to elect the 180 members of the 18th Landtag of Bavaria. The outgoing government was a majority of the Christian Social Union in Bavaria (CSU), led by Minister President Markus Söder.

The CSU recorded its worst result since 1950 with 37% of votes, a decline of over ten percentage points, although it remained by far the largest party in the Landtag. The SPD, which had previously been the second largest party, fell to fifth place with just 10%. The Greens gained 9 points and emerged as the second strongest party with 17.5%. The Free Voters of Bavaria (FW) gained 2.6 points and finished third with 11.6% of the total vote. The Alternative for Germany (AfD), which ran in Bavaria for the first time, placed fourth with 10%. The Free Democratic Party (FDP), which failed to enter the Landtag in 2013, narrowly re-entered with 5.1%, becoming the smallest party. Turnout rose to 72%, up 9 points from under 64% in 2013.

The election was influenced by the condition of the federal CDU/CSU–SPD government following two crises in the preceding months: the so-called asylum quarrel in June and July followed by the controversy around Hans-Georg Maaßen in September. CSU leader Horst Seehofer played a major role in both events. Four days before the Bavarian election, federal SPD leader Andrea Nahles criticised Chancellor Angela Merkel, accusing her of a "lack of leadership".

As a result of the election, the CSU lacked a majority and formed a coalition government with the Free Voters.

== Election date and preparation deadlines ==
According to the Bavarian Constitution, the election must be held on a Sunday "at the earliest 59 months, at the latest 62 months" after the preceding state elections which took place on 15 September 2013. This would theoretically allow an election date between 19 August and 11 November 2018, but in practice the elections since 1978 have always taken place between mid-September and mid-October. The Bavarian state government proposed 14 October 2018 as the election date on 9 January 2018 and officially set it on 20 February after hearing the parties to the state parliament.

The deadline for determining the population figures, which are decisive for the distribution of the 180 Landtag mandates among the seven Bavarian administrative districts and a possible new division of the constituencies, was 15 June 2016 (33 months after the election of the previous Landtag). On this basis, the Bavarian Ministry of the Interior had to submit a constituency report to the Landtag until 36 months after the election This was done on 6 September 2016.

Delegates to the internal constituency meetings could be appointed at the earliest 43 months after the preceding election, i.e. since 16 April 2017. The actual district candidates had been eligible since 16 July 2017. The parties and other organised electoral groups which had not been represented continuously in the Bavarian Land Parliament or in the German Bundestag since their last election on the basis of their own election proposals (CDU, CSU, SPD, Free Voters of Bavaria, Alliance 90/The Greens, FDP, Die Linke, AfD) had to notify their intention to participate to the State Election Commissioner by the 90th day before the election, i.e. by 16 July 2018 at the latest. The actual election proposals and any necessary signatures had to be submitted by 2 August 2018.

== Electoral system ==
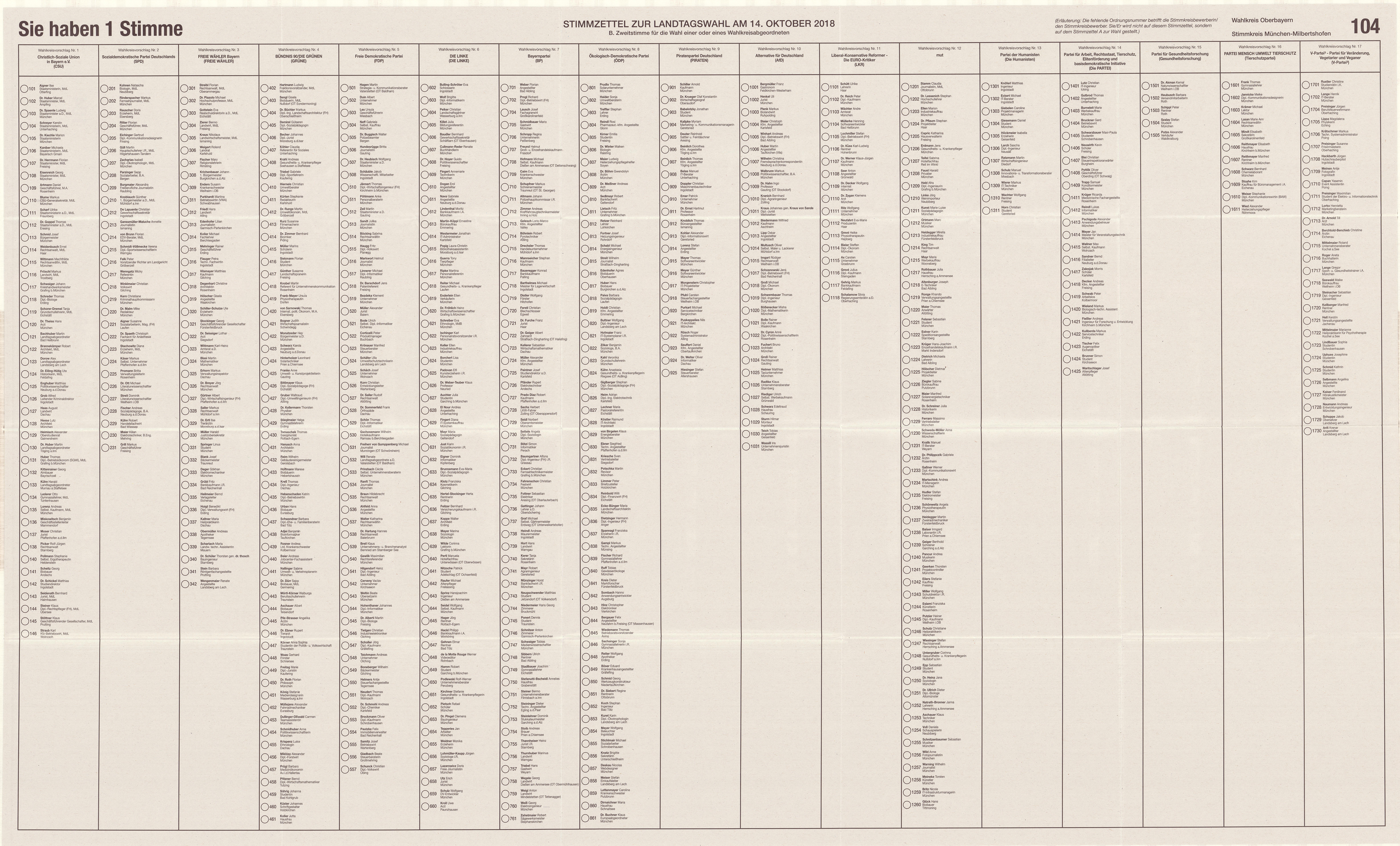
Ballot paper for the second vote in electoral district 104 of the Upper Bavaria constituency.

Bavaria, in line with the rest of the country, uses mixed-member proportional representation to elect its members of the Landtag. Party representation is not apportioned statewide, the distribution of seats takes place separately within the seven administrative districts (Regierungsbezirke), which are referred to in the electoral law as constituencies. The constituencies are divided into districts in which one member is directly elected. The number of single member districts is about half the number of seats in the constituency. In contrast to the Bundestag election law, the distribution of seats by proportional representation takes into account the parties' aggregate first (district) votes combined with their second (constituency) votes, i.e. both the first and second votes affect the distribution of seats in the Landtag, as opposed to just the second votes, which is the norm elsewhere in the country. If a party wins more district seats in a constituency than it would be entitled to based on a strictly proportional system (these extra seats are termed overhang seats), these seats are added to the constituency. To compensate the other parties for the overhang, leveling seats are added at the constituency level too. There is no statewide adjustment of the seats. Only parties and groups of voters who obtain at least 5% of the total votes (sum of first and second votes) in Bavaria participate in the distribution of seats. This threshold also applies to winning single-member districts; a party will forfeit all its district seats that it won if the party did not meet the 5% statewide threshold, with the forfeited district seats going to the second-place candidate.

Unlike the other German states (and also countries using MMP), Bavaria uses an open-list system for its party-list seats. Voters not only cast a vote for a candidate in their district, but they also cast a vote for a list candidate in their region. For the distribution of list seats, all district candidates are also constituency candidates with their parties. The party may also nominate regional-only candidates. To prevent double voting, the constituency ballots in each district omit the candidates running in that district. A candidate (if he or she did not win his or her district) is ranked within his or her list by the number of first votes he or she receives within the district plus the number of second votes he or she receives from voters elsewhere in the region. In this manner, voters collectively can produce a list that is different from what the party submitted, which can result in the defeat of candidates that would have been elected (and vice versa) had the election taken place under a closed-list system.

== Boundary changes ==
Constituencies for the Bavarian state election, 2018.

In the statutory constituency report of September 2016, the state government stated that the numerical distribution of the 180 state parliament seats among the constituencies would have to be changed due to changes in the number of inhabitants. It was recommended that a seat previously to be awarded in the Lower Franconia constituency be allocated to the Upper Bavaria constituency.

Within Upper Bavaria, the additional seat was used to reshape the single member districts in the state capital of Munich, as two of them — Giesing and Milbertshofen — exceeded the average population by more than 15 percent. Upper Bavaria now has 31 single member districts for the 2018 elections, nine of which are accounted for by the state capital.

Seats and single member districts are distributed as follows:

Constituency	Seats	Single-member districts
Upper Bavaria	61	31
Lower Bavaria	18	9
Upper Palatinate	16	8
Upper Franconia	16	8
Middle Franconia	24	12
Lower Franconia	19	10
Swabia	26	13
Total	180	91

=== Gerrymandering ===
In March 2017, the CSU used the mandatory redistricting to redraw Munich's electoral districts. In this, they were accused of gerrymandering; redistricting created a new Stimmkreis München-Mitte that was packing all parts of Munich that at the time favored the SPD. The Greens eventually won the district by a huge margin. The CSU was only partly successful in their gerrymandering, as they still lost four districts in Munich that were drawn to their advantage.

== Starting position ==
Since the state elections in Bavaria in 2013, the CSU again had the absolute majority of seats, as it did from 1962 to 2008. The CSU also held the position of the senior partner in all but one governing coalition in Bavaria since the end of World War II, including every coalition since 1958. In December 2017, however, Minister President of Bavaria Horst Seehofer (CSU) finally declared his renunciation of the top candidate in the state elections in Bavaria in 2018, partly due to the poor performance of the CSU in the 2017 Bundestag elections. In March 2018, he also resigned from his office as Minister President of Bavaria before the end of the parliamentary term. The former Bavarian Finance Minister Markus Söder was elected as the new top CSU candidate and later also as Minister President of Bavaria in the state parliament.

== Campaign ==
=== CSU ===
In 2018, the CSU Markus Söder's government enacted the Kreuzpflicht, an obligation to display crosses at the entrance of public buildings. Söder has stated that the crosses are not to be seen as Christian symbols, but as symbols of Bavarian cultural identity.

Some observers have described the Kreuzpflicht as a measure to appeal to voters deserting the Christian democratic conservative CSU for the right-wing nationalist AfD party. Also the CSU interior minister Horst Seehofer has taken a harder line on immigration.

== Parties ==
The table below lists parties represented in the 17th Landtag of Bavaria since 2013. The AfD, having been founded earlier that year, did not run yet.

Name		Ideology	Leader(s)	2013 result	
Name		Ideology	Leader(s)	Votes (%)	Seats
CSU	Christian Social Union in Bavaria; Christlich-Soziale Union in Bayern	Christian democracy	Markus Söder	47.7%	101 / 180
SPD	Social Democratic Party of Germany; Sozialdemokratische Partei Deutschlands	Social democracy	Natascha Kohnen	20.6%	42 / 180
FW	Free Voters of Bavaria; Freie Wähler Bayern	Regionalism	Hubert Aiwanger	9.0%	19 / 180
Grüne	Alliance 90/The Greens; Bündnis 90/Die Grünen	Green politics	Katharina Schulze; Ludwig Hartmann	8.6%	18 / 180

== Leaders' debate ==
A leaders' debate between Minister President Markus Söder (CSU) and Ludwig Hartmann (Alliance 90/The Greens) took place on 26 September 2018. The Bayerischer Rundfunk justified the party selection with the result of the Bayerntrend of September 12, 2018, according to which CSU and Greens can hope for the most votes in the election. SPD Secretary-General Uli Grötsch described this decision as "completely absurd". A programme with representatives of the other five parties, whose survey results were above or close to the five percent hurdle, followed on 28 September 2018: Natascha Kohnen (SPD), Hubert Aiwanger (Free Voters), Martin Sichert (AfD), Martin Hagen (FDP) and Ates Gürpinar (The Left). The first programme was moderated by BR editor-in-chief Christian Nitsche, the second by Ursula Heller.

== Opinion polling ==
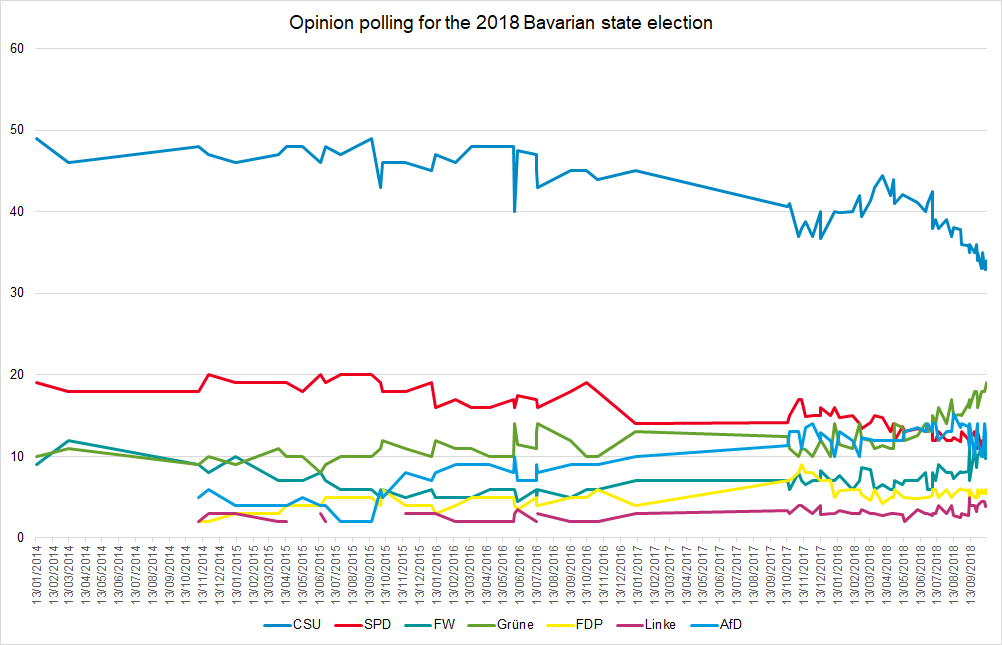

Polling firm	Fieldwork date	Sample size	CSU	SPD	FW	Grüne	FDP	Linke	AfD	Others	Lead
2018 state election	14 Oct 2018	–	37.2	9.7	11.6	17.6	5.1	3.2	10.2	5.4	19.6
Forschungsgruppe Wahlen	10–11 Oct 2018	1,075	34	12	10	19	5.5	4	10	5.5	15
Civey	6–10 Oct 2018	5,063	32.9	11.0	9.8	18.5	5.9	3.9	12.8	5.2	14.4
INSA	2–8 Oct 2018	1,707	33	10	11	18	5.5	4.5	14	4	15
Forschungsgruppe Wahlen	1–4 Oct 2018	1,122	35	12	10	18	5.5	4.5	10	5	17
Infratest dimap	1–2 Oct 2018	1,002	33	11	11	18	6	4.5	10	6.5	15
GMS	20–26 Sep 2018	1,004	35	13	10	16	5	4	12	5	19
INSA	21–25 Sep 2018	1,064	34	11	10	17	6	4	14	4	17
Civey	19–23 Sep 2018	5,061	36.0	12.0	8.6	17.9	5.0	3.3	13.2	4.0	18.1
Forschungsgruppe Wahlen	17–19 Sep 2018	1,114	35	13	11	18	5	4	10	4	17
Infratest dimap	5–10 Sep 2018	1,000	35	11	11	17	5	5	11	5	18
GMS	4–10 Sep 2018	1,006	36	12	7	16	6	4	14	5	20
Civey	30 Aug–9 Sep 2018	5,046	35.8	12.1	8.1	16.5	5.8	2.7	13.7	5.3	19.3
INSA	23–27 Aug 2018	1,033	36	13	8	15	6	3	14	5	21
Civey	15–26 Aug 2018	5,049	37.8	11.8	8.1	15.1	6.1	2.5	13.5	5.1	22.7
Civey	30 Jul–13 Aug 2018	5,047	38.1	12.3	7.3	15.0	5.3	2.7	15.2	4.1	22.9
Forsa	25 Jul–9 Aug 2018	1,105	37	12	8	17	5	4	13	4	20
GMS	25–31 Jul 2018	1,004	39	12	8	14	6	3	13	5	25
Infratest dimap	11–16 Jul 2018	1,003	38	13	9	16	5	4	12	3	22
GMS	5–11 Jul 2018	1,007	39	12	7	14	6	3	14	5	25
Forsa	4–6 Jul 2018	1,003	38	12	8	15	6	3	14	4	23
Civey	23 Jun–5 Jul 2018	5,093	42.5	13.7	6.0	13.2	5.2	2.8	13.1	3.5	28.8
INSA	25–27 Jun 2018	1,231	41	13	6	13	5	3	14	5	27
Forsa	21–22 Jun 2018	1,033	40	13	8	14	5	3	13	4	26
Civey	19 May–7 Jun 2018	5,066	41.1	13.4	7.0	12.6	4.8	3.5	13.5	4.1	27.6
GMS	11–16 May 2018	1,005	42	13	7	12	5	2	13	6	29
Civey	23 Apr–11 May 2018	5,082	42.1	13.7	6.6	13.5	5.1	2.9	12.0	4.1	28.4
Infratest dimap	22–27 Apr 2018	1,002	41	12	7	14	6	3	12	5	27
GMS	20–26 Apr 2018	1,002	44	14	6	11	5	3	12	5	30
INSA	17–20 Apr 2018	1,005	42	13	6	13	7	3	13	3	29
Civey	19 Mar–5 Apr 2018	5,048	44.5	14.8	6.5	11.3	4.2	2.8	11.9	4.0	29.7
GMS	16–21 Mar 2018	1,004	43	15	6	11	6	3	12	4	28
Civey	2–15 Mar 2018	5,004	41.4	14.2	8.4	12.0	4.6	3.0	12.1	4.3	27.2
Civey	12–26 Feb 2018	5,040	39.4	13.4	8.6	12.2	5.3	3.5	12.3	5.3	26.0
Forsa	8–22 Feb 2018	1,027	42	14	7	14	6	3	10	4	28
GMS	1–9 Feb 2018	1,510	40	15	6	11	6	3	12	7	25
Civey	6–16 Jan 2018	5,040	39.9	14.8	7.6	11.4	5.8	3.4	13.1	4.0	21.1
Infratest dimap	3–8 Jan 2018	1,002	40	16	7	14	5	3	10	5	24
GMS	27 Dec 2017–1 Jan 2018	1,007	39	15	7	10	7	3	12	7	24
INSA	12–13 Dec 2017	1,003	40	15	7	12	7	4	12	3	25
Civey	24 Nov–13 Dec 2017	5,019	36.7	16.0	8.3	12.1	7.1	2.9	12.9	4.0	20.7
GMS	27–29 Nov 2017	1,006	37	15	7	10	8	3	14	6	22
Civey	16 Oct–16 Nov 2017	5,034	38.8	14.9	6.5	10.8	8.0	3.6	13.5	3.9	23.9
Forsa	6–9 Nov 2017	1,017	38	17	7	11	9	4	11	3	21
INSA	2–3 Nov 2017	1,033	37	17	8	10	8	4	13	3	20
GMS	13–18 Oct 2017	1,004	41	15	6	11	7	3	13	4	26
Civey	25 Sep–13 Oct 2017	5,043	40.7	14.1	7.0	12.4	7.1	3.4	11.3	4.0	26.6
2017 federal election	24 Sep 2017	–	38.8	15.3	2.7	9.8	10.2	6.1	12.4	4.8	23.5
Infratest dimap	4–9 Jan 2017	1,001	45	14	7	13	4	3	10	4	31
GMS	27 Oct–2 Nov 2016	1,005	44	18	6	10	6	2	9	5	26
GMS	8–12 Oct 2016	1,013	45	19	6	10	5	2	9	4	26
GMS	9–14 Sep 2016	1,015	45	18	5	12	5	2	9	4	27
Forsa	4–15 Jul 2016	1,008	43	16	6	14	4	3	8	6	27
Infratest dimap	11–14 Jul 2016	1,000	45	17	5	13	4	–	9	7	28
GMS	8–13 Jul 2016	1,015	47	17	6	11	5	2	7	5	30
INSA	17 May–8 Jun 2016	1,698	47.5	17.5	4.5	11.5	3.5	3.5	7	5	30
Forsa	23 May–3 Jun 2016	1,010	40	16	6	14	4	3	10	7	24
GMS	27 May–1 Jun 2016	1,021	48	17	6	10	5	2	8	4	31
GMS	15–19 Apr 2016	1,018	48	16	6	10	5	2	9	4	32
GMS	14–16 Mar 2016	1,015	48	16	5	11	5	2	9	4	32
GMS	12–17 Feb 2016	1,010	46	17	5	11	4	2	9	6	29
Infratest dimap	7–11 Jan 2016	1,000	47	16	5	12	3	3	8	6	31
GMS	28 Dec 2015–3 Jan 2016	1,019	45	19	6	10	4	3	7	6	26
GMS	12–18 Nov 2015	1,016	46	18	5	11	4	3	8	5	28
GMS	1–7 Oct 2015	1,019	46	18	6	12	6	–	5	7	28
Forsa	23 Sep–2 Oct 2015	1,007	43	19	5	11	4	3	6	9	24
GMS	10–16 Sep 2015	1,007	49	20	6	10	5	–	2	8	29
GMS	16–22 Jul 2015	1,011	47	20	6	10	5	–	2	10	27
GMS	18–24 Jun 2015	1,012	48	19	7	9	5	2	4	6	29
INSA	5–15 Jun 2015	651	46	20	8	8	4	3	4	7	26
GMS	7–13 May 2015	1,008	48	18	7	10	4	–	5	8	30
GMS	9–15 Apr 2015	1,016	48	19	7	10	4	2	4	6	29
Forsa	19–31 Mar 2015	1,266	47	19	7	11	3	2	4	7	28
Infratest dimap	8–12 Jan 2015	1,004	46	19	10	9	3	3	4	6	27
GMS	Nov 2014	2,000	49	18	7	9	2	2	5	8	31
pollytix	13–23 Nov 2014	1,700	47	20	8	10	2	3	6	4	27
Emnid	1 Oct–4 Nov 2014	2,114	48	18	9	9	2	2	5	7	30
2014 European election	25 May 2014	–	40.5	20.1	4.3	12.1	3.1	2.9	8.1	9.0	20.4
Infratest dimap	10–12 Mar 2014	1,002	46	18	12	11	–	–	–	13	28
Infratest dimap	9–13 Jan 2014	1,004	49	19	9	10	4	2	–	7	30
2013 federal election	22 Sep 2013	–	49.3	20.0	2.7	8.4	5.1	3.8	4.3	6.4	29.3
2013 state election	15 Sep 2013	–	47.7	20.6	9.0	8.6	3.3	2.1	–	8.7	27.1

=== Policy areas relevant to elections ===
On behalf of the RTL/n-tv Trendbarometer, Forsa Institute interviewed the survey participants about the "biggest problems at state level". In Bavaria, 34 percent of those surveyed named the CSU and Prime Minister Markus Söder, 28 percent named refugees, and 26 percent named "the situation on the housing market".

Infratest dimap asked respondents to the ARD primary election survey which topic is very important for their election decision. In the order of most percentage points these were school and education policy (55%), nature conservation in Bavaria (46%), creation of affordable housing (45%), reduction of injustice in society (41%), security and police (40%), regulation of immigration (39%), the behaviour of Horst Seehofer in the federal government (26%), the cooperation of CDU, CSU and SPD in the federal government (21%).

== Voter turnout ==
The voter turnout in the city of Munich remained high. Until 2 p.m. it was 54.6 percent including the postal voters. In 2013, the turnout at that time was 49.7 percent. The final total turnout was recorded as 72.3% of eligible voters.

== Election result ==
Summary of the 14 October 2018 election results for the Landtag of Bavaria
Party	Ideology	Votes	Votes % (change)		Seats (change)		Seats %
Christian Social Union (CSU)	Christian democracy	5,046,081	37.2%	−10.5pp	85	−16	41.5%
Alliance '90/The Greens (Grünen)	Green politics	2,392,356	17.6%	+9.0pp	38	+20	18.5%
Free Voters (FW)	Regionalism	1,572,792	11.6%	+2.6pp	27	+8	13.2%
Alternative for Germany (AfD)	German nationalism	1,388,622	10.2%	+10.2pp	22	+22	10.7%
Social Democratic Party (SPD)	Social democracy	1,309,078	9.7%	−11.0pp	22	−20	10.7%
Free Democratic Party (FDP)	Liberalism	690,499	5.1%	+1.8pp	11	+11	5.4%
The Left (Die Linke)	Democratic socialism	437,888	3.2%	+1.1pp	0	±0	0%
Bavaria Party (BP)	Bavarian nationalism	231,731	1.7%	−0.4pp	0	±0	0%
Ecological Democratic Party (ÖDP)	Green conservatism	211,951	1.6%	−0.5pp	0	±0	0%
Pirate Party (Piraten)	Pirate politics	59,145	0.4%	−1.5pp	0	±0	0%
Party for Franconia (Die Franken)	Regionalism	31,453	0.2%	−0.5pp	0	±0	0%
Others		193,151			0	±0	0%
Total		13,564,747	100.0%		205	+25	

Popular vote
CSU	37.1%
Grünen	17.6%
FW	11.6%
AFD	10.2%
SPD	9.7%
FDP	5.1%
LINKE	3.2%
BP	1.7%
ÖDP	1.6%
Others	0.7%

Seats
CSU	41.5%
Grünen	18.5%
FW	13.2%
AFD	10.7%
SPD	10.7%
FDP	5.4%

== Aftermath ==
=== Preferred coalition polling ===
The percentages indicate the proportion of respondents who would most like the particular coalition available for selection. The percentages do not sum to 100% due to respondents who did not indicate a preference.

Institute	Date	CSU only	CSU Grüne	Grüne SPD FDP FW	CSU AfD	CSU FW
Civey	18 September 2018	19.3 %	15.4%	15.3%	13.7%	10.1%

=== State government formation ===
Before the election, CSU faction leader Thomas Kreuzer declared that the CSU would not form a coalition with the AfD or the Greens after the election.

The CSU agreed on a coalition deal to govern with the Free Voters of Bavaria on 4 November 2018.
