= Katharina Schulze =

German politician

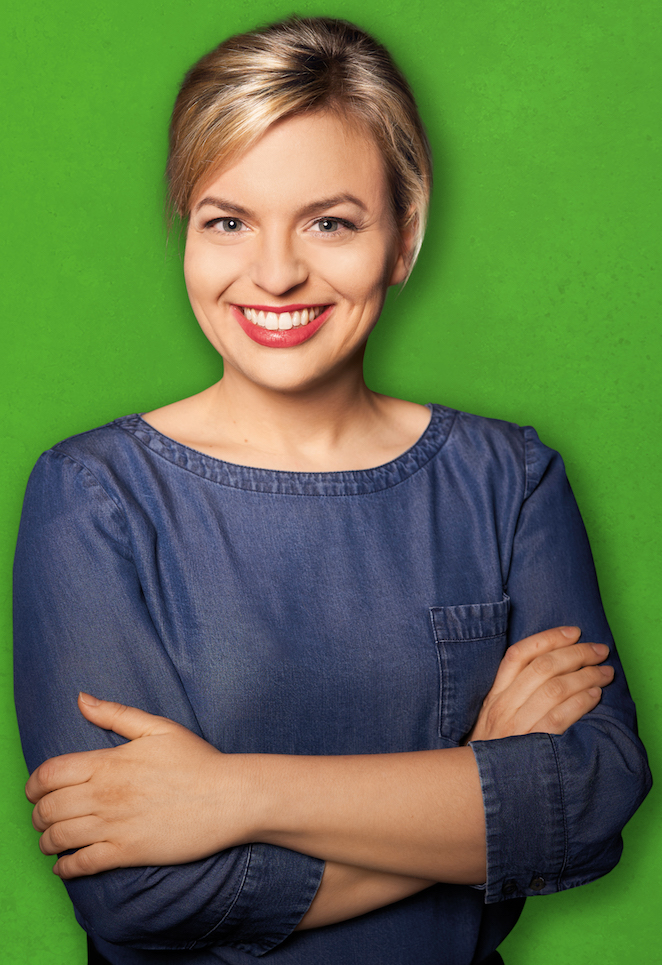

Leader of the Alliance 90/The Greens group in the Landtag of Bavaria
- Incumbent
- Assumed office 15 February 2017 Serving with Ludwig Hartmann
- Preceded by: Margarete Bause

Personal details
- Born: 20 June 1985 (age 41) Freiburg im Breisgau, West Germany
- Party: Alliance 90/The Greens
- Education: LMU Munich; University of California, San Diego; Technical University of Munich

Katharina Elisabeth Schulze (born 20 June 1985) is a German politician of Alliance 90/The Greens who has been serving as a member of the State Parliament of Bavaria (Landtag) since 2013. Along with Ludwig Hartmann, she was one of the two leading candidates of her party in the 2018 Bavarian state election. Since 2019, she has been part of her party's national leadership, under co-chairs Annalena Baerbock and Robert Habeck.

== Early life and education ==
Schulze was born in Freiburg and grew up in Herrsching am Ammersee. Ahead of the 2008 United States presidential election, she was a volunteer for the campaign of the Democratic Party's candidate Barack Obama in Michigan.

== Political career ==
From 2010 to 2015, Schulze served as chairwoman of the Green Party in Munich.

Schulze has been a member of the Landtag of Bavaria since the 2013 elections, representing Upper Bavaria. She has been serving as her parliamentary group's chair since 2017, succeeding Margarete Bause. In addition, she has been a member of the Committee on Legal Affairs (2015–2017) and the Committee on Municipal Affairs and Security (since 2013).

== Other activities ==
- Bavarian School of Public Policy (HfP), Member of the advisory board (2015–2018)
- Leaders Europe 2020, the Obama Foundation

== Political positions ==
In 2010, Schulze opposed Munich's bid for the 2018 Winter Olympics.

== Personal life ==
Schulze has been in a relationship with fellow Green Party politician Danyal Bayaz since 2019. In 2021, the couple's son was born.
