= Hubert Aiwanger =

German politician (1971–2026)

Hubert Aiwanger MdL MdBR
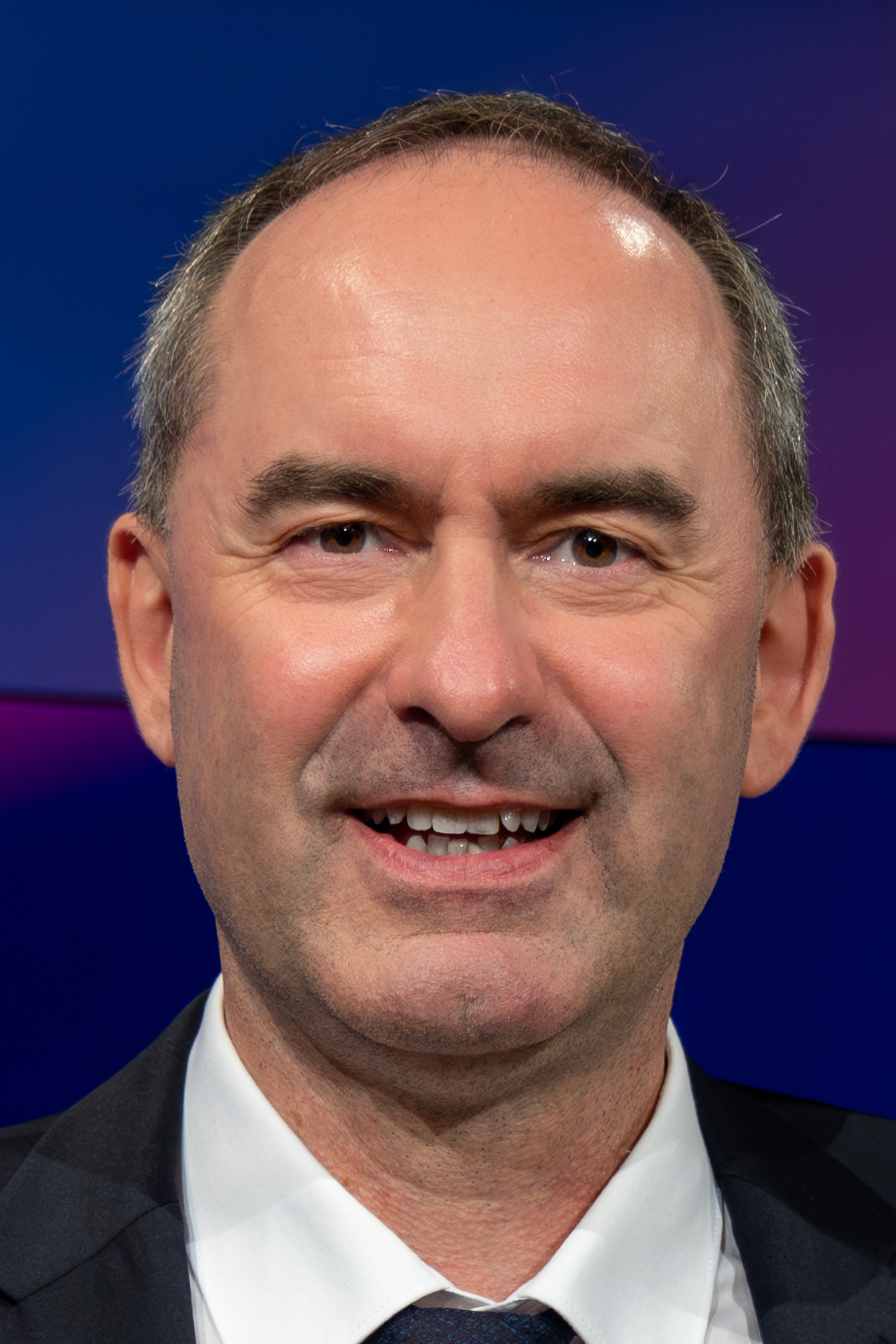
- Aiwanger in 2023

Deputy Minister-President of Bavaria
- In office 12 November 2018 – 4 November 2026
- Minister-President: Markus Söder
- Preceded by: Ilse Aigner

Minister of Economic Affairs, Regional Development and Energy
- In office 12 November 2018 – 4 November 2026
- Minister-President: Markus Söder
- Preceded by: Franz Pschierer (Economic Affairs, Energy and Technology)

Leader of the Free Voters
- In office 27 March 2010 – 4 November 2026
- Deputy: Manfred Petry; Gabi Schmidt; Gregor Voht; Engin Eroglu; Denise Wendt
- Preceded by: Armin Grein

Leader of the Free Voters of Bavaria
- In office 25 March 2006 – 4 November 2026
- Deputy: Armin Kroder; Michael Piazolo; Ilse Ertl; Ulrike Müller
- Preceded by: Armin Grein

Leader of the Free Voters of Bavaria in the Landtag of Bavaria
- In office 21 October 2008 – 5 November 2018
- Preceded by: Position established
- Succeeded by: Florian Streibl

Member of the Landtag of Bavaria for Lower Bavaria
- In office 21 October 2008 – 4 November 2026
- Preceded by: Multi-member district

Personal details
- Born: 26 January 1971 Ergoldsbach, Bavaria, West Germany
- Died: 4 November 2026 (aged 55) Berlin, Germany
- Party: Free Voters
- Relations: Tanja Schweiger
- Children: 2
- Education: Weihenstephan Triesdorf University of Applied Sciences
- Website: hubert-aiwanger.de

Military service
- Allegiance: Germany
- Branch: Bundeswehr
- Service years: 1990–1991

Hubert Aiwanger (26 January 1971 – 4 November 2026) was a German politician. He was the party leader of the Free Voters (German: Freie Wähler) from 2018 to 2026, the Deputy Minister-President of Bavaria and Bavarian Minister of Economic Affairs, Regional Development and Energy.

Aiwanger was both the faction leader of the Federal Association of Free Voters and the Bavarian State Association of Free and Independent Voters, in addition to being the chairman of the Federal Free Voters Party and the Free Voters of Bavaria Party. He acted as the party leader of the parliamentary faction of the Free Voters of Bavaria from 2008 on.

== Early life ==
Aiwanger was born in Ergoldsbach, Bavaria, on 26 January 1971. Upon graduating from the Burkhart-Gymnasium in Mallersdorf-Pfaffenberg and subsequently finishing his compulsory military service, he studied agricultural sciences at the Weihenstephan College with tuition assistance from the Hanns-Seidel-Stiftung, receiving a degree in Agricultural Engineering. Aiwanger was a Roman Catholic and spoke often in the Central Bavarian dialect.

== Political career ==
Aiwanger joined the Free Voters shortly before the council elections of 2002. He ran as a candidate for the city council of Rottenburg an der Laaber, but narrowly lost the race. He then shortly thereafter rose through the party ranks, joining the regional council of Rottenburg. In 2004 he became a member of the county council in Landshut and had a brief tenure as the district chairman.

In a surprising series of events he was narrowly elected State Chairman of the Free Voters of Bavaria in a party meeting on 25 March 2006, held in Garching bei München, winning 340 votes against 322, after the previous chairman declined to run.

His greatest success came as a result of the 2008 elections, wherein he and the Free Voters won 10.2% of the vote, putting them past the threshold required by the Bavarian Parliament.

He was a member of the City Council in Rottenburg an der Laaber since March 2008 and was a district council member in Landshut.

At the executive elections of the Federal Association in Berlin on 27 March 2010 Aiwanger was elected federal chairman of the Free Voters.

On 13 October 2012, he was symbolically nominated as the leading candidate of the Free Voters in Bavaria for the local state election.

Aiwanger failed to reach his goal of leading the Free Voters to the European Parliament in 2009. However, following the successful lawsuits against the percentage hurdle, in May 2014 the Free Voters for the first time sent an MEP to the European Parliament, Ulrike Müller.

After the 2018 state elections, he and the Free Voters joined a coalition Government with the leading CSU (Christian Social Union, German: Christlich-Soziale Union), which placed them in the governing Party for the first time. Aiwanger subsequently became the Deputy Prime Minister of Bavaria and became the Bavarian Minister of Economic Affairs, Regional Development and Energy.

== Personal life and death ==
Aiwanger was the partner of Tanja Schweiger, who has served as Landrätin of Landkreis Regensburg since May 2014. The couple had two sons, born 3 October 2012 and 18 October 2016.

On 4 November 2026 at 7 p.m. Aiwanger was found dead in his hotel room in Berlin. He was in the city to deliver a speech for the opening of a new office of the Freie Wähler party in Berlin, but had cancelled because he felt unwell. After the ceremony's opening at 5:30 p.m. he did not answer the phone and was found dead by a hotel porter. The Berlin public prosecutor's office said that forensic medical examinations confirmed a natural death.

== Criticisms ==
=== Leadership style ===
Aiwanger was accused of lack of leadership by members of the Federal Executive of Free Voters, especially regarding alleged poor housekeeping of some national associations. This led to the resignation of the Federal Managing Director Cordula Breitenfellner and Judge Bernd Richter. After the designated candidate for the federal election, Stephan Werhahn, allegedly criticized Aiwanger, saying, among other things, "dictatorial leadership conditions as in Cuba", the board of Saarland demanded his resignation as federal chairman.

The run-up to the federal election in 2013 was met with criticism from within the Free Voters Party.

=== Twitter jokes ===
In January and February 2012, Aiwanger was criticised for tweeting jokes and, as a result of criticism from within his party, he deleted his Twitter account on 9 February 2012. He reopened his account in February 2016.

=== Antisemitic pamphlet ===
In August 2023, the Süddeutsche Zeitung reported on a pamphlet with antisemitic contents that Aiwanger may have authored and distributed at his high school some 35 years ago as a 17-year-old. Aiwanger admitted to carrying copies in his satchel but denied writing the document. His older brother, a student at the same school at the time, later took responsibility for writing the antisemitic pamphlet itself. The Süddeutsche Zeitung drew some criticism for publishing the story, six weeks before the 2023 Bavarian state election, without conclusive evidence and without talking to Aiwanger before publication. Bavarian premier Markus Söder demanded that Aiwanger answer 25 questions on the matter, including whether Aiwanger had actively distributed the antisemitic pamphlet. Aiwanger claimed multiple times to "not remember." Aiwanger's responses were criticised as short and evasive.

In his response to a question about other incidents, Aiwanger shortly mentioned that he remembers an unrelated incident in the arts class and noted a caution against breach of secrecy. Despite the story, Aiwanger's party saw an increase in support in the polls.

== Positions ==
=== Migration and immigration policy ===
Aiwanger said in the context of the refugee crisis that Germany must be "satisfied and happy" that Austria would no longer beckon refugees. He also commented positively on the fact that the Balkan route was closed, but at the same time warned against new waves of refugees. Aiwanger said that politically persecuted people must receive asylum, but he sees them as "temporary guests". Aiwanger complained that the immigration policy was poorly controlled. He subsequently advocated immigration according to the Canadian merit-based model.

=== EU bailouts ===
Aiwanger positioned the Free Voters as a protest party against the euro bailout policy. Their demonstrations for this cause have been criticized by, amongst others, the Green Party.

== Political achievements ==
=== Referendum campaign designed to reintroduce the G9 Gymnasium system ===
Aiwanger and the Free Voters successfully organized a referendum on the issue of the Gymnasium length in 2014 with the intent of reintroducing the 9 year Gymnasium in Bavaria as opposed to the 8 year Gymnasium that most states in Germany had started switching to since the early 2000s. The Free Voters succeeded in reinstituting the G9, despite opposition from the CSU, who wanted to introduce a "flexibilization year" for Gymnasium students, i.e. an optional 9th year, as well as the Greens, who simply want to improve the G8 system.

=== Abolition of tuition fees in higher education ===
From 17 until 30 July 2013, Aiwanger and the Free Voters successfully campaigned for a referendum to abolish college tuition in Bavaria. The referendum "No to school tuitions in Bavaria" (German: Nein zu Studiengebühren in Bayern) earned 14.3% of the 2013 vote. After the Bavarian Parliament approved the proposal it was implemented during the 2013/2014 school year.

=== Abolition of road improvements contribution taxes ===
Under Aiwanger's leadership, the Free Voters have also successfully abolished taxes regarding road improvement contributions (German: Straßenbaubeitrag, shortened to Strab). This tax was paid for by homeowners on the street in which road improvement was occurring in order to finance the road maintenance. After 1 January 2018, this tax was no longer levied due to the Free Voters' efforts.
