= Ludwig Hartmann =

German politician (born 1978)

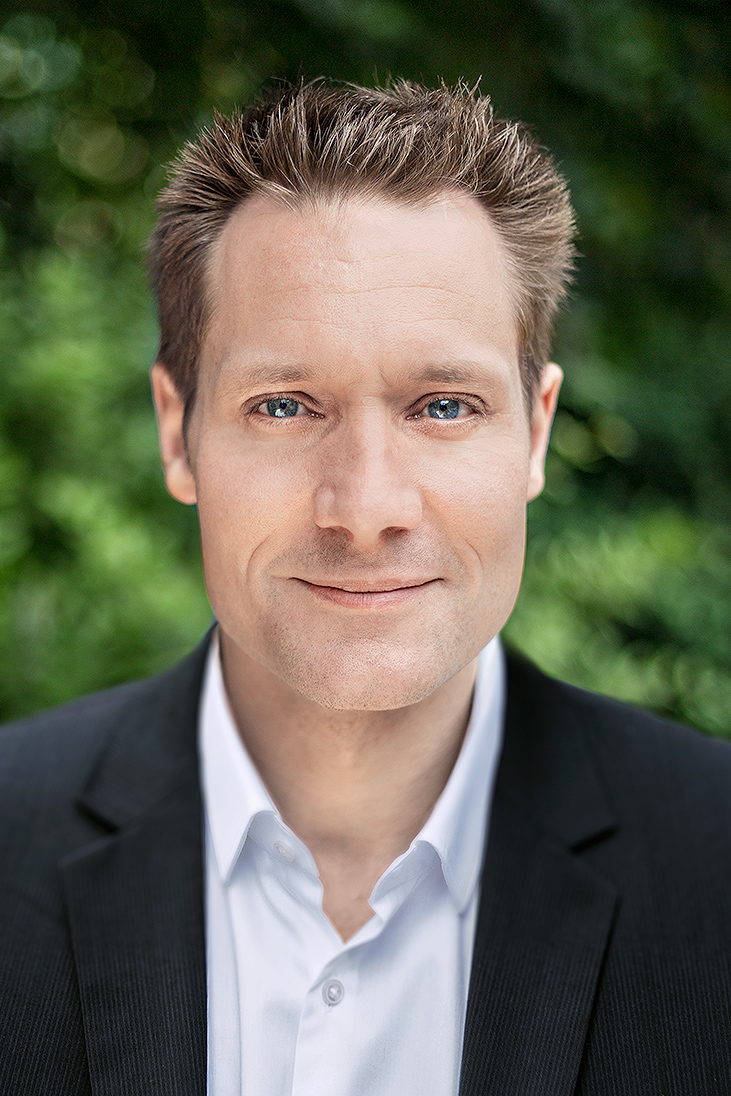
Hartmann in 2013

Ludwig Hartmann (born 20 July 1978) is a German politician (Alliance 90/The Greens) and communication designer. He was, along with Katharina Schulze, one of the two leading candidates of his party in the 2018 Bavarian state election.

Hartmann was born in Landsberg am Lech. He has been a member of the Landtag of Bavaria, the state parliament, since 2008 and one of the two faction leaders of his party in the Landtag since 2013. Prior to the 2018 elections, on 26 September 2018, he took part in the first TV debate between a Green leading candidate and a CSU Minister-President (Markus Söder).
