= Party for Franconia =

Party for Franconia Partei für Franken
- Abbreviation: DIE FRANKEN
- Leader: Robert Gattenlöhner
- General Secretary: Bernd Bub
- Deputy Leaders: See list: Andreas Brandl Christiane von Thüngen Hans-Jürgen Dietel
- Founded: 31 October 2009; 16 years ago
- Headquarters: Waldstraße 55 91154 Roth
- Membership (2019): 272
- Ideology: Social democracy Franconian Nationalism; Regionalism
- Colours: Red, White
- Bundestag: 0 / 630
- European Parliament: 0 / 96
- Landtag of Bavaria: 0 / 203

Website
- partei-fuer-franken.de

The Party for Franconia (German: Partei für Franken) also known as Frankenpartei is a minor party in Germany aimed primarily at people in the Franconian regions of Bavaria.

== Elections ==
In 2013, the party stood for the first time in the Bavarian state election, competing in three of Bavaria's seven Regierungsbezirke; Upper Franconia, Middle Franconia and Lower Franconia. It received 2.9% of the vote in Upper Franconia, 2.3% in Middle Franconia and 1.6% in Lower Franconia (2.2% of votes in the Franconian Regierungsbezirke and 0.7% of all votes in Bavaria).

In 2014, it stood in the Bavarian local election for Feucht, Hof and Roth. In Feucht, it received 4.8% of the vote, gaining it one seat, in Hof it received 5.5% of the vote, gaining it two seats, and in Roth it received 4.4% of the vote, gaining it one seat.

Party for Franconia stood in the 2018 Bavarian state election, but unlike in 2013, only ran in Middle Franconia and Lower Franconia. It received significantly fewer votes than in 2013, garnering only 1.1% in Middle Franconia and 0.8% in Lower Franconia (0.2% statewide).

== Goal of the Party ==
The Party of Franconia aims to create a Franconian free state within Germany.
