= Gabi Schmidt =

German community leader and politician

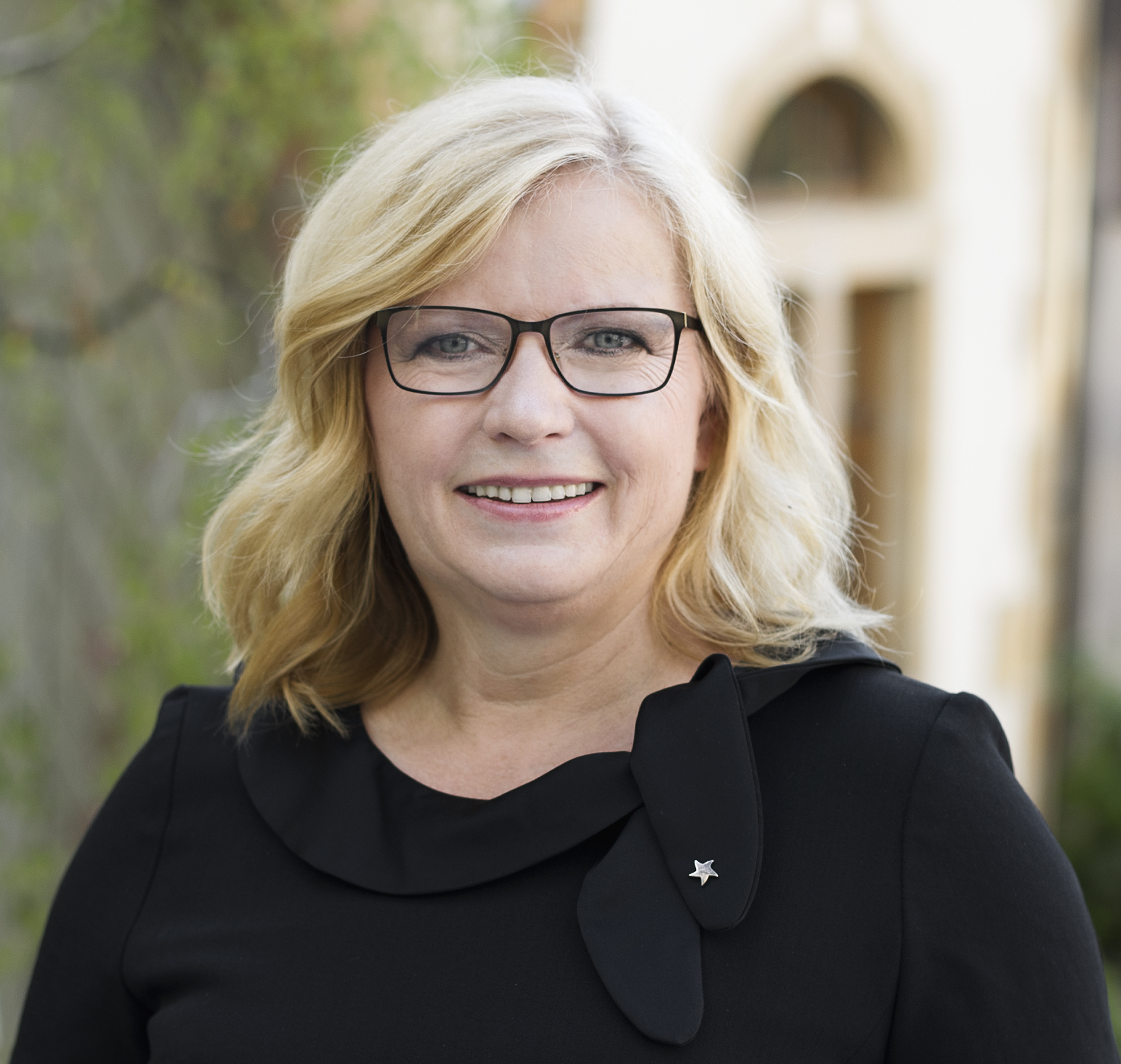
Schmidt in 2018

Gabi Schmidt (née Sandman; born 17 January 1968 in Neustadt an der Aisch) is a German community leader, politician, and MP of the Free Voters in the Bavarian Parliament.

== Life ==
Schmidt has been a Free Voters Member of Parliament since 2013, and was their candidate for the voting district of Neustadt an der Aisch-Bad Windscheim, Fürth-Land, and was part of the Free Voters’ party list for Middle-Franconia. She is responsible for the party affairs of the Free Voters in the counties of Neustadt/Aisch-Bad Windsheim, Fürth, Erlangen-Höchstadt, as well as Nürmberg.

Her main focus is the Free Voters' regional social and educational policy, and as such she is part of the Bavarian Parliament’s Committee for Education and Culture, and is the Free Voters Parliamentary Faction’s Spokesperson on Education. In addition, Gabi Schmidt is also the faction’s vice-chair in the Free Voter’s Parliamentary Faction.

Since October 2013 she has served as the vice-chair of the Federal Free Voter’s Party. She is also the party chair of the county party branch in Neustadt/Aisch-Bad Windsheim, and party chair of the voting district 510. She is a leading figure in the Party’s programmatic and agenda work due to her rolls as manager of the State Taskforce on Families and Social Affairs and manager of the Federal Panel on Social Affairs.

In March 2014 she became affiliated with the European Democratic Party (EDP), which is a part of the Alliance of Liberals and Democrats for Europe Faction in the EU Parliament.

From 2013 until 2018 Gabi Schmidt has submitted 198 written inquires to the State Government and has given 75 speeches in the Parliamentary Plenum. Furthermore, she has submitted numerous bills.

In the 2018 Bavarian State Parliamentary Elections, Schmidt raised her voter share from 8.32% to 12.77%, and in her home district she raised it from 8.98% to 14.81%. Schmidt was reelected to Parliament in 2018.

She currently resides in Uehfeld.
