= Ulrike Müller (politician) =

German politician

Ulrike Müller MEP
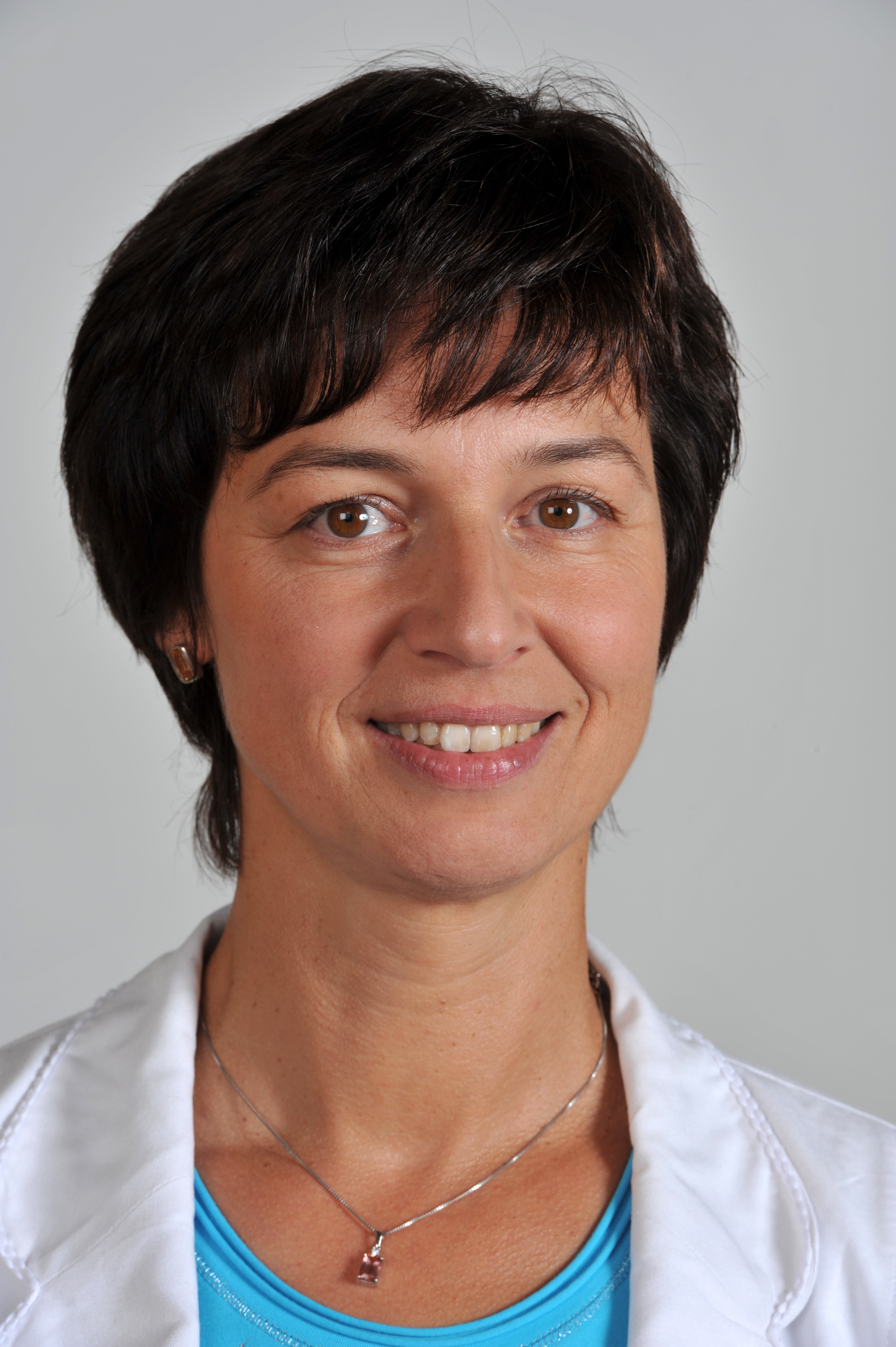
- Müller in 2012

Member of the European Parliament
- In office 1 July 2014 – 16 July 2024
- Constituency: Germany

Personal details
- Born: 7 December 1962 (age 63) Augsburg, Germany
- Party: German; Free Voters; EU; Alliance of Liberals and Democrats for Europe
- Website: www.fw-europa.com

Ulrike Müller (born 7 December 1962) is a German politician and Member of the European Parliament (MEP) from Germany. She is a member of Free Voters, part of the Alliance of Liberals and Democrats for Europe (2014–2019) and Renew Europe (since 2019). Since Oct 2023 she is also a Member of the Bavarian Parliament. Means she has two MP Positions.

== Life ==
Ulrike Müller runs a family farm specialised in dairy production in Oberallgäu (district in Bavaria, Germany). She is married and has two adult children.

== Political career ==
From 1996 to 2008, she was a local councillor (Gemeinderätin) in Missen-Wilhams (from 2002 to 2008 also Deputy Major (2. Bürgermeisterin). Besides, she was a member of the county council (Mitglied des Kreistags) of Oberallgäu from 1996 to 2014, and from 2002 to 2008 also deputy county commissioner (stellvertretende Landrätin).

In the Bavarian state election (Landtagswahl) of 2008 she gained a seat for the constituency of Swabia in the Bavarian state parliament. She served in the parliamentarian committee for Nutrition, Agriculture and Forestry and was spokeswomen on related topics for her party, Freie Wähler. From October 2013 until her leaving the state parliament in 2014, she was deputy parliamentary leader of Freie Wähler as well as their spokesperson on forestry and hunting.

Freie Wähler nominated her as front-runner for the election of the European Parliament. In March 2014 she joined the European Democratic Party (EDP).

Ulrike Müller joined the European Parliament following the election of May 25, 2014. In December 2014, she was unanimously elected deputy President of EDP, which was then part of the Alliance of Liberals and Democrats for Europe (ALDE).

Since her re-election in 2019, she has been part of the Renew Europe Group (successor of ALDE) and is the Renew spokeswoman on agricultural affaires.

In November 2019 she was elected deputy executive vice president of the European Democratic Party.

== Membership in Parliamentary Committees ==
Since July 2014 and again after her re-election in 2019, Müller has been a member in the Committee on Agriculture and Regional Development and a deputy member in die Committee on the Environment, Public Health and Food Safety. She is rapporteur and chief negotiator for the reform of the Common Agricultural Policy (GAP) for the chapter on finance, administration and monitoring of the GAP.

In 2018, Müller was a member in the Special Committee on the Union’s authorisation procedure for pesticides. Last, she has been a member in the Committee on Petitions since July 2019.

== Membership in Parliamentary Delegations ==
Since November 2017, Müller has been chairwoman of the Delegation for relations with Australia and New Zealand. Since 2014, she has been a member of the Delegation for relations with the countries of South Asia. She is part of the Delegation to the ACP-EU Joint Parliamentary Assembly.

== Parliamentary service ==
- Member, Committee on Agriculture and Rural Development (2014–)
- Member, Delegation for relations with the countries of South Asia (2014–2019)
- Member, Delegation for relations with Australia and New Zealand (2019–)
