= Engin Eroglu =

German politician

Engin Eroglu MEP
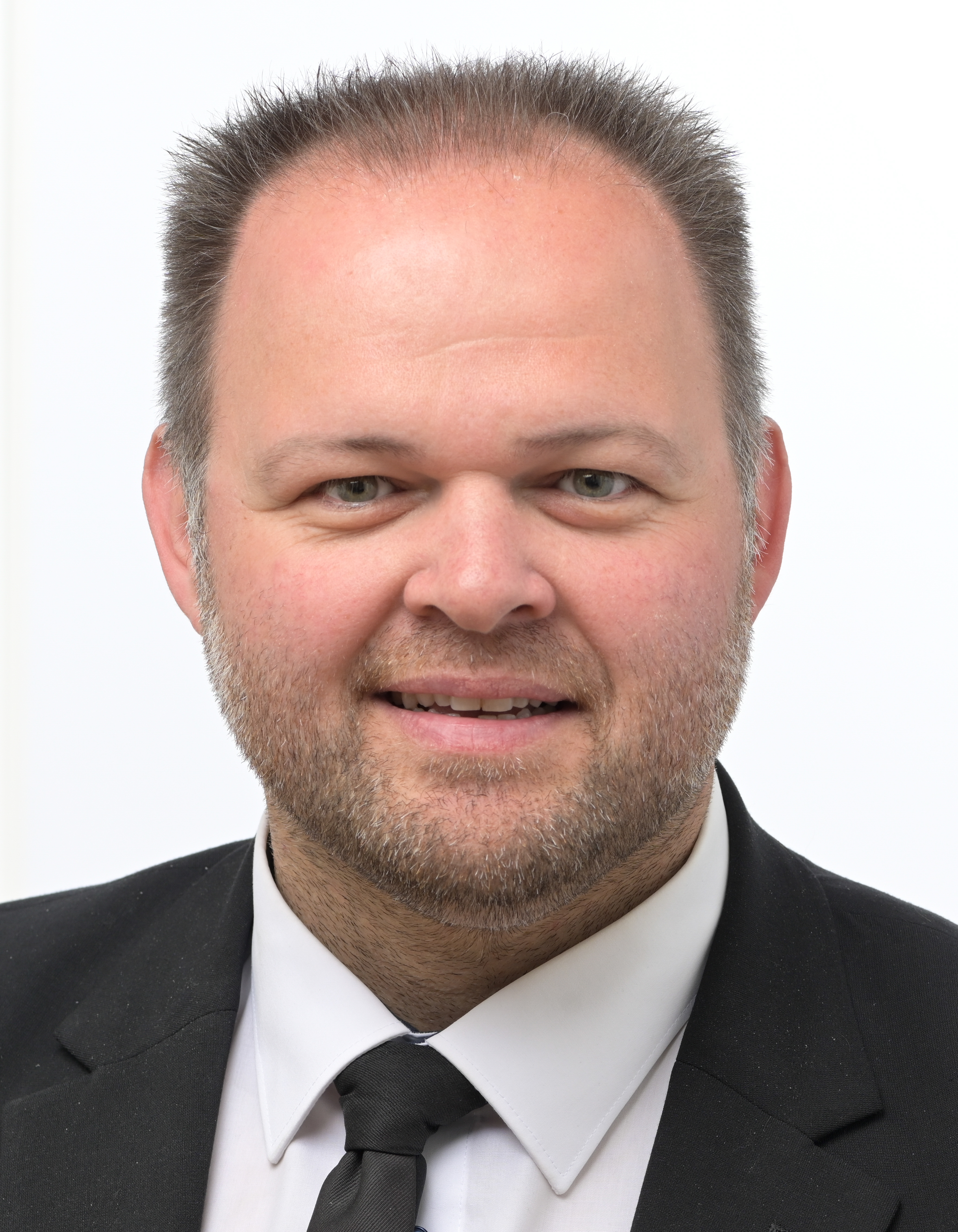
- Eroglu in 2024

Member of the European Parliament for Germany
- Incumbent
- Assumed office 2 July 2019

Personal details
- Party: Free Voters

Engin Eroglu (Turkish: Eroğlu) is a German politician who is serving as a Free Voters Member of the European Parliament.

== Professional career ==
From 2002 to 2005, Eroglu underwent apprenticeship as a bank and Sparkassen clerk at Kreissparkasse Schwalm-Eder. Following his apprenticeship, he was an employee of Sparkassen Vertriebs- und Immobilien GmbH from 2005 to 2013. In 2008, the start of his self-employment in various business sectors followed. From 2013 to 2019, Eroglu worked as an independent branch manager of Sparkassen-Immobilien-Vermittlungs-GmbH. Since 2019, he has been an active member of the European Parliament.

== Political career ==
At the age of 15, Eroglu joined Bündnis 90/Die Grünen. Between 1998 and 2012, he held the office of district chairman, Bündnis 90/Die Grünen Schwalm-Eder and left the party at the age of 29.

Since 2012, Eroglu has been a member of the Freie Wähler Hessen.

In 2013, he founded the Freie Wähler Jugend Hessen and held the office of state chairman of the youth association of the Freie Wähler from 2013 to 2017.

He served as deputy state chairman of the Freie Wähler Hessen from 2014 to 2017, until he was appointed state chairman of the Freie Wähler Hessen in 2017.

Since 2017, Eroglu has additionally served as deputy state chairman of the Freie Wähler Hessen (FWG) e. V.

In 2019, Eroglu was elected deputy federal chairman of the Free Voter Freie Wähler with 82.5%.

Since 2019, Eroglu is also a member of the European Parliament for the Freie Wähler party. He is a member of the Committee on Economic and Monetary Affairs and the Committee on Foreign Affairs of the European Parliament. He is also a member of the Delegation for EU-Turkey Relations and a member of the Delegation to the EU-Kazakhstan, EU-Kyrgyzstan, EU-Uzbekistan and EU-Tajikistan Parliamentary Cooperation Committees, as well as for Relations with Turkmenistan and Mongolia (DCAS).

In addition, he is an alternate member of the Delegation for Relations with Afghanistan.

Engin Eroglu is a member of the Renew Europe Group. Since 2019, Eroglu has been a member of the European Democratic Party (EDP) and has also served on its executive committee as a representative of the national EP delegation since 2020.

As part of his European policy, Engin Eroglu is particularly committed to the preservation of regional banking structures (Sparkassen and local cooperative banks) and often speaks critically of the human rights violations of the Chinese Communist Party regime under the general secretaryship of Xi Jinping.

In the field of trade and foreign policy, Engin Eroglu was nominated one of the 5 most influential members of the European Parliament in the Influence Index 2021, a data-based ranking by BCW Brussels and VoteWatch Europe that measures the influence of members of the European Parliament.

== Personal life ==
Born in Schwalmstadt-Ziegenhain, Eroglu is of Turkish descent.
