= 2013 Bavarian state election =

State election in Germany

- 15 September 2013

All 180 seats in the Landtag of Bavaria 91 seats needed for a majority
- Turnout: 11,812,965 (63.6%) ▲5.7%
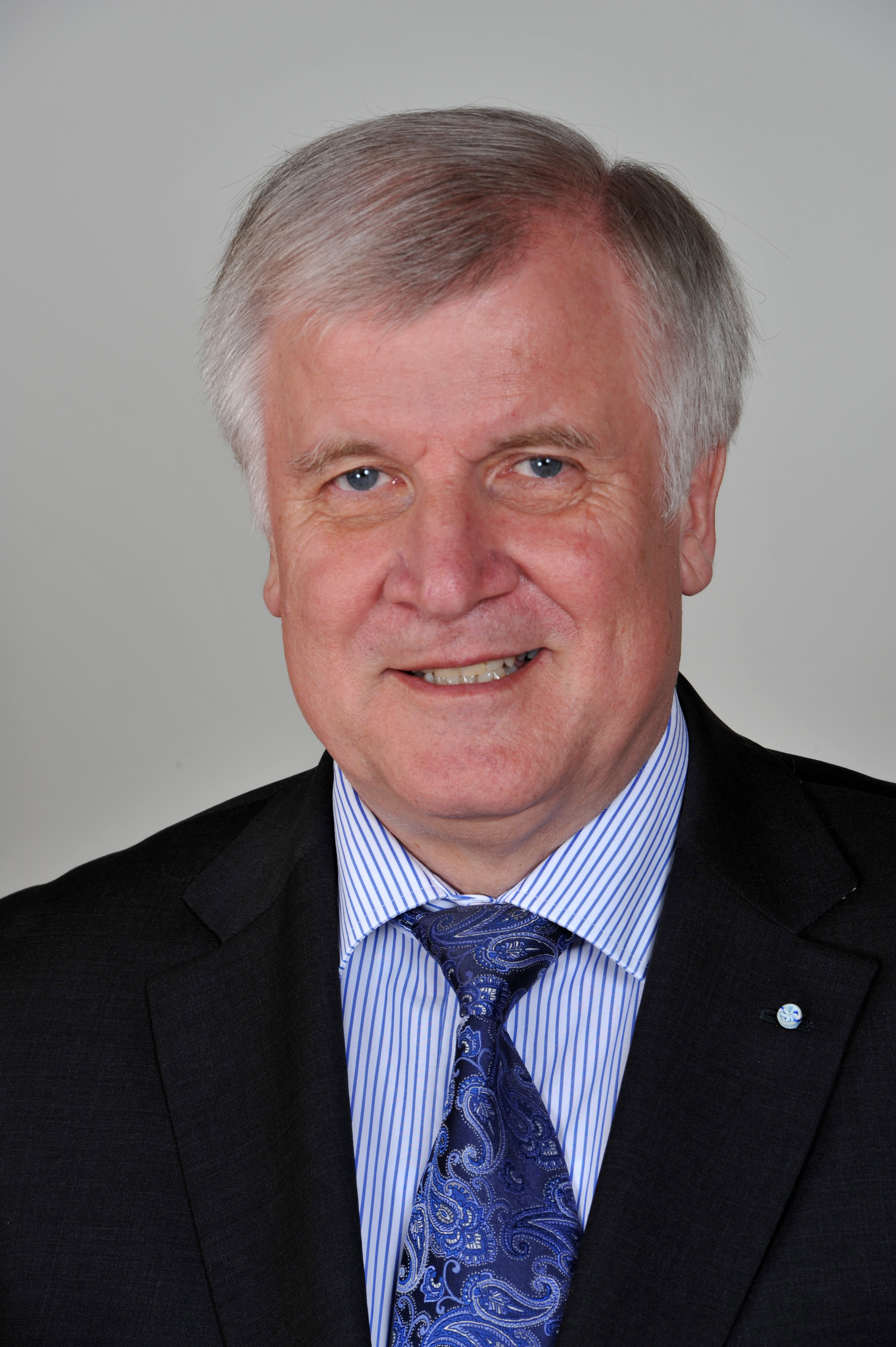

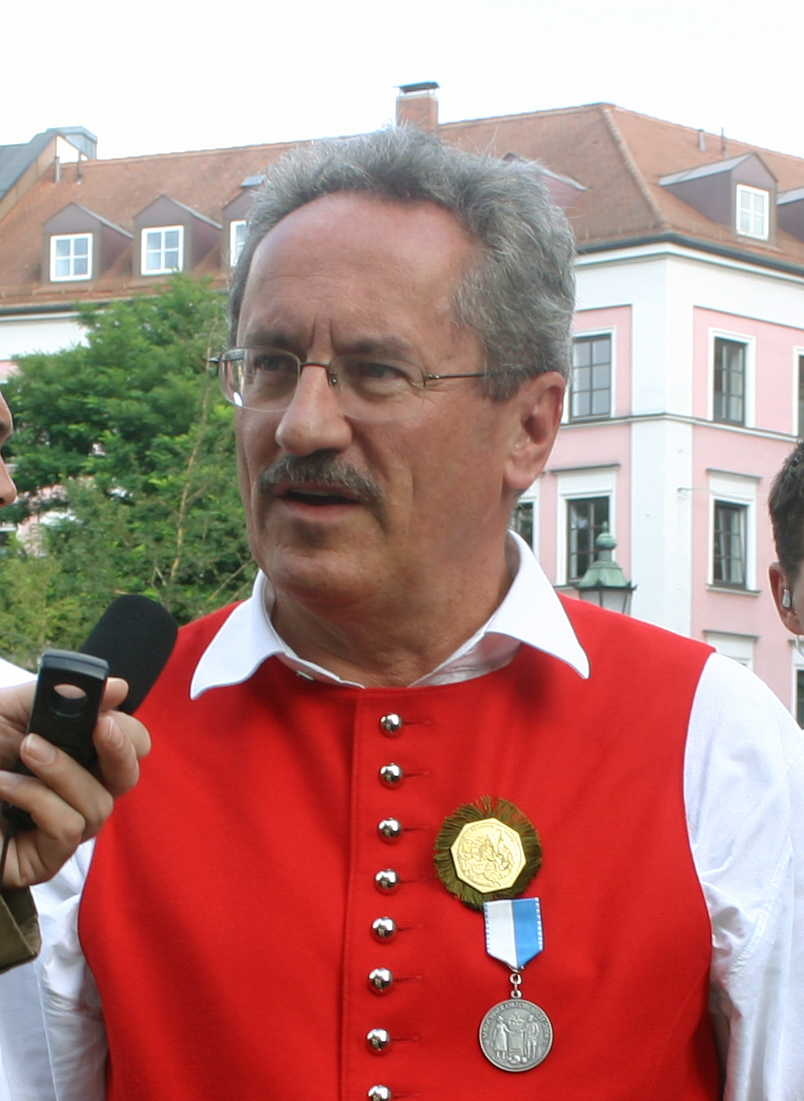

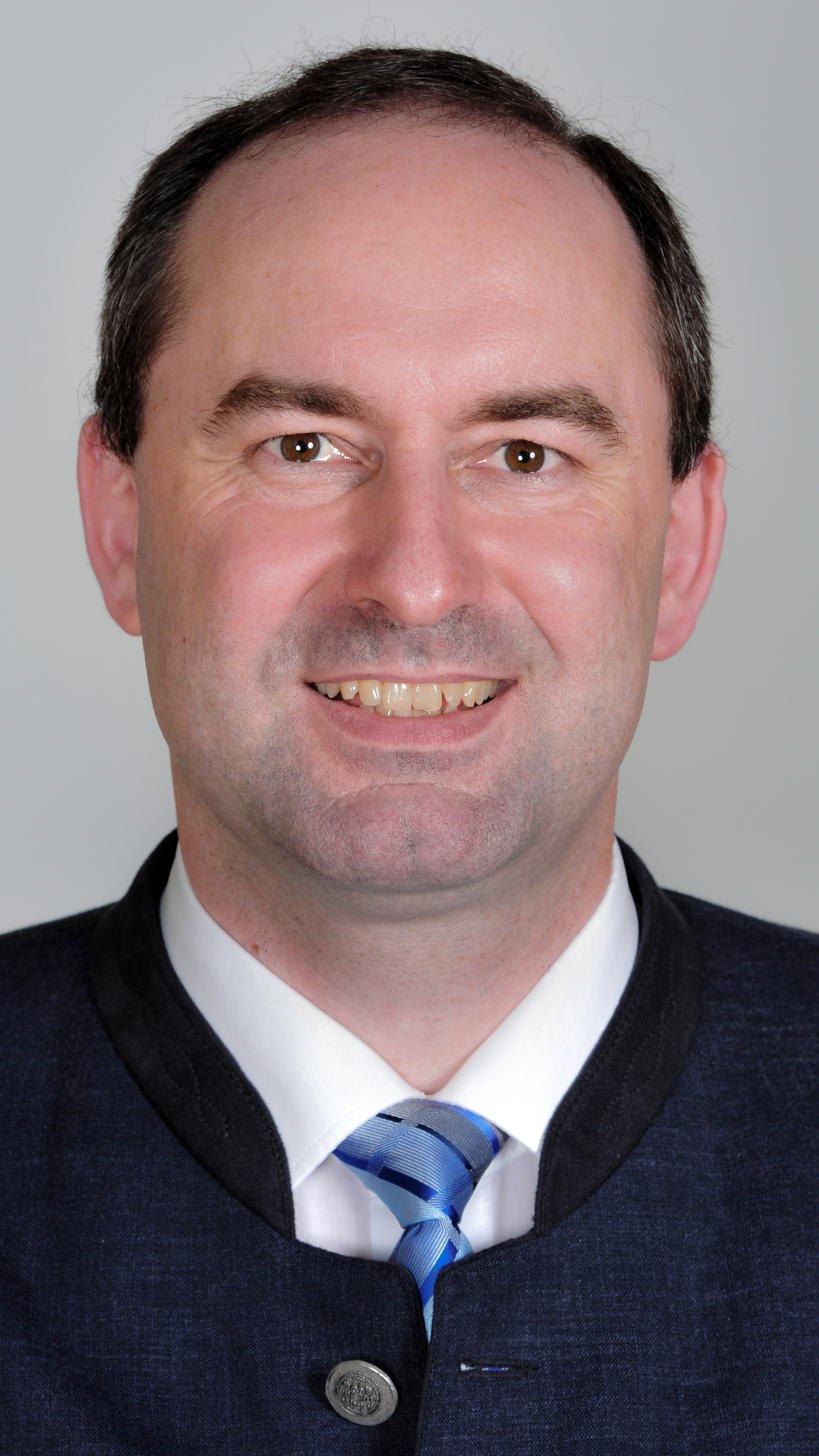

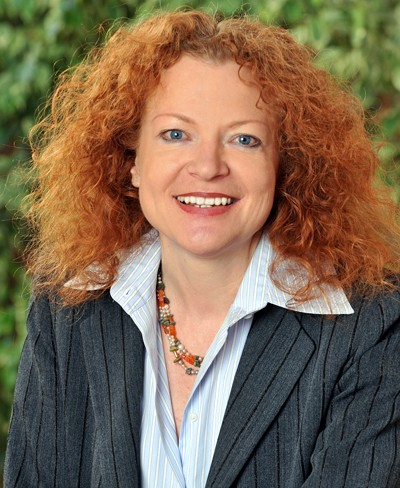
	First party	Second party
Leader	Horst Seehofer	Christian Ude
Party	CSU	SPD
Last election	92 seats, 43.4%	39 seats, 18.6%
Seats won	101	42
Seat change	▲9	▲3
Popular vote	5,632,272	2,436,515
Percentage	47.7%	20.6%
Swing	▲4.3%	▲2.0%
	Third party	Fourth party
Leader	Hubert Aiwanger	Margarete Bause
Party	FW	Greens
Last election	21 seats, 10.2%	19 seats, 9.4%
Seats won	19	18
Seat change	▼2	▼1
Popular vote	1,062,244	1,018,652
Percentage	9.0%	8.6%
Swing	▼1.2%	▼0.8%
- Results for the single-member constituencies
Minister-President before election
Horst Seehofer
CSU
Minister-President designate
Horst Seehofer
CSU

The 2013 Bavarian state election was held on 15 September 2013 to elect the 180 members of the 17th Landtag of Bavaria. It was held one week before the 2013 German federal election. The CSU regained the absolute majority it had lost in 2008, while the Free Democratic Party (FDP), a member of the outgoing governing coalition, fell below the 5% electoral threshold and lost all its seats. Minister-President Horst Seehofer continued in office.

This election was the last election in which a single party got an absolute majority in a state parliament until the 2022 Saarland state election. The CSU previously held an absolute majority, and therefore governed alone, from 1966 to 2008 and again from 2013 to 2018. Previously, even in the late 1990s, it was common that either the CDU/CSU or the SPD got an absolute majority in a state election. For example, this happened in Brandenburg in 1994, 1998 in Lower Saxony and 1999 in Saxony.

== Parties ==
The table below lists parties represented in the 16th Landtag of Bavaria.

Name		Ideology	Leader(s)	2008 result	
Name		Ideology	Leader(s)	Votes (%)	Seats
CSU	Christian Social Union in Bavaria; Christlich-Soziale Union in Bayern	Christian democracy	Horst Seehofer	43.4%	92 / 187
SPD	Social Democratic Party of Germany; Sozialdemokratische Partei Deutschlands	Social democracy	Christian Ude	18.6%	39 / 187
FW	Free Voters of Bavaria; Freie Wähler Bayern	Regionalism	Hubert Aiwanger	10.2%	21 / 187
Grüne	Alliance 90/The Greens; Bündnis 90/Die Grünen	Green politics	Margarete Bause	9.4%	19 / 187
FDP	Free Democratic Party; Freie Demokratische Partei	Classical liberalism	Martin Zeil	8.0%	16 / 187

== Opinion polling ==
Polling firm	Fieldwork date	Sample size	CSU	SPD	FW	Grüne	FDP	Linke	Piraten	Others	Lead
2013 state election	15 Sep 2013	–	47.7	20.6	9.0	8.6	3.3	2.1	2.0	6.7	27.1
Emnid	4–5 Sep 2013	~1,000	47	18	8	12	4	4	3	4	29
Forschungsgruppe Wahlen	3–5 Sep 2013	1,010	48	20	8	10	4	–	–	10	28
Infratest dimap	3–5 Sep 2013	1,006	47	21	7	11	3	3	–	8	26
GMS	30 Aug – 2 Sep 2013	1,009	47	18	8	13	5	3	2	4	29
Emnid	23–24 Aug 2013	1,000	48	18	8	13	4	3	3	3	30
Infratest dimap	11–15 Jul 2013	1,004	47	18	8	15	3	3	–	6	29
GMS	8–10 Jul 2013	1,007	47	19	10	11	5	2	2	4	28
Emnid	4–6 Jul 2013	1,000	47	19	9	11	5	3	3	3 (Note: 1% AfD, 2% Other)	28
Forschungsgruppe Wahlen	10–12 Jun 2013	1,009	46	20	10	13	4	–	–	7	26
GMS	3–10 Jun 2013	1,309	46	20	9	11	4	3	2	5	26
Forsa	8–25 May 2013	1,102	46	20	9	12	4	3	2	5	26
GMS	28–30 Apr 2013	1,008	47	20	8	13	3	2	2	5	27
INSA	15–17 Apr 2013	1,005	49	18	9	16	2	2	–	4	31
GMS	4–15 Feb 2013	1,004	48	21	8	12	3	3	2	?	27
TNS Infratest	28 Jan – 6 Feb 2013	1,001	46	19	8	15	3	2	3	4	27
Emnid	5–7 Feb 2013	1,001	48	20	9	12	3	2	3	?	28
Emnid	?	?	48	20	8	12	3	3	3	?	28
Forsa	17 Dec 2012–8 Jan 2013	1,119	46	18	9	13	3	4	2	5	28
Infratest dimap	3–7 Jan 2013	1,000	47	19	9	14	3	2	3	3	28
GMS	4–7 Dec 2012	1,100	49	22	8	10	4	?	4	?	27
GMS	22–30 Oct 2012	?	48	20	8	10	5	2	4	?	28
GMS	16–18 Oct 2012	1,007	48	20	8	10	5	2	4	3	28
Emnid	26 Sep – 10 Oct 2012	1,001	48	21	8	10	4	2	4	3	27
Emnid	?	?	47	21	9	10	3	2	5	3	26
Emnid	27–30 Jul 2012	1,000	46	20	8	12	3	2	6	3	26
GMS	June 2012	1,000	46	19	6/8 (Note: The results of the poll differ between sources, and were not confirmed by the publisher.)	10	4	?	9/7 (Note: The results of the poll differ between sources, and were not confirmed by the publisher.)	?	27
Forsa	21–29 Jun 2012	1,150	43	23	9	11	2	2	6	4	20
Emnid	20–21 Jun 2012	1,000	44	22	6	13	3	1	7	4	22
Emnid	16–18 Apr 2012	1,000	46	20	7	12	2	2	8	3	26
Emnid	15–20 Mar 2012	1,001	46	20	8	13	2	2	5	4	26
Infratest dimap	2–3 Jan 2012	1,000	44	21	8	14	3	2	4	4	23
GMS	30 Dec 2011–3 Jan 2012	1,002	42	22	9	12	2	2	5	6	20
Emnid	December 2012	1,000	44	21	9	13	2	2	5	?	23
Forsa	26 Oct – 25 Nov 2011	1,002	41	24	9	10	3	3	6	4 (Note: 1% BP, 3% Other)	17
Emnid	September 2011	?	43	20	9	17	2	3	–	6	23
Emnid	31 Aug – 1 Sep 2011	1,000	44	18	9	18	4	?	–	?	26
Forsa	15–26 Aug 2011	1,007	41	21	10	16	3	4	–	5	20
GMS	6–8 Jun 2011	1,002	42	19	6	18	4	4	–	7	23
Emnid	6–8 Jun 2011	1,000	45	15	8	20	4	4	–	4	25
Emnid	11–17 Mar 2011	1,000	46	17	7	17	4	4	–	5	29
Forsa	4–14 Jan 2011	1,048	40	16	10	20	4	4	–	6	20
Infratest dimap	6–10 Jan 2011	1,000	46	17	4	17	6	4	1	5	29
Emnid	10–12 Dec 2010	1,001	45	18	6	16	5	5	–	5	27
Infratest dimap	7–12 Jan 2010	1,001	41	17	6	15	11	3	–	5	24
2009 federal election	27 Sep 2009	–	42.6	16.8	?	10.8	14.7	6.5	?	8.6	25.8
Infratest dimap	8–11 Jan 2009	1,000	45	17	10	11	10	3	–	4	28
GMS	4–5 Jan 2009	1,002	45	19	8	10	8	4	–	6	26
GMS	12–17 Dec 2008	1,002	45	19	8	10	8	4	–	6	26
2008 state election	28 Sep 2008	–	43.4	18.6	10.2	9.4	8.0	4.3	–	6.1 (Note: 2.0% ÖDP, 1.4% REP, 2.7% Other)	24.8

== Election result ==
The CSU regained an absolute majority of the seats, which they had lost in the 2008 election after 50 years of single-party government. The FDP, which had governed with the CSU since 2008, fell below the 5% threshold and lost all its seats. SPD, the Greens and Free Voters remained in opposition. A record number of 14.1% of the votes cast went unrepresented in the Landtag because of the 5% threshold.

Summary of the 15 September 2013 election results for the Landtag of Bavaria
Party	Votes	%	+/–	Seats	+/–
Christian Social Union (CSU)	5,632,272	47.68	+4.3	101	+9
Social Democratic Party (SPD)	2,436,515	20.63	+2.0	42	+3
Free Voters of Bavaria (FW)	1,062,244	8.99	-1.2	19	-2
Alliance 90/The Greens (Grüne)	1,018,652	8.62	-0.8	18	-1
Free Democratic Party (FDP)	389,584	3.30	-4.7	0	-16
The Left (Linke)	251,086	2.13	-2.2	0	±0
Bavaria Party (BP)	247,282	2.09	+1.0	0	±0
Ecological Democratic Party (ÖDP)	239,235	2.03	±0.0	0	±0
Pirate Party Germany (Piraten)	234,221	1.98	New	0	New
The Republicans (REP)	117,633	1.00	-0.4	0	±0
Party For Franconia	87,237	0.74	New	0	New
National Democratic Party (NPD)	74,895	0.63	±0.0	0	±0
Others	22,019	0.19	-0.2	0	±0
Total	11,812,875	100.00	–	180	–

Popular vote
CSU	47.68%
SPD	20.63%
FW	8.99%
B'90/GRÜNE	8.62%
FDP	3.30%
DIE LINKE	2.13%
Others	8.65%

Seats
CSU	56.11%
SPD	23.33%
FW	10.55%
B'90/GRÜNE	10.00%
