= 2023 Bavarian state election =

German state election

- 8 October 2023

All 203 seats in the Landtag of Bavaria (including 23 overhang and leveling seats) 102 seats needed for a majority
- Turnout: 6,902,684 (73.3%) ▲1.1%
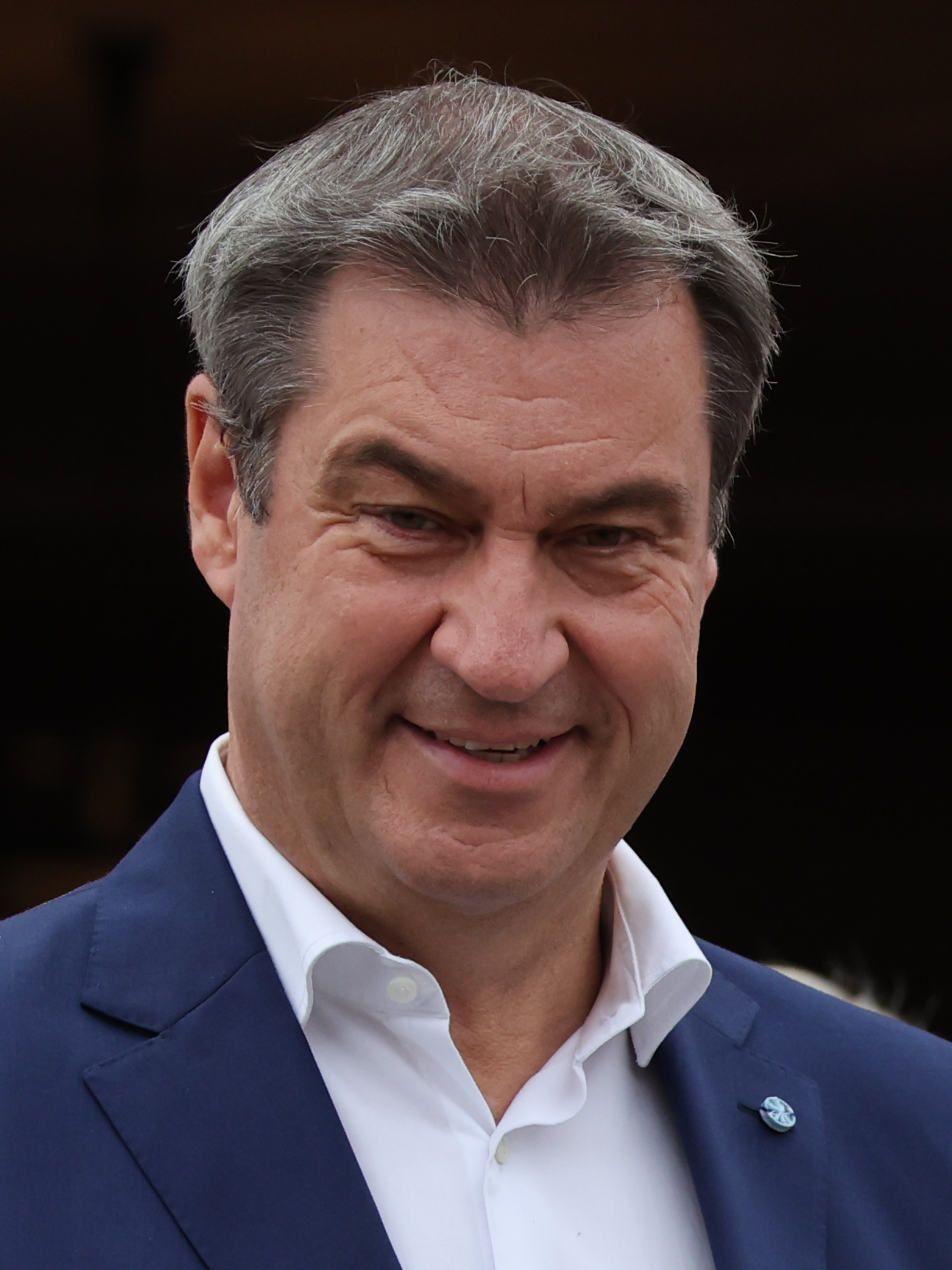

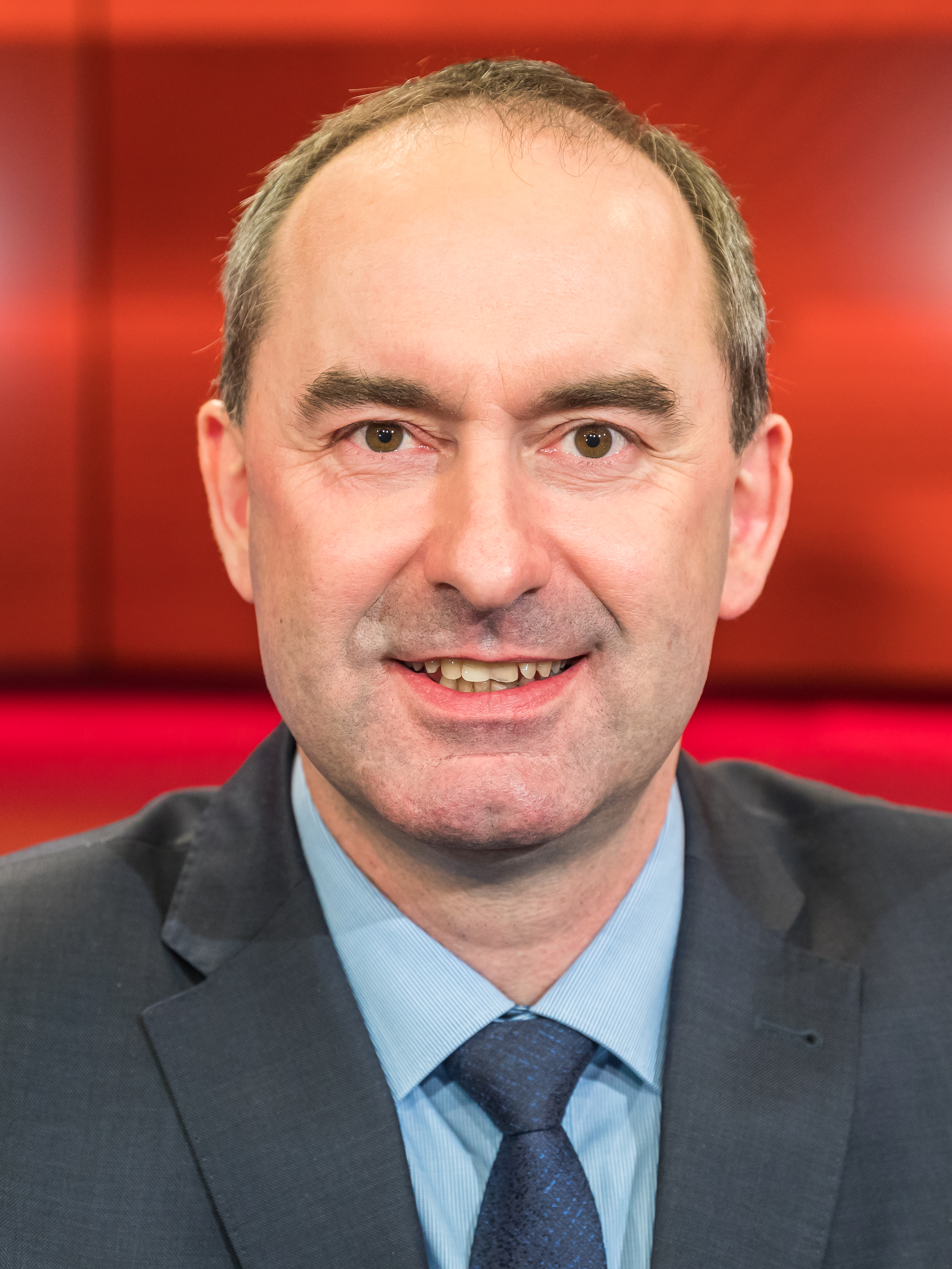

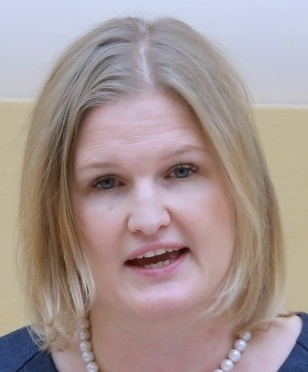

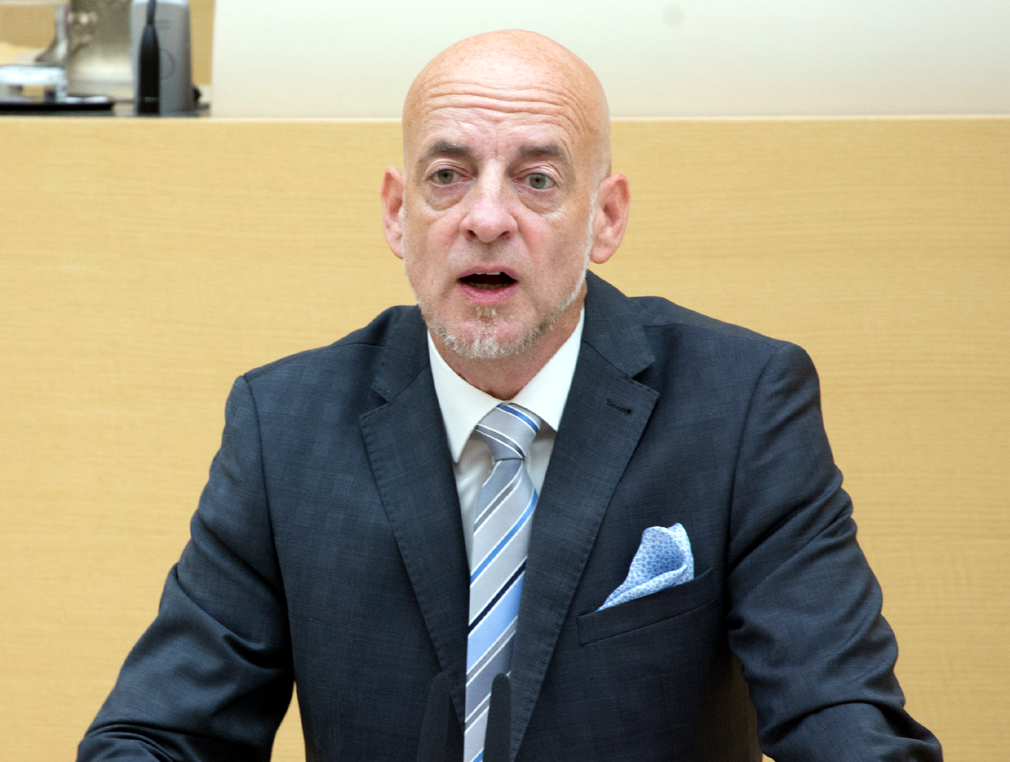

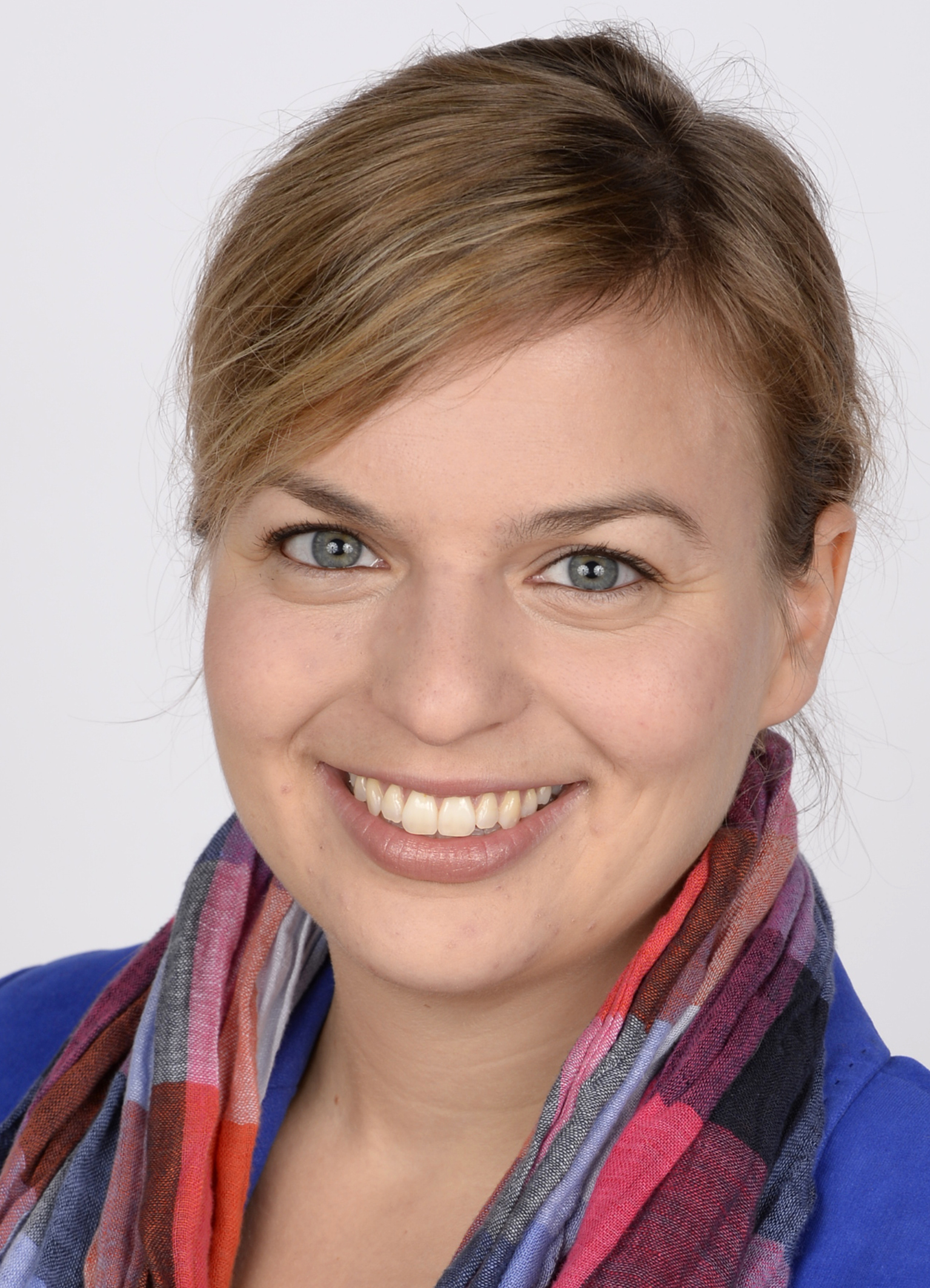

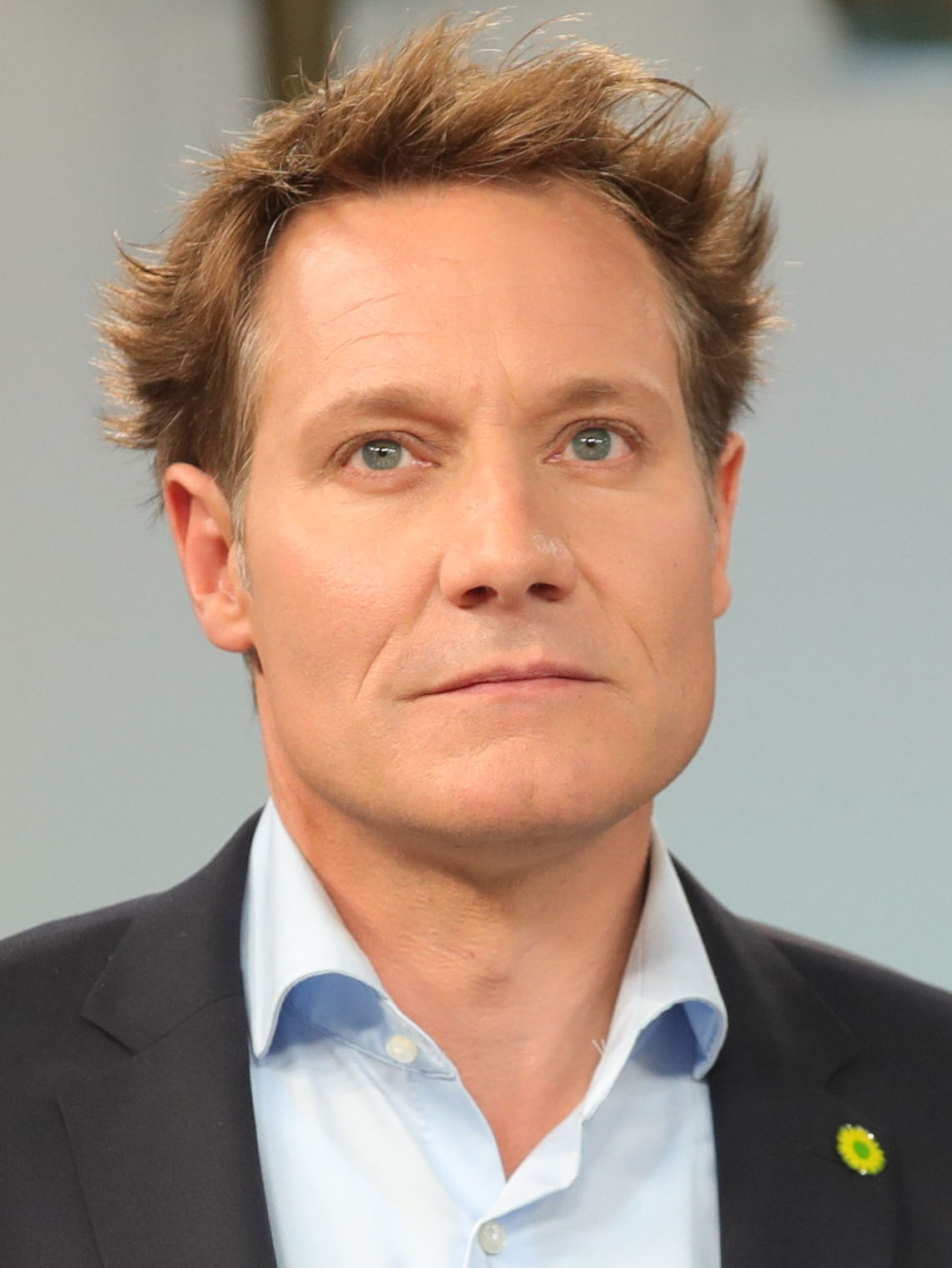

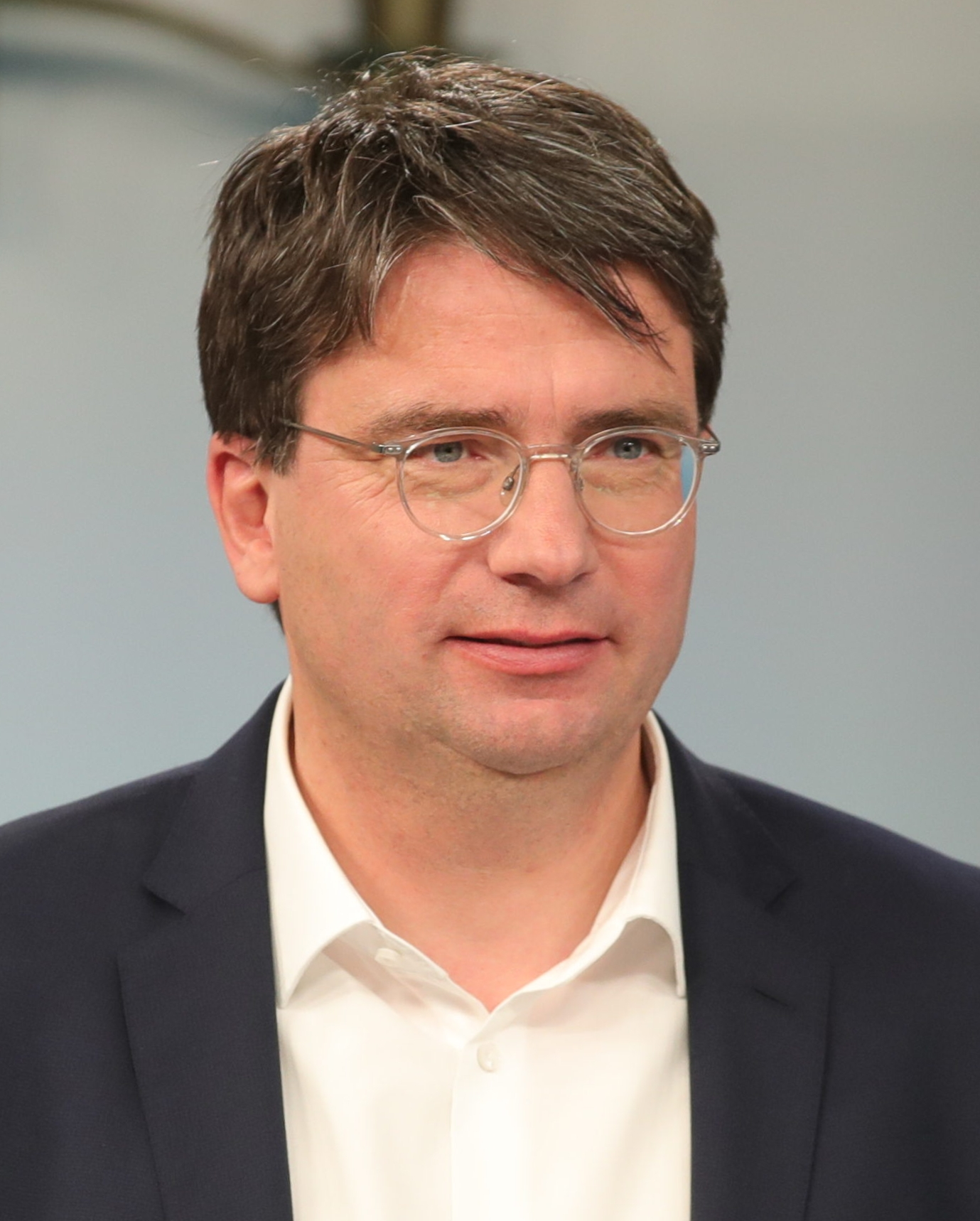

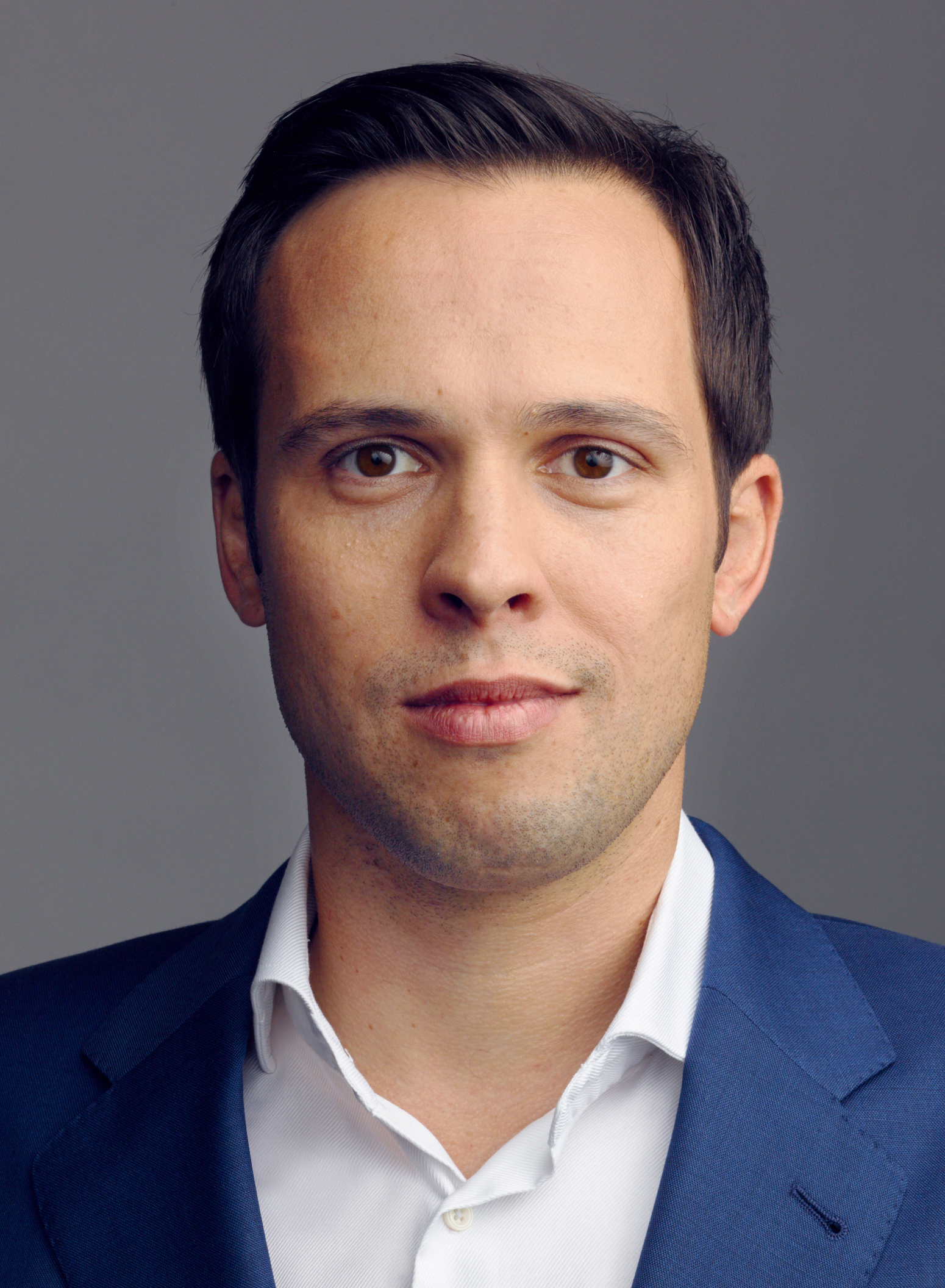
	First party	Second party	Third party
Leader	Markus Söder	Hubert Aiwanger	Katrin Ebner-Steiner; Martin Böhm
Party	CSU	FW	AfD
Last election	85 seats, 37.2%	27 seats, 11.6%	22 seats, 10.2%
Seats won	85	37	32
Seat change	Steady	▲10	▲10
Popular vote	5,059,571	2,163,849	2,000,435
Percentage	37.0%	15.8%	14.6%
Swing	▼0.2%	▲4.3%	▲4.4%
	Fourth party	Fifth party	Sixth party
Leader	Katharina Schulze; Ludwig Hartmann	Florian von Brunn	Martin Hagen
Party	Greens	SPD	FDP
Last election	38 seats, 17.6%	22 seats, 9.7%	11 seats, 5.1%
Seats won	32	17	0
Seat change	▼6	▼5	▼11
Popular vote	1,972,725	1,140,753	413,887
Percentage	14.4%	8.4%	3.0%
Swing	▼3.2%	▼1.3%	▼2.1%
- Map of the election, showing the winner of each single-member district and the distribution of list seats in the constituencies.
Government before election
Second Söder cabinet
CSU—FW
Government after election
Third Söder cabinet
CSU—FW

The 2023 Bavarian state election was held on 8 October 2023 to elect the members of the 19th Landtag of Bavaria. The outgoing government was a coalition of the Christian Social Union in Bavaria (CSU) and the Free Voters of Bavaria (FW) led by Minister-President of Bavaria Markus Söder. The 2023 Hessian state election was held on same day.

The CSU remained the largest party with only a slight decline to 37%. The Free Voters improved to second place with 16%, their best result to date. The opposition Alternative for Germany (AfD) was a close third on 15%. The Greens declined to 14%, followed by the Social Democratic Party (SPD) at a historic low of 8%. The Free Democratic Party (FDP) fell to 3% and lost their seats.

Overall, the incumbent coalition increased its majority thanks to the Free Voters' gains. The result, amidst a campaign dominated by federal issues such as immigration, was perceived as a blow for the federal government, with its three member parties – the SPD, Greens, and FDP – all suffering losses. The results also indicated the increasing popularity of the far-right AfD, which in previous months had moved into second place in federal opinion polling.

== Election organisation ==
=== Election date and preparation deadlines ===
According to the Bavarian Constitution, the election must be held on a Sunday "at the earliest 59 months, at the latest 62 months" after the preceding state election unless the Landtag is dissolved early, in this case the new election shall be held at the latest on the sixth Sunday after the dissolution. The preceding state election took place on 14 October 2018. This would allow an election date between 17 September and 10 December 2023. The elections since 1978 have always taken place between mid-September and mid-October. The Bavarian state government proposed 8 October 2023 as the election date on 15 November 2022 and officially set it on 13 December 2022 after hearing the parties to the state parliament. At the same day elections of the Bezirktags, two District Administrators and some Mayors take place.

The deadline for determining the population figures, which are decisive for the distribution of the 180 Landtag mandates among the seven Bavarian administrative districts and possible changes of the electoral districts, was 14 July 2021 (33 months after the election of the previous Landtag). On this basis, the Bavarian Ministry of the Interior had to submit a constituency report to the Landtag until 36 months after the election. This was done on 12 October 2021.

Delegates to the internal meetings of the parties can be appointed at the earliest 43 months after the preceding election, i.e. 15 May 2022. The actual district candidates are eligible at the earliest 46 months after the preceding election, i.e. 15 August 2022. The parties and other organised electoral groups which have not been represented continuously in the Bavarian Landtag or in the German Bundestag since their last election on the basis of their own election proposals (CDU, CSU, SPD, Free Voters of Bavaria, Alliance 90/The Greens, FDP, Die Linke, AfD) have to notify their intention to participate to the State Election Commissioner by the 90th day before the election. The actual election proposals and any necessary signatures have to be submitted by the 73rd day before the election.

=== Electoral system ===
The Landtag is elected using mixed-member proportional representation. Every voter has two votes, one for a candidate in their local constituency and one for a candidate in their regional district. Both votes are taken into account in the allocation of seats according to proportional representation. The election law was changed in 2022 to use the Sainte-Laguë method. There is no state-wide proportional representation; regional seats are allocated within the seven administrative districts, which are referred to as "constituencies" (Wahlkreise) in the constitution. The regional seats are allocated in an open-list fashion, according to votes cast for candidates.

Only parties and electoral groups that win at least 5% of the total votes across Bavaria (sum of first and second votes, meaning party votes and local district contest votes) participate in the allocation of seats. The regional "constituencies" are divided into local "electoral districts" (Stimmkreise), in each of which one MP is directly elected by getting plurality in the first (only) round.

The number of local "electoral districts" (91) is about equal to the number of seats in the regional "constituencies" (89). In addition, 23 seats may be allocated as levelling seats or to compensate for overhang.

== Campaign ==
=== Free Voters ===
In August 2023, the Süddeutsche Zeitung reported on a pamphlet with antisemitic contents that Hubert Aiwanger may have authored and distributed at his high school some 35 years ago as a 17-year-old. Aiwanger admitted to carrying copies in his satchel but denied writing the document. His older brother, a student at the same school at the time, later took responsibility for writing the antisemitic pamphlet itself. The Süddeutsche Zeitung drew some criticism for publishing the story six weeks before the election, without conclusive evidence and without talking to Aiwanger before publication. Bavarian premier Markus Söder demanded that Aiwanger answer 25 questions on the matter, including whether Aiwainger had actively distributed the antisemitic pamphlet. Aiwanger claimed multiple times to "not remember". Aiwanger's responses were heavily criticised as short and evasive.

In his response to a question about other incidents, Aiwanger shortly mentioned that he remembers an unrelated incident in the arts class and noted a caution against breach of secrecy.

Despite the story, Aiwanger's party, Free Voters, saw an increase in support in the polls.

=== AfD ===
On 4 October 2023, Tino Chrupalla was at an election campaign appearance in Ingolstadt. Before his speech he collapsed and came to the intensive care unit of a local hospital. What exactly led to the hospitalisation is unclear.

== Parties ==
The table below lists parties represented in the 18th Landtag of Bavaria.

Name		Leaders	Ideology	2018 result		2023
Name		Leaders	Ideology	Votes (%)	Seats	Seats
CSU	Christian Social Union in Bavaria; Christlich-Soziale Union in Bayern	Markus Söder	Christian democracy	37.2%	85 / 205	82 / 205
Grüne	Alliance 90/The Greens; Bündnis 90/Die Grünen	Thomas von Sarnowski; Eva Lettenbauer	Green politics	17.6%	38 / 205	38 / 205
FW	Free Voters of Bavaria; Freie Wähler Bayern	Hubert Aiwanger	Conservatism	11.6%	27 / 205	27 / 205
AfD	Alternative for Germany; Alternative für Deutschland	Stephan Protschka	German nationalism Right-wing populism	10.2%	22 / 205	17 / 205
SPD	Social Democratic Party of Germany; Sozialdemokratische Partei Deutschlands	Florian von Brunn; Ronja Endres	Social democracy	9.7%	22 / 205	21 / 205
FDP	Free Democratic Party; Freie Demokratische Partei	Martin Hagen	Classical liberalism	5.1%	11 / 205	12 / 205
Independents		-	-	-	0 / 205	8 / 205

== Opinion polls ==
=== Graphical summary ===
LOESS graph

=== Party polling ===
Polling firm	Fieldwork date	Sample size	CSU	Grüne	FW	AfD	SPD	FDP	Linke	Lead
2023 state election	8 Oct 2023	–	37.0	14.4	15.8	14.6	8.4	3.0	1.5	21.2
Wahlkreisprognose	3–6 Oct 2023	985	37.5	15.5	15	14	8	3	1	22
Forschungsgruppe Wahlen	4–5 Oct 2023	1,209	37	16	15	14	9	3	–	21
Wahlkreisprognose	30 Sep – 3 Oct 2023	1,002	37	15	15	14	7.5	4	1.5	22
INSA	25 Sep – 2 Oct 2023	1,000	36	15	15	14	9	4	2	21
Civey	24 Sep – 1 Oct 2023	2,121	37	15	15	14	9	4	1	22
Forschungsgruppe Wahlen	25–28 Sep 2023	1,222	36	16	15	14	9	4	–	20
Infratest dimap	25–27 Sep 2023	1,512	36	15	16	14	9	4	–	20
Wahlkreisprognose	14–20 Sep 2023	1,021	37	15	17.5	13.5	8.5	3	1	19.5
Civey	13–20 Sep 2023	5,002	38	14	14	13	9	4	2	24
GMS	13–18 Sep 2023	1,004	36	14	17	14	9	3	1	19
Infratest dimap	5–9 Sep 2023	1,171	36	15	17	13	9	3	–	19
Forschungsgruppe Wahlen	4–7 Sep 2023	1,254	36	16	16	12	9	4	–	20
Wahlkreisprognose	4–7 Sep 2023	1,004	41	13.5	15.5	15	6.5	3.5	1	25.5
GMS	4–6 Sep 2023	1,003	38	13	16	14	8	4	1	22
Civey	30 Aug – 6 Sep 2023	5,003	36	15	12	17	10	4	1	19
INSA	1–5 Sep 2023	1,000	37	14	15	14	9	4	2	22
Wahlkreisprognose	31 Aug – 4 Sep 2023	1,400	42	12.5	11.5	15	10	4	1	27
Civey	9–23 Aug 2023	5,502	38	15	12	13	10	4	2	23
Wahlkreisprognose	14–19 Aug 2023	1,892	37	12.5	13.5	18	11	3	1	19
Civey	26 Jul – 9 Aug 2023	5,505	39	16	11	12	11	4	2	23
GMS	2–8 Aug 2023	1,002	39	14	12	14	9	4	3	25
Wahlkreisprognose	27–31 Jul 2023	1,042	40	13.5	10.5	16.5	10	3	0.5	23.5
Forsa	24–28 Jul 2023	1,012	39	14	14	13	9	4	2	25
INSA	17–24 Jul 2023	1,000	38	15	11	14	11	5	2	23
Civey	30 Jun – 14 Jul 2023	5,500	38	17	12	11	12	3	2	21
Wahlkreisprognose	29 Jun – 4 Jul 2023	1,300	39	14.5	10.5	16	9	4	1.5	23
GMS	28 Jun – 3 Jul 2023	1,006	40	15	12	13	9	4	2	25
Civey	2–6 Jun 2023	5,501	40	16	11	10	11	4	2	24
GMS	31 May – 5 Jun 2023	1,001	41	14	11	12	10	4	2	27
Wahlkreisprognose	21–24 May 2023	1,100	41	12.5	12	12	10	6	1.5	28.5
INSA	16–22 May 2023	1,000	40	15	11	12	11	5	2	25
Infratest dimap	9–13 May 2023	1,176	39	16	12	12	11	4	–	23
Civey	28 Apr – 12 May 2023	5,503	43	17	10	9	10	3	2	26
GMS	26 Apr – 2 May 2023	1,005	41	16	9	10	11	4	3	25
Forsa	20–28 Apr 2023	1,009	41	15	10	10	10	4	2	26
Civey	1 May – 14 May 2023	5,503	42	17	10	9	10	4	2	25
Wahlkreisprognose	31 Mar – 6 Apr 2023	1,000	44	14.5	12	9.5	7.5	5	1	29.5
INSA	27 Mar – 3 Apr 2023	1,000	40	18	9	11	10	5	2	22
Civey	3–17 Mar 2023	5,502	41	18	10	9	10	4	1	23
Wahlkreisprognose	14–19 Feb 2023	1,008	43	17.5	12	10	6	4	1	25.5
Forsa	8–16 Feb 2023	1,022	42	16	10	9	10	3	–	26
Civey	2–16 Feb 2023	5,503	39	18	12	10	9	4	2	21
Wahlkreisprognose	13–17 Jan 2023	1,040	43	17.5	13	8	8	4	1	25.5
Civey	29 Dec – 12 Jan 2023	5,499	42	17	10	9	9	4	3	25
Infratest dimap	4–9 Jan 2023	1,190	38	18	10	13	9	4	–	20
INSA	2–9 Jan 2023	1,000	40	19	10	10	10	5	2	21
GMS	28 Dec 2022–3 Jan 2023	1,003	41	18	10	10	9	4	2	23
Civey	2–16 Dec 2022	5,502	40	16	12	11	9	3	2	24
Wahlkreisprognose	2–5 Dec 2022	1,944	43	17.5	11.5	12	7	4	1	25.5
Civey	6–20 Nov 2022	5,501	41	17	10	10	10	3	2	24
Wahlkreisprognose	29 Oct–3 Nov 2022	1,040	42	19	11.5	11	6	5.5	1	23
GMS	19–25 Oct 2022	1,002	39	18	10	13	9	4	2	21
Forsa	17–25 Oct 2022	1,083	41	18	11	8	10	3	2	23
INSA	10–17 Oct 2022	1,000	39	20	9	10	10	6	2	19
Civey	30 Sep – 14 Oct 2022	5,501	39	21	11	9	10	4	1	18
Infratest dimap	7–11 Oct 2022	1,157	37	18	11	12	10	3	–	19
GMS	14–20 Sep 2022	1,004	40	18	10	11	8	6	2	22
Civey	3–17 Sep 2022	5,511	40	19	9	9	10	4	2	21
Wahlkreisprognose	6–13 Sept 2022	1,371	42	21	8	8	6	8	2	21
Civey	29 Jul – 12 Aug 2022	5,501	37	20	10	9	10	5	2	17
Wahlkreisprognose	1–3 Aug 2022	1,100	41	22	9.5	6	11	5	1	19
Civey	1–15 Jul 2022	5,505	38	22	10	8	9	5	2	16
Wahlkreisprognose	22–29 Jun 2022	1,000	39.5	18.5	10	7	12	6	1	21
INSA	20–27 Jun 2022	1,000	37	20	10	9	10	7	2	17
GMS	15–20 Jun 2022	1,002	40	20	9	8	9	5	2	20
Civey	3–17 Jun 2022	5,501	39	19	9	8	11	6	2	20
Forsa	23 May–3 Jun 2022	1,049	40	20	10	7	9	6	1	20
Civey	29 Apr – 13 May 2022	2,458	36	18	9	8	15	6	2	18
Forsa	27 Apr–13 May 2022	1,235	39	20	11	6	10	5	2	19
Wahlkreisprognose	27 Apr–3 May 2022	1,053	40	15	7	7	16	7	2	24
GMS	20–25 Apr 2022	1,005	38	16	8	9	13	7	3	22
Civey	1–15 Apr 2022	3,009	35	18	10	6	15	8	2	17
GMS	23–28 Feb 2022	1,002	37	15	8	9	13	8	4	22
Wahlkreisprognose	18–23 Feb 2022	1,700	36.5	15	8	9	16	7	2	20.5
Infratest dimap	13–17 Jan 2022	1,171	36	16	8	10	14	7	–	20
GMS	29 Dec 2021–3 Jan 2022	1,005	35	15	8	10	14	9	2	20
Wahlkreisprognose	8–14 Dec 2021	1,430	33.5	16.5	11	8	16.5	8	2	17
INSA	4–11 Oct 2021	1,000	32	15	8	8	20	11	2	12
2021 federal election	26 Sep 2021	–	31.7	14.1	7.5	9.0	18.0	10.5	2.8	13.7
GMS	21–27 Jul 2021	1,003	39	20	9	8	9	7	3	19
INSA	12–19 Jul 2021	1,000	37	22	10	8	10	8	3	16
Forsa	10–17 May 2021	1,016	38	22	9	9	7	6	3	16
INSA	22–27 Apr 2021	1,400	36	24	9	9	9	7	3	12
GMS	24–29 Mar 2021	1,005	40	20	9	9	8	6	3	20
Wahlkreisprognose	13–18 Mar 2021	–	37	20	12	7.5	10	6	3	17
GMS	10–15 Feb 2021	1,003	47	18	8	8	8	4	3	29
INSA	21–26 Jan 2021	1,016	46	18	8	7	9	5	3	28
Infratest dimap	7–11 Jan 2021	1,000	48	19	8	7	7	3	3	29
GMS	29 Dec 2020–4 Jan 2021	1,005	48	18	7	8	8	4	2	30
Wahlkreisprognose	6–13 Nov 2020	–	47	18	8	8	6	4	3	29
GMS	4–9 Nov 2020	1,004	46	18	6	8	8	4	3	28
GMS	7–12 Oct 2020	1,003	46	19	7	8	8	4	3	27
Infratest dimap	30 Sep–5 Oct 2020	1,001	45	21	7	8	8	3	3	24
Wahlkreisprognose	27–31 Aug 2020	–	46	18	10	8	6.5	4	3.5	28
GMS	17–20 Aug 2020	1,005	47	18	6	7	9	3	3	29
Wahlkreisprognose	11–14 Aug 2020	–	43	21	9	7.5	9.5	4	2	22
INSA	5–10 Aug 2020	1,001	47	18	7	7	10	3	3	29
GMS	22–27 Jul 2020	1,004	49	19	5	7	7	3	3	30
Infratest dimap	15–22 Jul 2020	1,003	49	20	5	7	7	3	3	29
Wahlkreisprognose	11–16 Jun 2020	–	50	16	9	5	8	5	2	34
GMS	9–16 Jun 2020	1,002	48	16	8	6	9	4	3	32
Infratest dimap	20–25 May 2020	1,000	48	19	8	5	9	3	3	29
INSA	19–25 May 2020	1,014	46	17	8	7	10	4	3	29
GMS	28 Apr–4 May 2020	1,006	47	15	9	7	10	3	3	32
Wahlkreisprognose	20–23 Apr 2020	–	50	13.5	8	6.5	11	4	2.5	36.5
Wahlkreisprognose	4–8 Apr 2020	–	49	21	6.5	5.5	8.5	3	2	28
Infratest dimap	2–6 Apr 2020	1,003	49	17	8	6	10	–	3	32
Civey	15 Mar – 5 Apr 2020	4,535	44.1	19.6	8.1	8.6	9.3	3.1	3.2	24.5
Wahlkreisprognose	16–20 Mar 2020	–	46	23.5	7.5	6	7.5	3	3	22.5
Wahlkreisprognose	5 Mar 2020	–	40.5	26	9	6.5	8	3	3.5	14
GMS	17–24 Feb 2020	1,006	38	20	11	11	9	3	4	18
Infratest dimap	8–13 Jan 2020	1,004	36	25	10	10	7	4	3	11
GMS	27 Dec – 2 Jan 2020	1,004	38	20	10	10	8	6	4	18
GMS	1–7 Oct 2019	1,005	37	22	11	10	8	5	3	15
INSA	16–23 Sep 2019	1,034	36	22	10	11	9	5	3	14
GMS	17–22 Jul 2019	1,003	37	22	11	9	7	5	3	15
GMS	18–24 Jun 2019	1,005	37	23	9	9	8	5	3	14
2019 EP election	26 May 2019	–	40.7	19.1	5.3	8.5	9.3	3.4	2.4	21.6
Civey	29 Mar – 26 Apr 2019	5,016	36.4	20.8	9.7	8.3	10.3	5.8	3.3	15.6
Civey	1–29 Mar 2019	4,515	38.1	20.3	10.1	8.3	9.5	5.4	3.2	17.8
Forsa	22–25 Jan 2019	1,003	38	23	12	8	6	5	3	15
Infratest dimap	3–7 Jan 2019	1,003	35	21	13	8	9	6	3	14
GMS	27 Dec – 2 Jan 2019	1,003	38	18	11	10	9	5	4	20
2018 state election	14 Oct 2018	–	37.2	17.6	11.6	10.2	9.7	5.1	3.2	19.6

=== Minister-President polling ===
Polling firm	Fieldwork date	Sample size						Lead
Polling firm	Fieldwork date	Sample size	Söder CSU	Hartmann Grüne	Aiwanger Free Voters	Böhm AfD	von Brunn SPD	Lead
Forschungsgruppe Wahlen	8 Oct 2023	–	57	14	–	–	–	43
Wahlkreisprognose	3–6 Oct 2023	985	44	13	13	10	5	31
Forschungsgruppe Wahlen	4–5 Oct 2023	1,209	54	20	–	–	–	34
Wahlkreisprognose	30 Sep – 3 Oct 2023	1,002	41	14	12	9	4	27
Forschungsgruppe Wahlen	25–28 Sep 2023	1,222	54	19	–	–	–	35
Wahlkreisprognose	14–20 Sep 2023	1,021	50	11	14	9	3	36
Forschungsgruppe Wahlen	4–7 Sep 2023	1,254	54	19	–	–	–	35
Wahlkreisprognose	4–7 Sep 2023	1,004	52	10	15	9	4	37
INSA	1–5 Sep 2023	1,000	45	7	13	–	–	32
Wahlkreisprognose	31 Aug – 4 Sep 2023	1,400	48	7	8	9	8	39
Wahlkreisprognose	14–19 Aug 2023	1,892	43	9	14	9	7	29
Wahlkreisprognose	14–19 Feb 2023	1,008	55	10	13	–	10	42
Wahlkreisprognose	13–17 Jan 2023	1,040	53	15	12	–	9	38

== Election result ==

Summary of the 8 October 2023 election results for the Landtag of Bavaria
Party	Constituency (Note: Erststimmen, local "Stimmkreis" votes)			Party list (Note: Zweitstimmen, regional "Wahlkreis" votes)		Total seats	+/-
Party	Votes	%	Seats	Votes	%	Total seats	+/-
Christian Social Union	2,527,810	37.0	85	2,531,761	37.1	85	0
Free Voters of Bavaria	1,078,037	15.8	2	1,085,812	15.9	37	+10
Alternative for Germany	1,008,195	14.7	0	992,240	14.5	32	+10
Alliance 90/The Greens	983,631	14.4	4	989,094	14.5	32	-6
Social Democratic Party of Germany	587,964	8.6	0	552,789	8.1	17	-5
Free Democratic Party	205,677	3.0	0	208,210	3.1	0	-11
Ecological Democratic Party	127,419	1.9	0	117,805	1.7	0	0
The Left	101,357	1.5	0	99,521	1.5	0	0
Bavaria Party	72,325	1.1	0	57,155	0.8	0	0
Grassroots Party	55,600	0.8	0	63,889	0.9	0	New
Animal Protection Party	25,811	0.4	0	43,981	0.6	0	0
Die PARTEI	32,378	0.5	0	31,776	0.5	0	0
Volt Germany	15,785	0.2	0	25,909	0.4	0	New
V-Partei^{3}	11,061	0.2	0	11,764	0.2	0	0
Party of Humanists	3,609	0.1	0	10,417	0.2	0	0
Total	6,836,659	100.00	91	6,822,123	100.00	203	-2
Invalid	58,425	0.8		72,715	1.1		
Turnout				6,895,807	73.1	+0.8	
Registered voters				9,430,600			

Winners of constituency seats CSU FWB GRÜNE

Popular vote
CSU	37.04%
FW	15.84%
AFD	14.65%
Grünen	14.44%
SPD	8.35%
FDP	3.03%
ÖDP	1.80%
LINKE	1.47%
BP	0.95%
Others	2.43%

Seats
CSU	41.87%
FW	18.23%
AFD	15.76%
Grünen	15.76%
SPD	8.37%

CSU vote

FW vote

AfD vote

Linke vote

SPD vote

Green vote

FDP vote

== Aftermath and state government formation ==
After the election, the state government was again formed as a coalition between CSU and FW. Markus Söder was re-elected Minister-President by the Landtag on 31 October, with 120 votes for, 76 votes against, and two abstentions. He formed the Third Söder cabinet.

AfD politician Daniel Halemba was elected to the Bavarian State Parliament in the 2023 Bavarian state election. On 27 October, three days before the constituent session, an arrest warrant was issued against him. Halemba was arrested on the morning of 30 October 2023 in Kirchheim unter Teck on suspicion of incitement to hatred and the use of signs of anti-constitutional organizations.
