= Martin Burkert =

German politician and member of the SPD (born 1964)

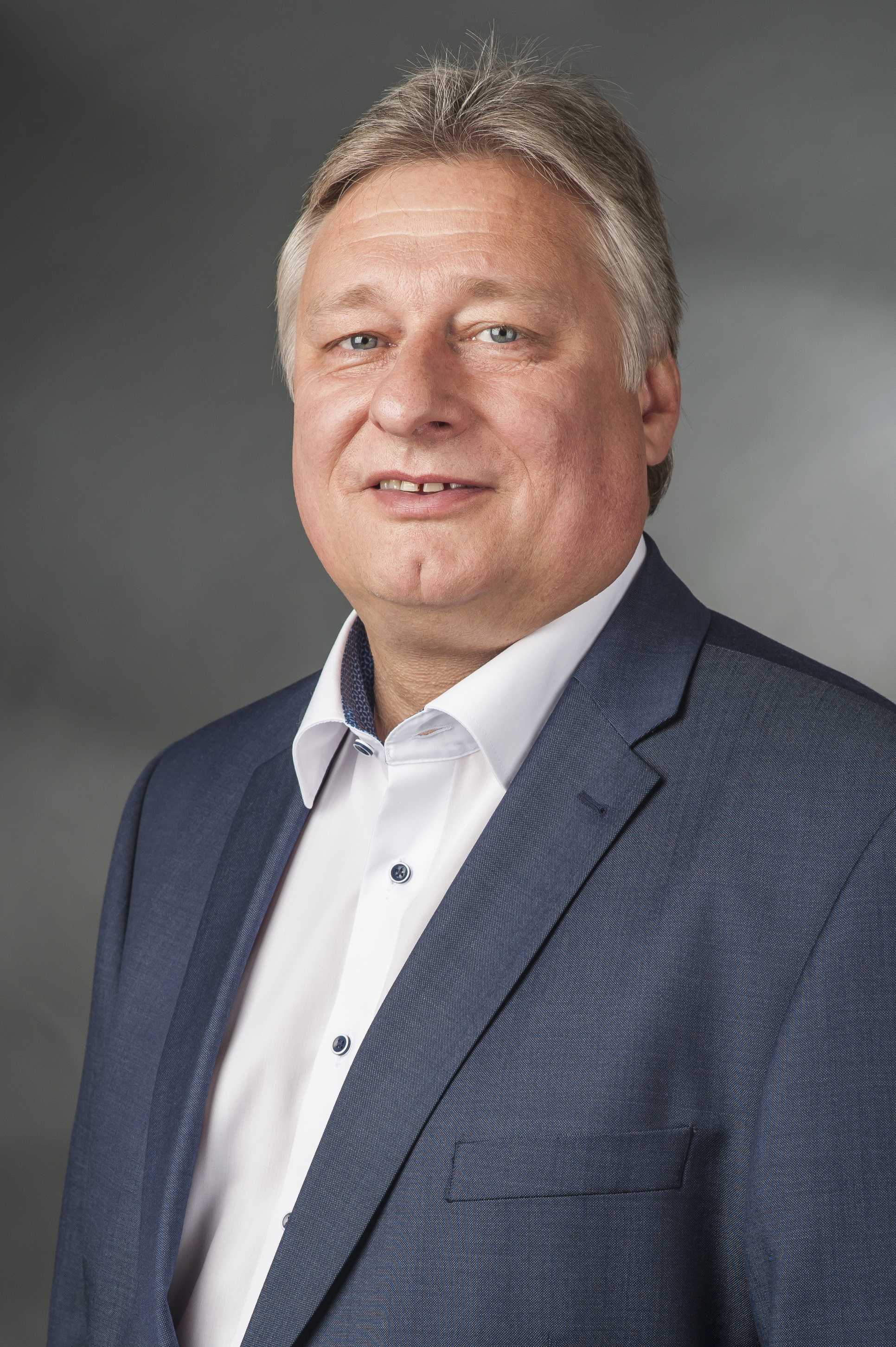

Deputy Leader of the Social Democratic Party in Bavaria
- Incumbent
- Assumed office 12 May 2013 Serving with Johanna Uekermann
- Leader: Natascha Kohnen
- Preceded by: Ulrike Mascher

Member of the Bundestag for Bavaria
- In office 18 September 2005 – 1 February 2020
- Succeeded by: Bela Bach
- Constituency: Social Democratic Party List

Personal details
- Born: 14 October 1964 (age 61) Würzburg, West Germany
- Party: SPD

Martin Burkert (born 14 October 1964) is a German trade unionist and former politician of the Social Democratic Party (SPD).

== Political career ==
Burkert was born in Würzburg. He was first elected member of the German Bundestag in the 2005 national elections. Throughout his time in parliament, he served on the Committee on Transport and, from 2013 on, the Committee on Transport and Digital Infrastructure; he chaired the committee from 2013 to 2017. In his first term from 2005 until 2009, he was also a member of the Committee on the Environment, Nature Conservation and Nuclear Safety.

In addition to his committee assignments, Burkert served as deputy chairman of the German-Mexican Parliamentary Friendship Group from 2014 until 2019. He was also a member of the German-Brazilian Parliamentary Friendship Group and of the German-Swiss Parliamentary Friendship Group.

Within the SPD parliamentary group, Burkert belonged to the Parliamentary Left, a left-wing movement. He was a member of the working group on municipal policy. From 2010 until 2019, he led the Bundestag group of SPD parliamentarians from Bavaria, one of the largest delegations within the parliamentary group.

From 2013, Burkert served as deputy chairman of the SPD in Bavaria, under the leadership of successive chairpersons Florian Pronold (2013-2017) and Natascha Kohnen (from 2017).

In the negotiations to form a coalition government under the leadership of Chancellor Angela Merkel following the 2017 federal elections, Burkert was part of the working group on transport and infrastructure, led by Michael Kretschmer, Alexander Dobrindt and Sören Bartol.

== Later career ==
By the end of 2019, Burkert resigned from parliament to join the board of railway and transport union EVG. He was replaced by Bela Bach, the next SPD candidate on the party-list.

== Other activities ==
=== Regulatory agencies ===
- Federal Network Agency for Electricity, Gas, Telecommunications, Posts and Railway (BNetzA), Member of the Rail Infrastructure Advisory Council (since 2010)

=== Corporate boards ===
- Adler Versicherungs AG, member of the supervisory board
- DB Cargo Deutschland, member of the supervisory board
- DEVK, deputy chairman of the supervisory board
- S-Bahn Berlin, member of the supervisory board
- TeamBank AG, member of the advisory board
- Schultheiss Wohnbau AG, member of the supervisory board (2009-2014)
- Sparda-Bank Nürnberg eG, member of the supervisory board (2005-2010)

=== Non-profit organizations ===
- Auto Club Europa (ACE), Member
- Railway and Transport Union (EVG), Member
