= Natascha Kohnen =

German politician (born 1967)

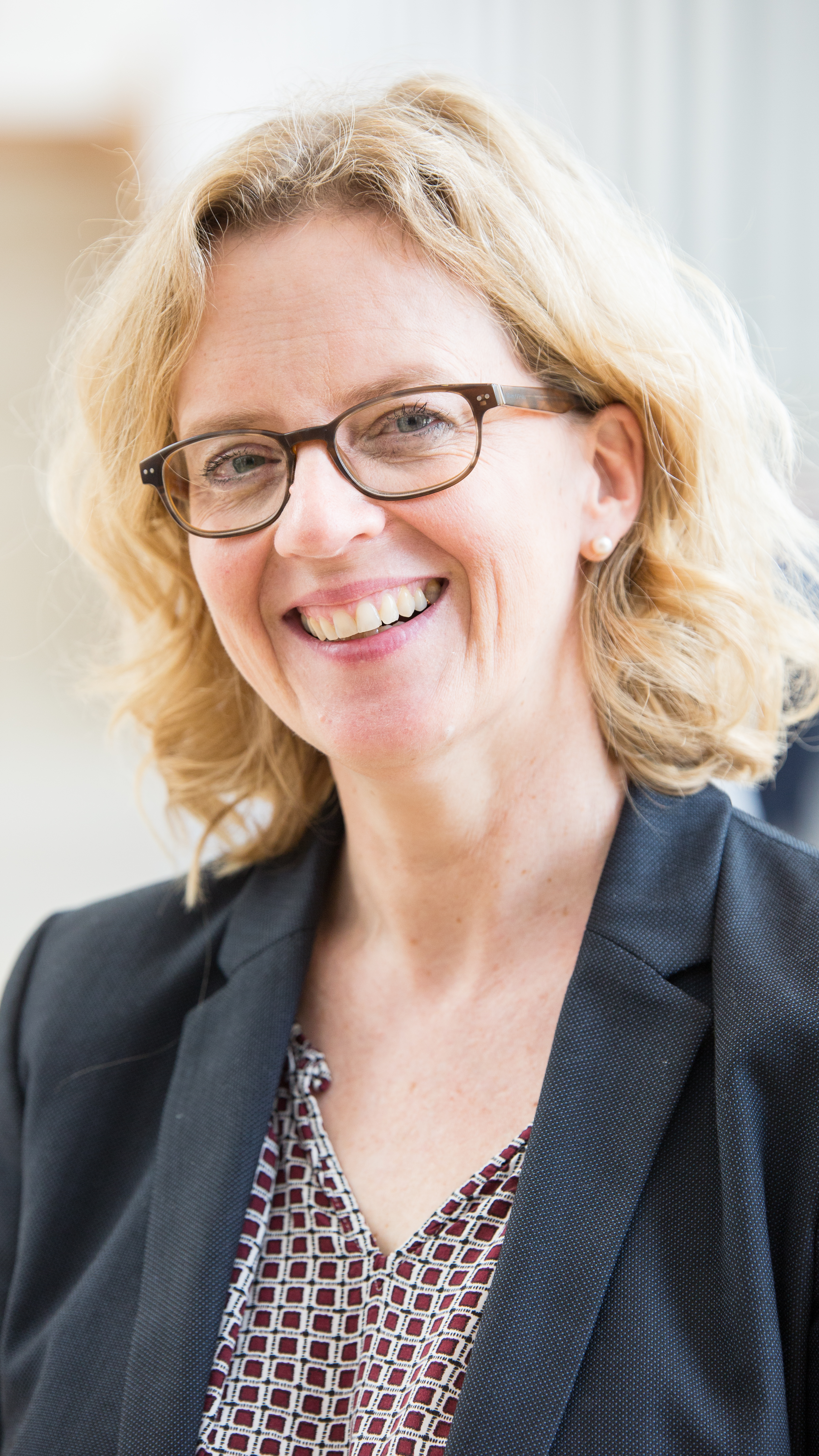
- Natascha Kohnen in 2018

Leader of the SPD Bavaria
- In office 20 May 2017 – 24 April 2021
- Deputy: Martin Burkert; Johanna Uekermann
- Preceded by: Florian Pronold
- Succeeded by: Ronja Endres; Florian von Brunn

Deputy Leader of the Social Democratic Party
- In office 7 December 2017 – 6 December 2019 Serving with Olaf Scholz, Malu Dreyer, Manuela Schwesig, Ralf Stegner and Thorsten Schäfer-Gümbel
- Leader: Martin Schulz; Andrea Nahles
- Preceded by: Hannelore Kraft
- Succeeded by: Number of deputies reduced

General Secretary of the Social Democratic Party in Bavaria
- In office 11 July 2009 – 20 May 2017
- Leader: Florian Pronold
- Preceded by: Susann Biedefeld
- Succeeded by: Uli Grötsch

Member of the Landtag of Bavaria for Upper Bavaria
- Incumbent
- Assumed office 20 October 2008
- Constituency: Social Democratic List

Personal details
- Born: 27 October 1967 (age 57); Munich, Bavaria, West Germany
- Political party: Social Democratic Party of Germany

Natascha Kohnen (born 27 October 1967) is a German politician of the SPD who has been a member of the Landtag of Bavaria since 2009. From 2017 until 2021, she served as chairwoman of the SPD Bavaria.

== Political career ==
Kohnen has been a member of the SPD since 2001; from 2003 to 2009 she was the chairwoman of the Neubiberg SPD, where she formed part of the municipal council, and until 2009 sub-district deputy chairwoman of the party of the Munich district. At the 2009 SPD state convention in Weiden she was selected the Secretary General in Bavaria. From 2013 to 2015 she was the chairwoman of the party in the district of Munich, and since December 2015 she is on the federal executive committee of the SPD.

In a member survey of the election of the regional chairman of the Social Democratic Party of Germany in Bavaria in the spring of 2017 Kohnen was suggested by her predecessor Florian Pronold, reaching 53.8% of the vote. At the party congress on 20 May 2017, she was elected with 88.3% of the delegate votes for state leaders of the SPD in Bavaria.

In the Bavarian state election in 2008, Kohnen was elected for the constituency of Upper Bavaria and since 20 October 2008 is a member of the Bavarian state parliament, where she has been a member of the Committee on Environment and Health (2008-2013) and the Committee on Economic Affairs (since 2013). From 2011 to 2013 she was also deputy leader of the SPD group in the Landtag.

In the negotiations to form a coalition government under the leadership of Chancellor Angela Merkel following the 2017 federal elections, Kohnen co-chaired the working group on urban development; her counterparts were Bernd Althusmann and Kurt Gribl.

== Other activities ==
- Bavarian Broadcasting (BR), Member of the Broadcasting Council (since 2018)
- Georg von Vollmar Academy, Member of the Board
- IG Metall, Member

== Personal life ==
Kohnen was born in Munich, and grew up in the Maxvorstadt district. In 1987 she graduated from high school, subsequently studying biology at the University of Regensburg from 1987 to 1992. From 1994 to 2002 she worked as a freelance lecturer in the field of natural sciences at the Oldenbourg Verlag in Munich; during that time, she also lived in Paris for two years. Since 2001 Kohnen runs her own editorial office with freelancers. She has two children.
