= Daniel Halemba =

German politician (born 2001)

Member of the Bavarian State Parliament for Lower Franconia
- Incumbent
- Assumed office 2023

Personal details
- Born: 2001 (age 24–25) Upper Silesia, Poland
- Party: Alternative for Germany

Daniel Halemba (born 2001) is a German politician and member of the Alternative for Germany (AfD) party.

== Early life and education ==
Daniel Halemba was born in Upper Silesia in Poland in 2001. When he was three years old, his parents moved to Baden-Württemberg before eventually settling in Lower Franconia. He is a university student studying business law.

== Investigation and arrest ==
On 14 September 2023, the police searched a house of the Teutonia Prague fraternity, of which Halemba was a member, and seized evidence. The search was part of an ongoing investigation into the organization for use of banned symbols and incitement to hatred after neighbors had reported hearing "Sieg Heil" shouted from the home. Halemba described the warrant as "totally lawless". Katrin Ebner-Steiner has claimed the house-search was politically motivated, with the aim of harming the AfD.

On 8 October 2023, Halemba was elected to the Bavarian State Parliament in the 2023 Bavarian state election. On 27 October, three days before the constituent session, an arrest-warrant was issued against him. Since the investigations had already taken place before the constituent session of the state parliament, Halemba was not allowed political immunity afterwards. Halemba's defense lawyer, the former AfD politician Dubravko Mandic, said he has applied for a detention review of the arrest warrant at the Würzburg District Court. Initially, the arrest warrant could not be executed because Halemba could not be found. The Bavarian Ministry of the Interior told BR24 on October 28, 2023 that the search for Halemba was underway at full speed. Halemba was arrested on the morning of October 30, 2023 in Kirchheim unter Teck on suspicion of incitement to hatred and the use of signs of anti-constitutional organizations. After his arrest, Halemba successfully retained his membership in AfD, as part of a settlement with party leadership.

The charge for the usage of banned symbols was dropped since they were not displayed publicly and thus not illegal under Strafgesetzbuch section 86a. The other charges are still being pursued however, with the first court date on 7 January 2026 and eight further dates following. Nonetheless, Halemba continues to reject the accusations and is confident of acquittal.
