= Franziska Drohsel =

German politician (born 1980)

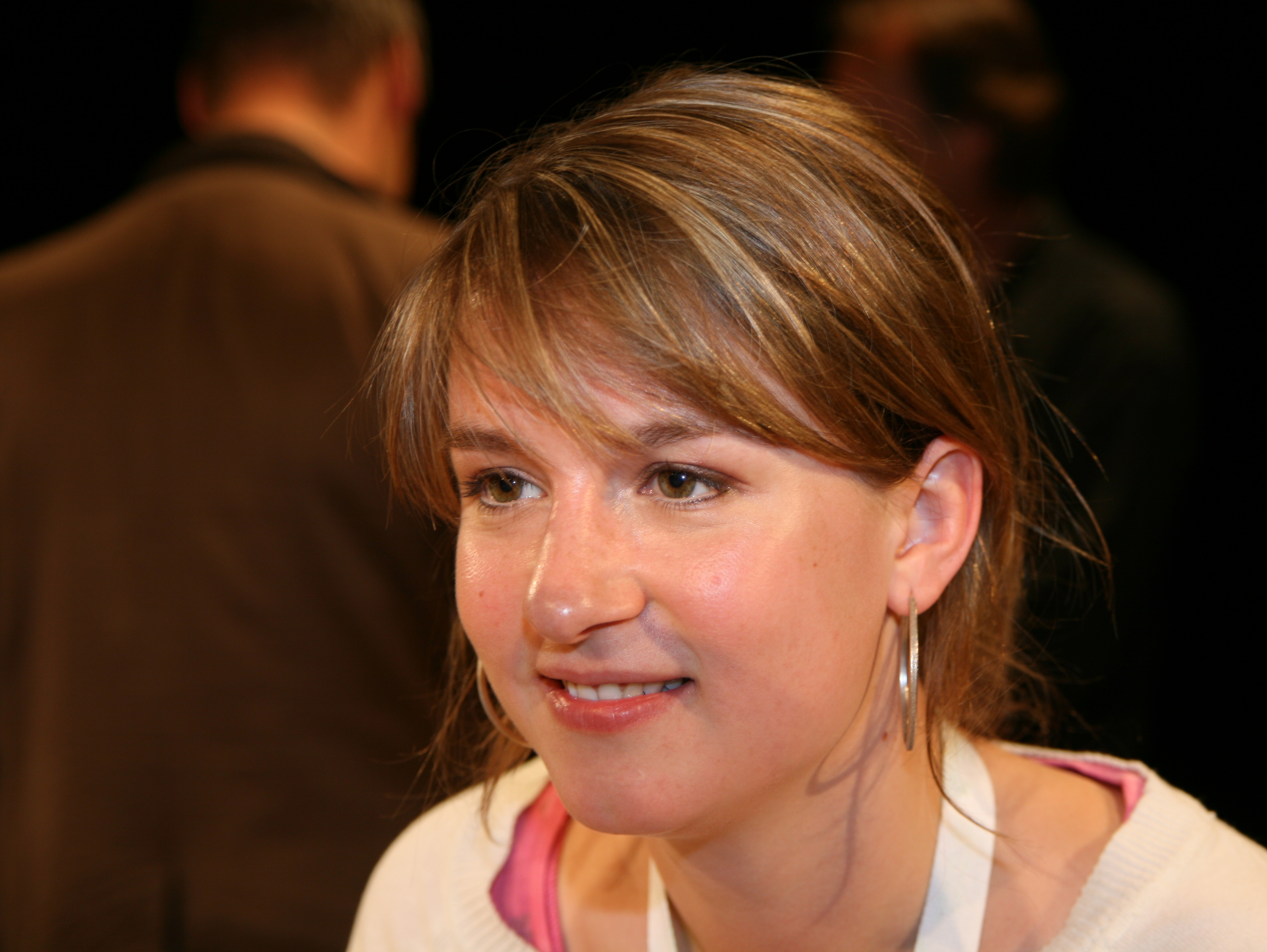

Chairwoman of the Young Socialists in the SPD
- In office 24 November 2007 – 18 June 2010
- Preceded by: Björn Böhning
- Succeeded by: Sascha Vogt

Personal details
- Born: 1 June 1980 (age 46) Wedding, West Berlin, Germany
- Party: SPD
- Education: Humboldt University of Berlin
- Occupation: Lawyer, politician

Franziska Drohsel (born 1 June 1980 in Wedding, West Berlin) is a German politician. From 24 November 2007 until 18 June 2010 she was chairperson of the Young Socialists in the SPD (also called "Jusos"), a division of the German Social Democratic Party.

Drohsel studied law, and including an Eramus exchange year at La Sapienza University, in Rome. After state legal exams in 2005, she became a doctoral student and researcher at Humboldt University of Berlin. She has been active with Jusos since 1995, and the SPD since 2001. She is also a member of the trade union ver.di. As a result of public pressure, a few days after being elected Jusos party chairperson, she gave up her membership to Rote Hilfe e.V. (a revival of the historical International Red Aid), which is considered to be a left-wing extremist organization by the German Verfassungsschutz.

Drohsel earned a doctorate under Ulrich Battis in 2010, with her dissertation "Vereinbarkeit gesetzlicher Öffnungsklauseln mit der Koalitionsfreiheit aus Art. 9 Abs. 3 GG." From April 2012 to March 2014, she was for the first time deputy chairwoman of the Steglitz-Zehlendorf SPD district association, and in March 2016 she took over this office again. Since February 23, 2016, she has additionally been deputy chairwoman of the Berlin-Lankwitz SPD within the Steglitz-Zehlendorf district association. From 2015 to 2017, she worked for the law firm Gaßner, Groth, Siederer & Coll. and advised on construction planning and building regulation law, grant law, and constitutional law. Since 2017, she has worked as a legal officer for the Federal Coordination of Specialized Counseling against Sexualized Violence in Childhood and Adolescence.
