= Björn Böhning =

German politician

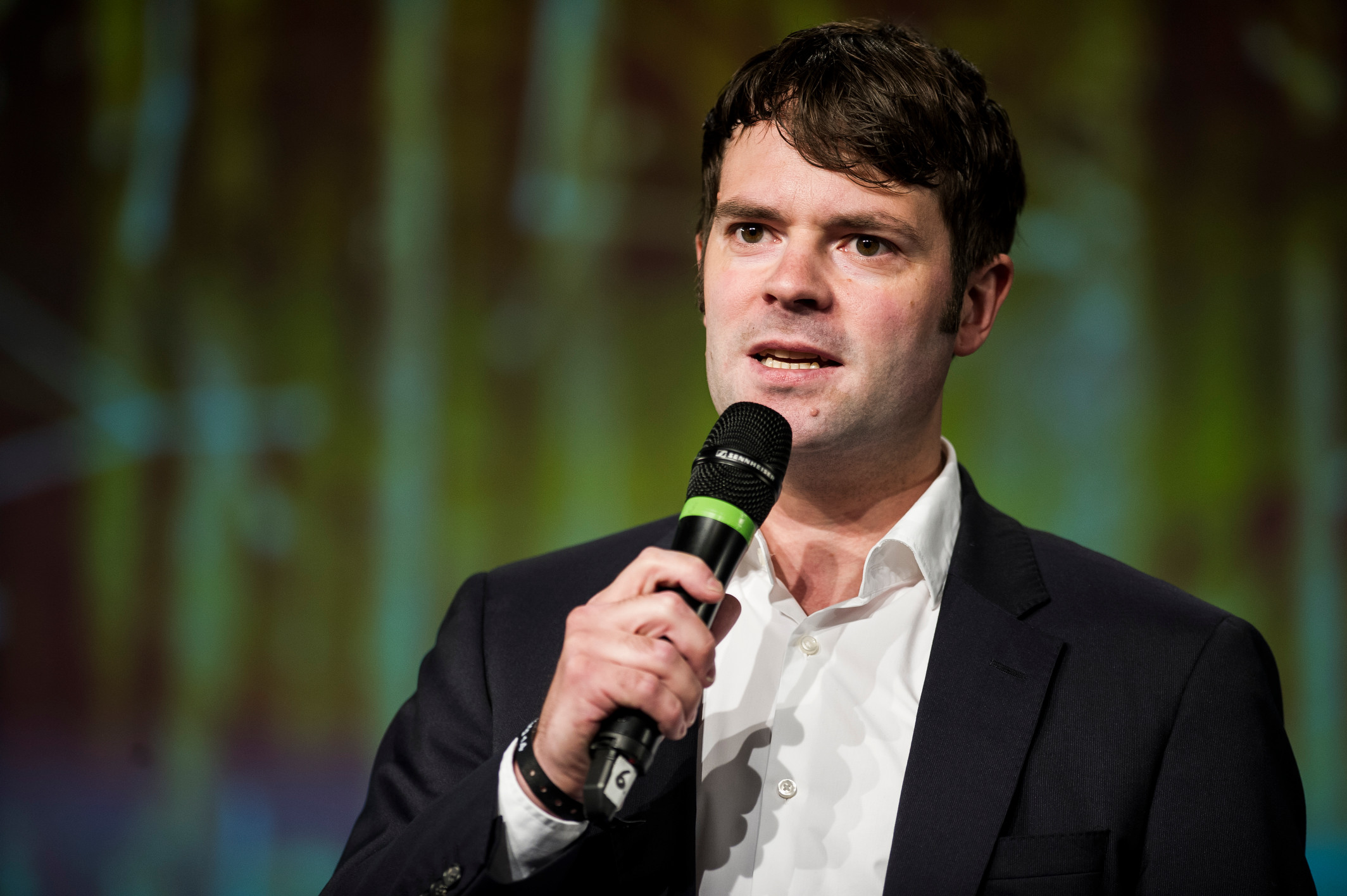
- Böhning in 2014

Chief of the Berlin Senate Chancellery
- In office 2 December 2011 – 20 March 2018
- Governing Mayor: Klaus Wowereit; Michael Müller
- Preceded by: Monika Helbig
- Succeeded by: Christian Gaebler

Leader of the Jusos
- In office 17 June 2004 – 24 November 2007
- Preceded by: Niels Annen
- Succeeded by: Franziska Drohsel

Personal details
- Born: 2 June 1978 (age 48) Geldern, West Germany
- Party: SPD
- Education: Freie Universität Berlin
- Occupation: Politician

Björn Böhning (born 2 June 1978) is a German politician of the Social Democratic Party (SPD) who has been serving as State Secretary at the Federal Ministry of Labour and Social Affairs under the leadership of minister Hubertus Heil from 2018 to 2022.

From 2004 to 2007 Böhning was the chairperson of the Young Socialists in the SPD ("Jusos"), the SPD's youth organization.

== Early life and educations ==
Böhning was born in Geldern and grew up in Lübeck. He studied political science at the Otto Suhr Institute (OSI) of the Free University of Berlin from 1999 until 2004.

== Political career ==
From 15 February 2008 Böhning served as spokesperson of the "Forum Demokratische Linke 21" of the SPD, a group of left-aligned politicians within the party; in 2014, he left the group. He unsuccessfully ran as candidate for the electoral district of Berlin-Friedrichshain-Kreuzberg – Prenzlauer Berg East in the 2009 national elections.

From December 2011 Böhning served as Head of the Senate Chancellery of the Federal State of Berlin, first under Governing Mayor Klaus Wowereit (2011–2014) and later under Michael Müller (2014–2018). In the negotiations to form a Grand Coalition of Chancellor Angela Merkel's Christian Democrats (CDU together with the Bavarian CSU) and the SPD following the 2013 German elections, he was part of the SPD delegation in the working group on digital policy, led by Dorothee Bär and Brigitte Zypries.

In the fourth coalition government of Chancellor Angela Merkel, Böhning has been serving as State Secretary at the Federal Ministry of Labour and Social Affairs under the leadership of minister Hubertus Heil since 2018.

== Other activities ==
- Business Forum of the Social Democratic Party of Germany, Member of the Political Advisory Board (since 2020)
- German Film and Television Academy (DFFB), Chairman of the Board of Trustees
- Deutsche Kinemathek, Member of the Board of Trustees
- Deutschlandradio, Member of the Supervisory Board
- German Federal Film Board (FFA), Member of the Supervisory Board
- Medienboard Berlin-Brandenburg, Member of the Supervisory Board
- Villa Aurora, Member of the Board of Trustees
- Checkpoint Charlie Foundation, Chairman of the Board of Trustees
- spw – Zeitschrift für sozialistische Politik und Wirtschaft, Member of the Editorial Board
- 2017 German Computer Games Award, Member of the Jury

== Personal life ==
Böhning has been married since 2008.

== See also ==
- List of Social Democratic Party of Germany politicians
