= Florian von Brunn =

German politician (born 1969)

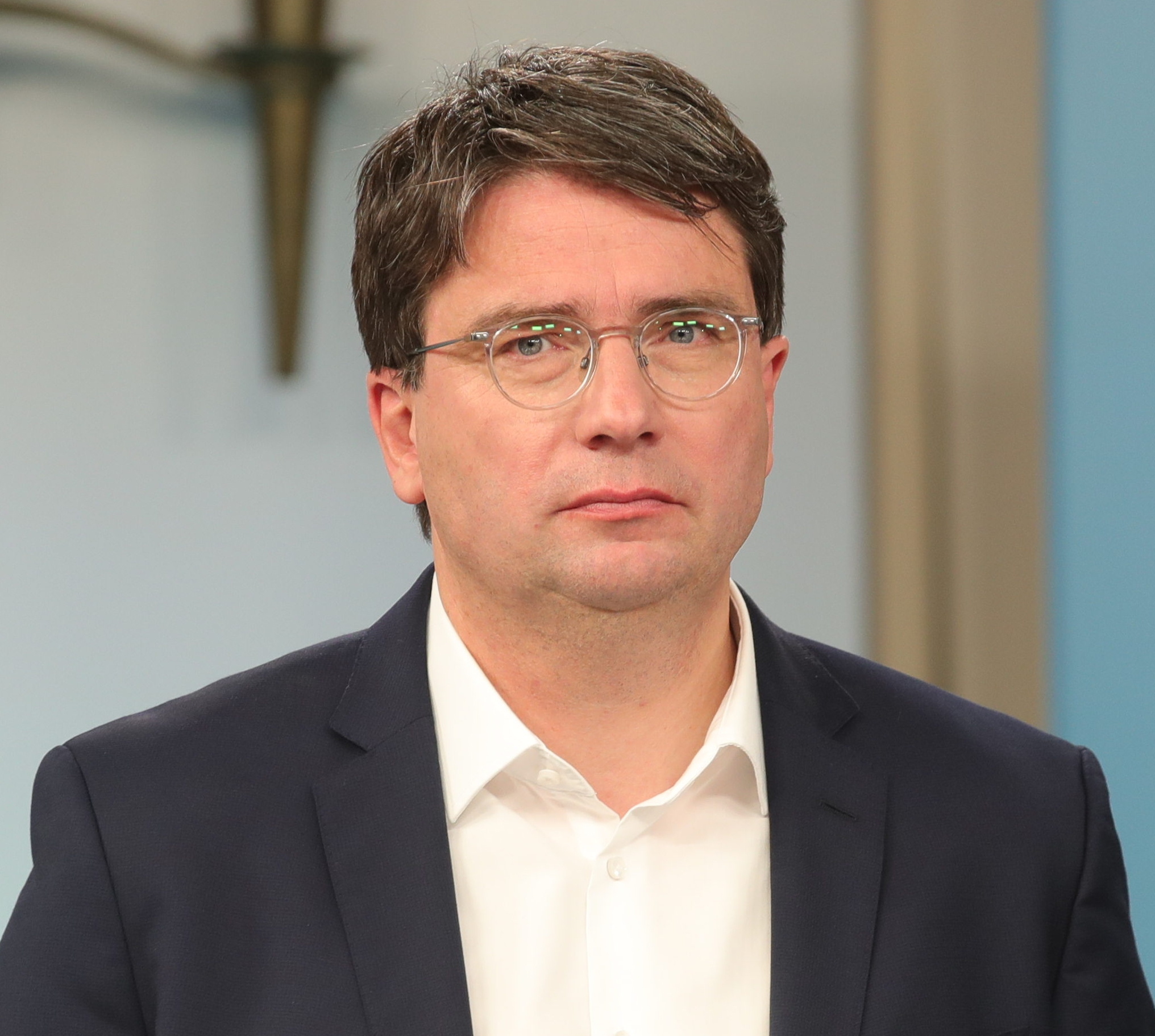
Florian von Brunn in 2023

Florian von Brunn (born 23 January 1969) is a German politician from the SPD of Bavaria and IT consultant. He has been a member of the Landtag of Bavaria since October 2013, and has been chairman of the SPD state parliamentary group since 2021 and chairman of the Bavarian SPD. He was his party's top candidate for the 2023 Bavarian state election.

== Early life, education and early career ==
Von Brunn was born in Munich.

After attending elementary school at the Pullach Catholic Family Works until 1979, Florian von Brunn graduated from high school in Icking in 1989 . After that he did his community service. From 1990 he studied philosophy and later modern and contemporary history, with minors in economic and social history and economics, at the universities in Munich and as a visiting student at St. Hugh's College of the University of Oxford. The latter with a scholarship from the German Academic Exchange Service. From 1994 to 1998 he was a fellow of the Friedrich Ebert Foundation. He graduated with an MA degree.

From 1997 to 2002 he worked as a freelancer for the Science and Politics Foundation in Ebenhausen. From 1998 to 1999 he worked as a freelancer for the Federal Agency for Civic Education as part of the exhibition "50 Years of the Basic Law". From 1998 to 2006 he also worked as a research assistant for Klaus Barthel when he was a member of the Bundestag. From 2000 to 2013, Florian von Brunn worked as a freelance IT consultant and honorary lecturer for the Bayerische Seminar.

From 2005 to 2008, Florian von Brunn served as honorary director of a parents' initiative (creche and kindergarten) in Munich-Sendling.

== Political career ==
Florian von Brunn has been a member of the SPD since 1990. He won a mandate in the 2013 Bavarian state election and has been a member of the Bavarian state parliament for the SPD ever since. In 2018 Bavarian state election, he was able to win another mandate. On April 24, 2021, he was elected chairman of the Bavarian SPD together with Ronja Endres. Shortly thereafter, on 19 May 2021, he was also elected parliamentary group leader of the Bavarian SPD parliamentary group. He is also deputy chairman of the Munich SPD.

His political areas of expertise are environmental and transport policy as well as consumer protection in close connection with social and labour market policy.

In the Landtag of Bavaria he is a member of the committee for environment and consumer protection and spokesman for the SPD state parliamentary group for environment and consumer protection.

As part of the committee of inquiry into the “Bavarian Egg” food scandal, he endeavoured to have the abuses fully clarified and published. He also campaigned for more rights and better protection for consumers and the environment in connection with the contamination of drinking water in Bavaria by per-fluorinated and polyfluorinated chemicals. He is also fighting for a third national park in Bavaria and against the third runway at Munich Airport.

In addition, protecting the Alps for future generations is a particularly important issue for him. He was involved in a campaign against the expansion of the ski area on the Riedberger Horn in the Allgäu and thus made a significant contribution to preventing it. Again and again he positioned himself for a traffic turnaround in the Alps to protect residents and nature. To this end, he took part in several local demonstrations and organized information events.

In the member survey for the election of the state chairman of the Bavarian SPD in spring 2017, which was decided in favor of Natascha Kohnen, he was the candidate with the second highest number of votes.

He has been an assessor on the SPD party executive since December 2021. On 22 October 2022, he was elected the top candidate of the Bavarian SPD for the 2023 Bavarian state election with 93 percent of the votes at a state party conference in Munich. In the election, he was elected on the state list, but the SPD performed poorly.

== Political positions ==
Florian von Brunn demands that wealth be better distributed and that more money be used for pensions, care and education. He is involved in the fight against right-wing extremism and racism.

=== Economic policy ===
Florian von Brunn initiated and significantly shaped a social-ecological innovation and economic stimulus program for Bavaria, which was adopted as an official position by the SPD parliamentary group.
