= Sascha Vogt =

German politician (born 1980)

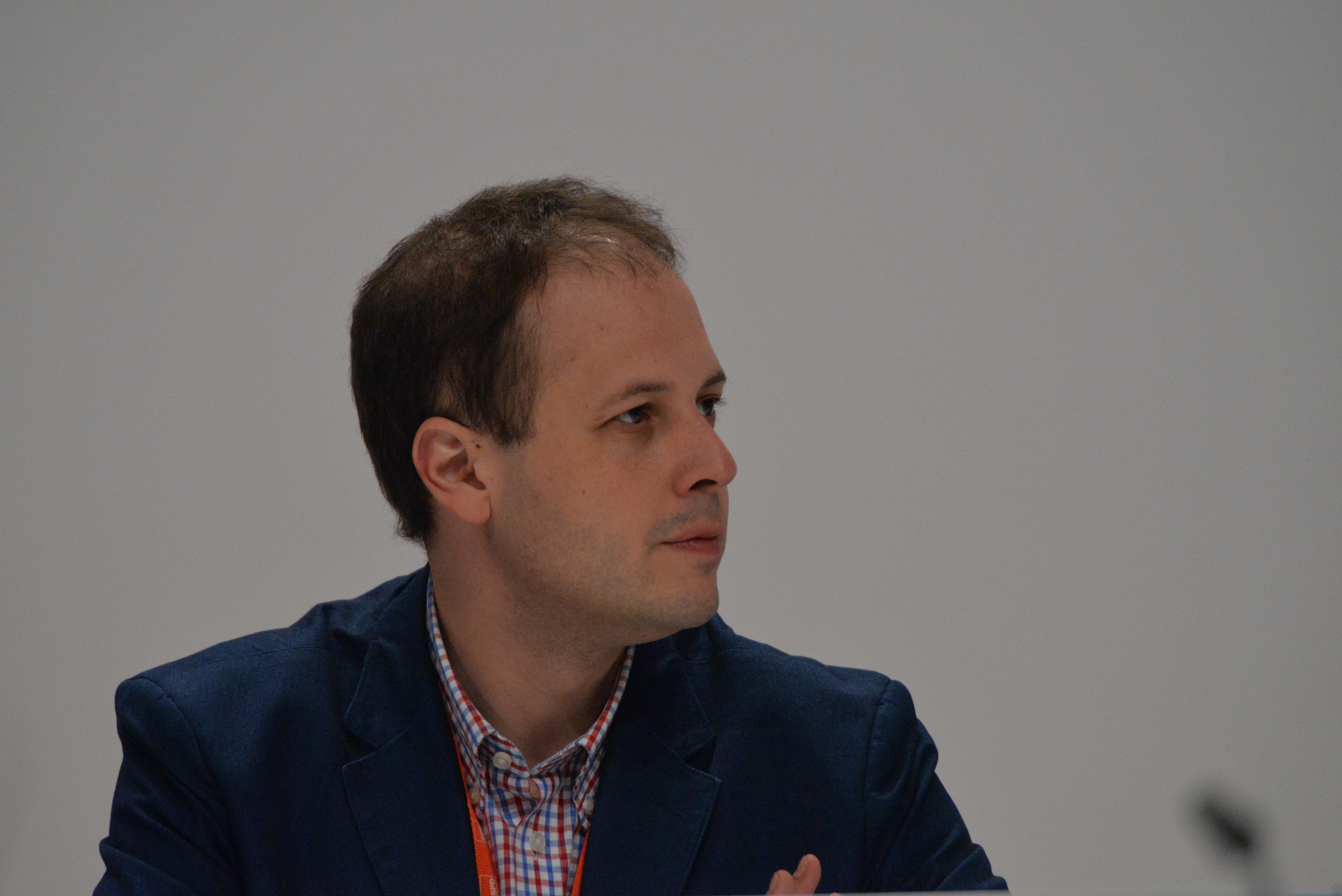
- Vogt in 2015

Chairman of the Young Socialists in the SPD
- In office June 2010 – December 2013
- Preceded by: Franziska Drohsel
- Succeeded by: Johanna Uekermann

Personal details
- Born: 13 July 1980 (age 46) Iserlohn, Germany
- Party: SPD
- Education: Westfälische Wilhelms-Universität
- Occupation: Politician

Sascha Vogt (born 13. July 1980) is a German politician. From June 2010 until December 2013 he was chairperson of the Young Socialists in the SPD (also called "Jusos"), a division of the German Social Democratic Party.

== Political career ==
In 1997, Vogt co-founded Juso AG in Hemer. From May 2002 to April 2004, he worked as a member of the Juso University Group in the General Students' Committee at the University of Münster. He initially served as a public relations officer, and in 2003 became Chairman.

Since 2008, Vogt has formed part of the Juso-Landesvorstand board, and since 2009 part of the Juso-Federal Board. Additionally, he was a member of the Federal Executive of the Juso-Hochschulgruppen. On 25 November 2011 Vogt was re-elected at the Federal Congress of Jusos with 72.9% of votes.

Since 2013, Vogt forms part of the SPD party executive committee. He was last re-elected at the federal party congress on 8 December 2017. He was not re-elected in 2019.
