= Bela Bach =

German politician (born 1990)

Member of the Bundestag from Bavaria
- In office 4 February 2020 – 26 October 2021
- Preceded by: Martin Burkert
- Constituency: Social Democratic Party List

Personal details
- Born: 30 September 1990 (age 35) Magdeburg, East Germany
- Party: SPD
- Education: LMU Munich

Bela Bach (born 30 September 1990) is a German politician of the Social Democratic Party (SPD) who served as a member of the Bundestag from the state of Bavaria from 2020 until 2021.

== Early life and education ==
Born in Magdeburg, Saxony-Anhalt, Bach completed her Abitur in 2010 and subsequently studied law at LMU Munich until 2018.

== Political career ==
Bach has been a member of the SPD since 2007. On 4 February 2020 she succeeded Martin Burkert in the Bundestag. In parliament, she was a member of the Committee on Transport and Digital Infrastructure and the Committee on Petitions.

In addition to her committee assignments, Bach was a substitute member of the German delegation to the Parliamentary Assembly of the Council of Europe (PACE) from 2020 until 2021, where she served on the Committee on Legal Affairs and Human Rights.

In March 2021, Bach announced that she would not stand in the 2021 federal elections.

== Other activities ==
- Federal Network Agency for Electricity, Gas, Telecommunications, Posts and Railway (BNetzA), Member of the Rail Infrastructure Advisory Council (since 2020)
- German United Services Trade Union (ver.di), Member
