= Black–orange coalition =

Coalition in German politics

The Black-orange coalition (German: Schwarz-orange Koalition) in German politics refers to a coalition between the centre-right CDU/CSU and the Free Voters (FW). The coalition has only been active in Bavaria since 2018, in both the Second Söder cabinet and Third Söder cabinet. The coalition has also been described as the Bavaria Coalition, Spezi Coalition and Papaya Coalition. In Austria, the black-orange coalition could refer to a coalition of the Austrian People's Party and the Alliance for the Future of Austria.

== See also ==
- German governing coalition
