= Eva Lettenbauer =

German politician (born 1992)

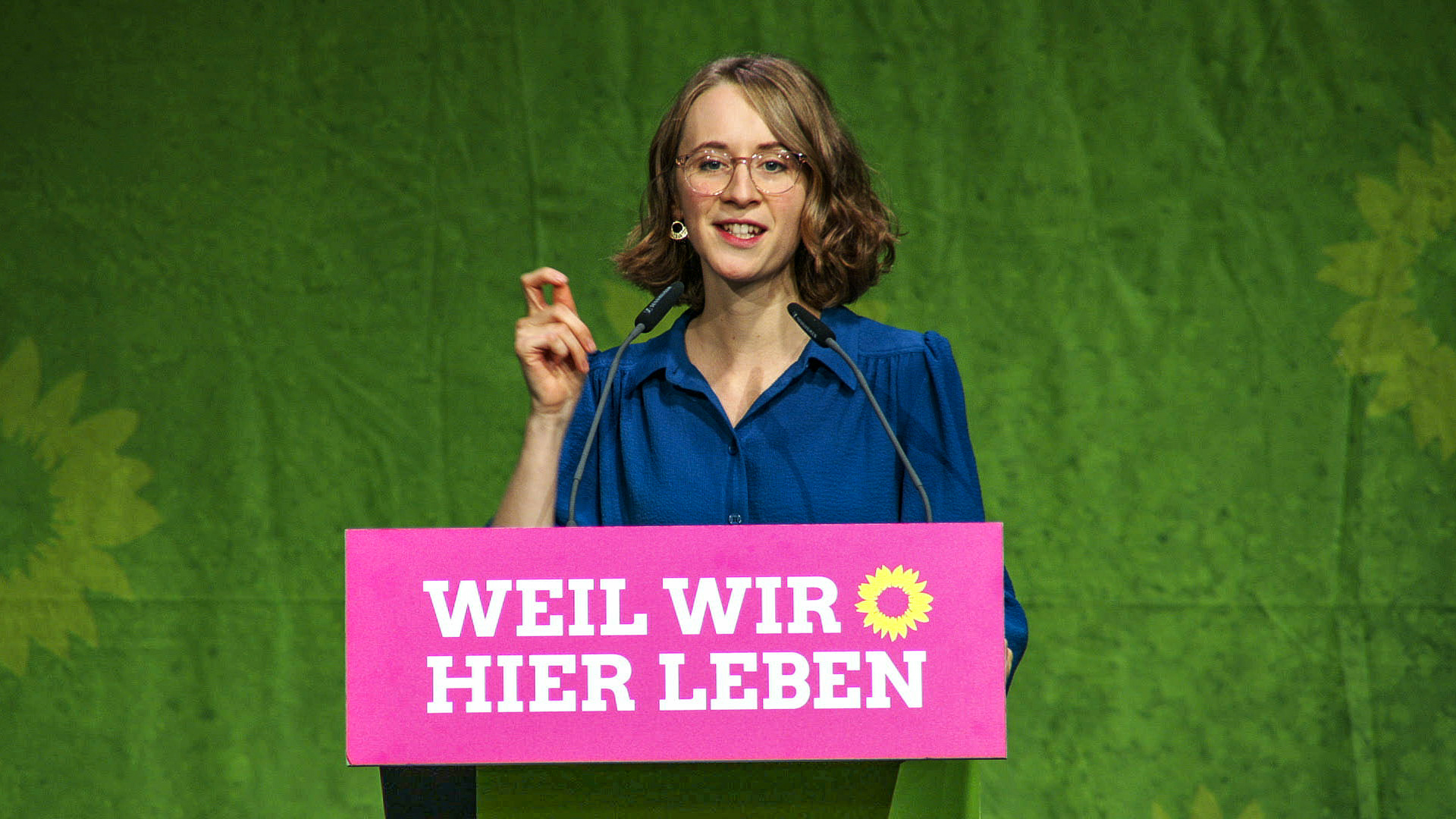
Eva Lettenbauer at the state party conference in Lindau 2019

Eva Lettenbauer (born 30 October 1992) is a German politician and industrial engineer who has been a member of the Landtag of Bavaria since 2018 and chairwoman of the Bavarian Greens since October 2019 (alongside Thomas von Sarnowski since 2021).

== Political career ==
Following the 2011 Fukushima nuclear disaster, Lettenbauer joined the Alliance 90/The Greens. In 2012 she took part in Youth and Parliament. From 2013 to 2017 she was youth spokeswoman and member of the district board of the Greens in Donau-Ries district. In May 2017 she was elected district chairperson. From October 2015 to October 2019 she was also a member of the state committee of the Greens of Bavaria.

She was initially active with the Green Youth in Swabia and became spokeswoman for the Green Youth in Bavaria in April 2015. She held the post for three years. At federal level, from November 2013 to October 2015, she was the coordinator of the expert forum for economics and social affairs/finance of the Green Youth.

Lettenbauer ran in the 2018 Bavarian state election together with Florian Siekman as the top duo of the Green Youth and ran for the Donau-Ries constituency and for the third position on the second vote ballot in the Schwaben constituency. She spoke early on in favour of an election campaign that puts green goals such as environmental protection in the foreground and against the focus on a coalition with Markus Söder. She was elected a member of the Bavarian state parliament in this election because she achieved the sixth-best overall vote result on the Greens constituency list. There Lettenbauer is a member of the Committee for Labour and Social Affairs, Youth and Family. From November 2018 to November 2019, Lettenbauer was Deputy Parliamentary Secretary and member of the parliamentary group executive committee. She was a member of the Council of Elders until 2019. To this day, she is deputy chairwoman of the prison advisory board at Kaisheim prison and at Niederschönenfeld prison.

In October 2019 she was elected chairwoman of Alliance 90/The Greens in Bavaria. She officiated alongside Eike Hallitzky until April 2021. Since April 2021, she has formed the leadership duo of the Bavarian Greens with Thomas von Sarnowski.

== Memberships ==
Ballclub Blossenau, BUND Naturschutz Kreisgruppe Donau-Ries, Wasserwacht Monheim, Freifunk Donau-Ries e. V., DAV Donau-Ries and netzbegrünung e. V.
