= Florian Pronold =

German politician (SPD) (born 1972)

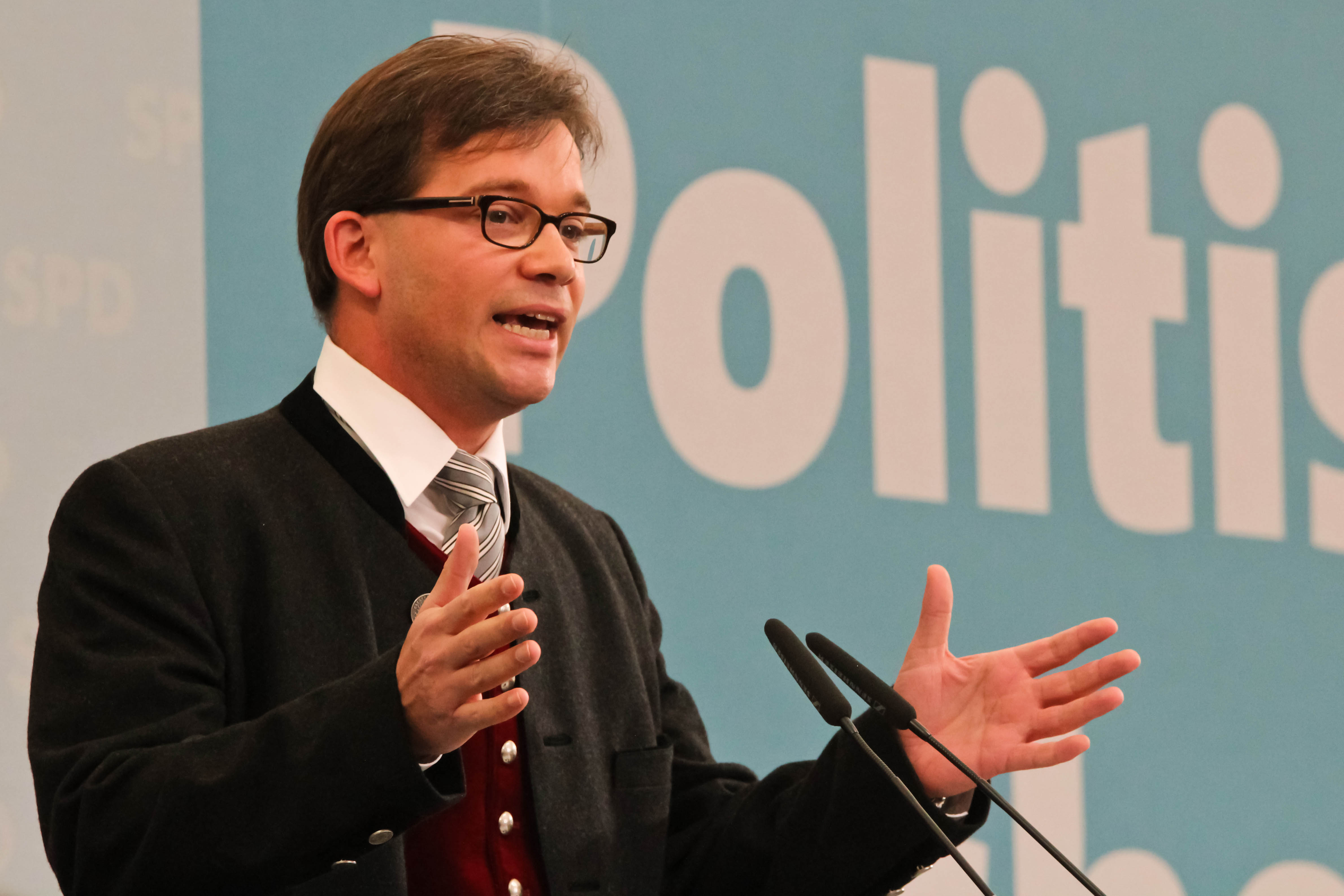

Member of the Bundestag
- In office 2002–2021

Personal details
- Born: 28 December 1972 (age 53) Passau, Bavaria, West Germany (now Germany)
- Citizenship: German
- Party: SPD
- Profession: Lawyer

Florian Pronold (born 28 December 1972) is a German lawyer and politician of the SPD who served as a member of the German Bundestag from 2002 until 2021. From 11 July 2009 to 20 May 2017, he was state chairman of the SPD Bavaria.

From 2013 until 2021, Pronold served as Parliamentary State Secretary in the Federal Ministry for the Environment, Nature Conservation and Nuclear Safety in the government of Chancellor Angela Merkel.

== Education and early career ==
Pronold was born in Passau. After graduating from high school in 1992 at the Robert Koch High School in Deggendorf, Pronold initially completed training - alongside comedian Django Asül - to become a banker at Sparkasse Deggendorf.

In 1995, Pronold began to study law at the University of Regensburg, finishing in 2000 with the first state law exam. After completing his legal clerkship, he also passed the second state examination in 2002 and has since been admitted as a lawyer. His activity and partnership in a law firm is currently suspended due to his work as Parliamentary State Secretary.

== Political career ==
=== Career in state politics ===
Pronold joined the SPD as a student in 1989. In 1993, he was elected the then youngest member of the regional executive committee of the SPD in Bavaria.

From 1996 to March 2010, Pronold was a member of the City Council of Deggendorf and from 1996 to 2002, as well as since 2005 to the district council of the district Deggendorf.

From 1999 to 2004, Pronold served as chairman of the Jusos in Bavaria and, in this capacity, was a member of the presidium of the Bavarian SPD. In 2003, he initiated the first membership referendum in the history of the SPD when he rallied against Chancellor Gerhard Schröder's Agenda 2010, together with other party members, in order to work towards a change of the party's political direction; he did not succeed.

Since 2004, Pronold has been chairman of the SPD subdistrict Rottal-Inn. From 2004 to 2009 he was Deputy Chairman of the SPD National Association of Bavaria. Since 2007, Pronold has been a member of the party executive committee of the SPD, since 2009 also of the presidium.

In the six-person shadow cabinet of the SPD Bayern for the 2008 state elections, Pronold represented the area "economy and finances". The SPD reached 18.6% in 2008, the worst result in the Bavarian state elections of the post-war period.

On 11 July 2009, the party convention of the Bavarian State Association of the SPD elected him with 89.7% of the delegate votes as successor of Ludwig Stiegler to the state chairman. In 2011 and 2013 Pronold was confirmed to this office. In May 2013, SPD candidate for chancellor Peer Steinbrück brought Florian Pronold into his competence team for the 2013 federal election. Pronold was to be responsible for transport and infrastructure. In 2013, the SPD won the second-worst election result of its party history on one hand, but improved in comparison to 2009.

Together with Doris Ahnen, Niels Annen, Martin Dulig and Gabriele Lösekrug-Möller, Pronold co-chaired the SPD’s national convention in Berlin in 2014.

In June 2015, in the election to the Bavarian state chairman of the SPD, there was a counter-candidature by the 71-year-old pensioner Walter Adam from Lower Bavaria, who criticized Pronold violently and was supported in his candidacy by the director Konstantin Ferstl. Pronold received only 63.3% of the vote, the opponent Adam surprisingly 31.7%. Christian Ude stated, Pronold has been "disassembled in a staggering manner." Weekly magazine Focus had already called Pronold's election result in 2013 of 80.6% a "damper".

In February 2017, Pronold announced that he would not stand for re-election at the state party convention in May. At the same time, he proposed the general secretary of the SPD national association, Natascha Kohnen, as party leader and top candidate for the state elections in 2018. is a successor of Pronold as the Bavaria's leader of the SPD, Kohnen was elected on 20 May 2017.

=== Member of Parliament, 2002–2021 ===
From the 2002 elections, Pronold was a member of the German Bundestag, representing the constituency of Rottal-Inn. From October 2004, he served as deputy speaker of the working group finances of the SPD parliamentary group. From December 2005 to February 2010, he was chairman of the Bavarian State Group in the SPD parliamentary group and also belongs to the group executive committee. From 2009 until 2013, Pronold served as deputy chairman of the SPD parliamentary group, under the leadership of the group's chairman Frank-Walter Steinmeier.

Ahead of the 2013 elections, Peer Steinbrück included Pronold in his shadow cabinet for the Social Democrats’ campaign to unseat incumbent Angela Merkel as chancellor. In the negotiations to form a Grand Coalition of Merkel's Christian Democrats (CDU together with the Bavarian CSU) and the SPD following the elections, Pronold led the SPD delegation in the working group on transport, building and infrastructure; his co-chair from the CSU was Peter Ramsauer.

In the third coalition government of Chancellor Merkel from 2013 until 2018, Pronold served as Parliamentary State Secretary to the Minister for the Environment, Nature Conservation, Building and Nuclear Safety Barbara Hendricks. In this capacity, he was initially responsible for construction and urban development. He remained in his position in the restructured and renamed Ministry in the fourth cabinet, this time under Minister Svenja Schulze.

Pronold was always elected to the Bundestag via the state list of Bavaria. In 2009, he ran for first place in the national list. In October 2020, he announced that he would not stand in the 2021 federal elections but instead resign from active politics by the end of the parliamentary term.

== Life after politics ==
Since 2023, Pronold has been the managing director of the Institut Bauen und Umwelt e. V. (IBU), an association of building material manufacturers.

== Other activities ==
- Bavarian Broadcasting (BR), Member of the Broadcasting Council (since 2010)
- Friedrich Ebert Foundation (FES), Member
- Georg von Vollmar Academy, Member of the Board
- VDI Centre for Resource Efficiency (VDI ZRE), Association of German Engineers, Member of the Advisory Board (since 2014)
- spw – Zeitschrift für sozialistische Politik und Wirtschaft, Member of the Editorial Board
- Amnesty International, Member
- Bund für Geistesfreiheit (Covenant for Freedom of Thought), Member
- German Federation for the Environment and Nature Conservation (BUND), Member
- Gegen Vergessen – Für Demokratie, Member
- Berlin Palace–Humboldtforum Foundation, Member of the Board of Trustees (2011-2013)

== Controversies ==
As Juso state chairman, Pronold called the crucifix in the 1990s in a satirical article in a youth magazine "Lattengustl" (literally "Slat Gustl") and was criticized for this. The then Bavarian SPD chairman Renate Schmidt condemned this statement as "unacceptable, pubertal vulgarity."

In March 2007, Pronold was disinvited by Fritz Schösser, the DGB chairman in Bavaria, as a speaker from the May 1 rally, because he "betrayed" trade union positions by his approval in the Bundestag of the health care reform and the "pension at 67".

In November 2012, Pronold was exposed to criticism from within the party. The SPD district administrator Michael Adam attacked Pronold on his Facebook page personally and in terms of content. In the further course, in which the personal, but not the substantive critique was taken back by Adam, also other officials criticized Pronold. The former deputy SPD state chairman and member of parliament Adelheid Rupp accused the party leadership, saying that professionally competent SPD politicians would not get a chance to speak.

== Personal life ==
Pronold is non-denominational and married.
