= Thomas von Sarnowski =

German politician from Bavaria (born 1988)

Thomas von Sarnowski (born 1988 in Ebersberg) is a German politician who has been one of the two state chairmen of the Alliance 90/The Greens in Bavaria since 2021 alongside Eva Lettenbauer.

== Studies and career ==
Von Sarnowski holds a bachelor's degree in political science with Economics and master's degrees in International Political Economy from the University of Warwick and Political & Administrative Sciences from the University of Konstanz. From 2016 to 2017 he was office manager of the state parliament vice president Ulrike Gote. From 2017 to 2021 he was a research assistant to Dieter Janecek, MdB. From 2016 to 2021 he was also managing director of the Upper Bavaria district association of Bündnis 90/Die Grünen.

== Political career ==
Sarnowski joined Alliance 90/The Greens in 2003. From 2004 to 2005 he was spokesman for the Green Youth in Ebersberg and from 2008 to 2012 he was chairman of the district association in Ebersberg. In 2018 he was re-elected as an assessor to the board. In the 2018 Bavarian state election, he ran for the Bavarian state parliament and was in 20th place on the Upper Bavarian list and stood for the Ebersberg voting district. He received 21.1% of the first votes and ranked 19th in the Upper Bavaria list in terms of total votes. After the Greens in Upper Bavaria only got 17 mandates, he did not get a mandate. He has been a member of the state committee of the Bavarian Greens since 2019.

In the 2020 Bavarian local elections, he successfully ran for the district council in Ebersberg and has been a district councillor since May 1, 2020.

In 2021 he ran for the state presidency of the Bavarian Greens and was elected in the first ballot with a clear majority against his competitor. In seiner Bewerbungsrede stellte er vor allem die Themen Radverkehr, ÖPNV und den ländlichen Raum in den Mittelpunkt. In his application speech, he focused primarily on the topics of cycling, public transport and rural areas. He has led the national association together with the co-chairwoman Eva Lettenbauer.
