= Ronja Endres =

German politician (born 1986)

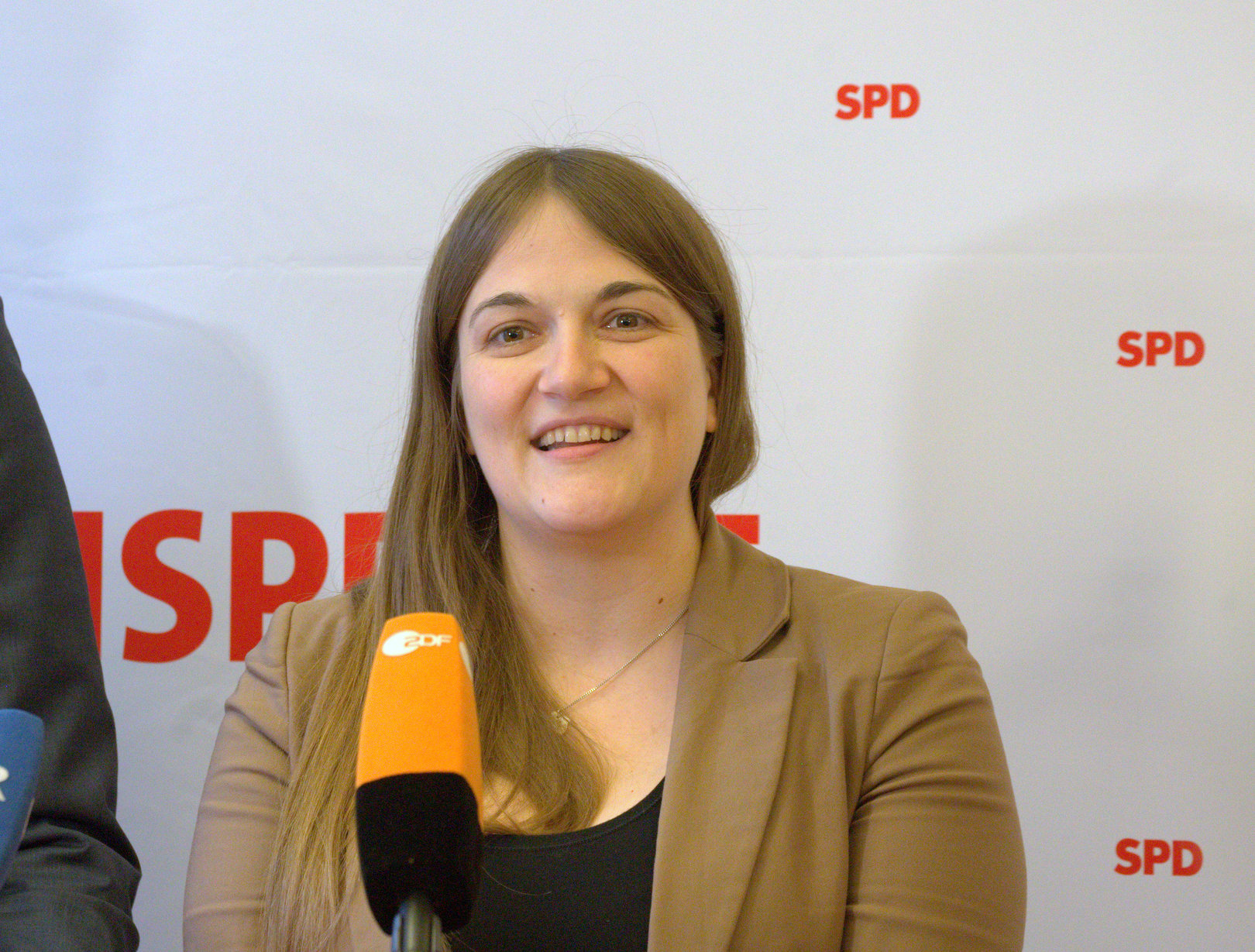
Endres in 2023

Ronja Endres (born 1986) is a German politician of the SPD of Bavaria. She has been chairwoman of the Bavarian SPD since 24 April 2021 in a dual leadership with Florian von Brunn.

== Early life ==
Endres was born in Starnberg and grew up in Penzberg. She completed an apprenticeship as a chemical laboratory assistant and, with the support of the Hans-Böckler-Foundation, obtained her Abitur on the second educational path. After studying international relations and management at the OTH Regensburg, the Catholic University of Eichstätt-Ingolstadt and spending time abroad in the US, Belgium, Pakistan and Estonia, she worked as a political consultant in Berlin and Munich.

She lives in Regensburg.

== Political career ==
Endres has been a member of the SPD since 2008. Since 2017 she has been a member of the AfA (working group for work in the SPD) state board of Bavaria and since 2018 a member of the federal board; since 2019 she has been chairwoman of AfA Bayern. Since 2019 she has also been an advisory voice on the state executive board of the Bavarian SPD and a member of the AsF (working group of social democratic women) Regensburg.

On 24 April 2021, the dual leadership of Endres and Florian von Brunn were elected at the state party conference of the Bavarian SPD.

In December 2021 she was elected to the SPD party executive.

Endres was a member of the 17th Federal Assembly.

For the 2023 Bavarian state election, Endres had applied within the party for the state parliament mandate for the Regensburg-Land and Regensburg-Stadt constituencies. In both cases, Endres withdrew her candidacy due to increased internal competition.

In the negotiations to form a Grand Coalition under the leadership of Friedrich Merz's Christian Democrats (CDU together with the Bavarian CSU) and the SPD following the 2025 German elections, Endres was part of the SPD delegation in the working group on digital policy, led by Manuel Hagel, Reinhard Brandt and Armand Zorn.
