= Johanna Uekermann =

German politician (born 1987)

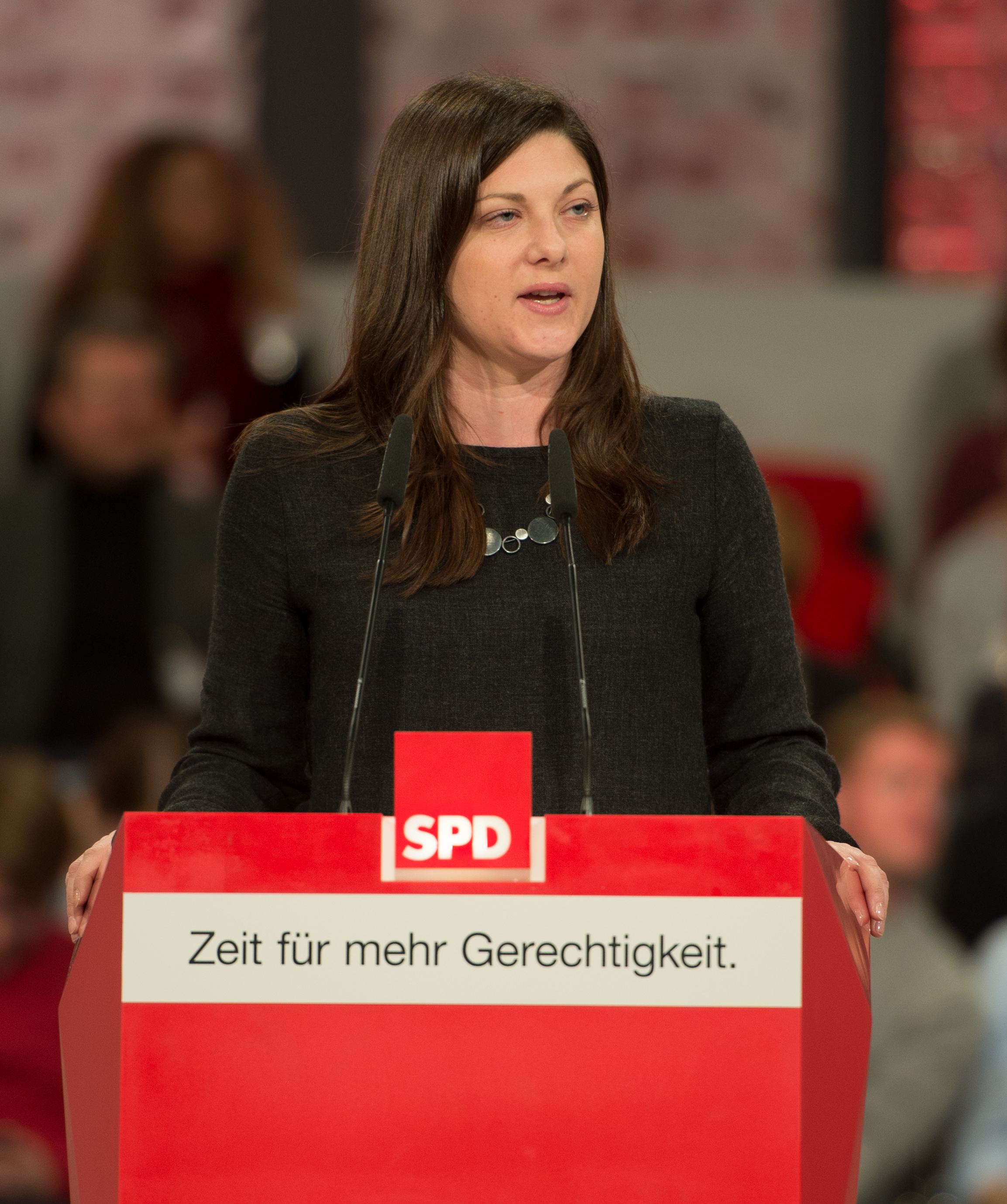

Deputy Leader of the Social Democratic Party in Bavaria
- Incumbent
- Assumed office 20 May 2017
- Leader: Natascha Kohnen
- Preceded by: Annette Karl

Leader of the Young Socialists
- In office 6 December 2013 – November 2017
- Preceded by: Sascha Vogt
- Succeeded by: Kevin Kühnert

Personal details
- Born: 18 September 1987 (age 39) Straubing, West Germany
- Party: SPD

Johanna Uekermann (born 18 September 1987) is a German politician of the Social Democratic Party (SPD). She served as chairwoman of the Young Socialists in the SPD (Jusos) from 2013 to 2017 and as Deputy Leader of the SPD Bayern from 2017 until 2021

== Early life ==
Uekermann was born in 1987 in the Bavarian city of Straubing. She is the daughter of two social-democratic teachers and grew up near Mitterfels.

== Political career ==
Uekermann joined Jusos when she was 14 years old. In 2009, she was elected as vice-chairwoman of the Bavarian Jusos, and in 2011 as vice-chairwoman of the German Jusos. In 2013, she ran for the Bundestag elections and reached 17.6 percent of the vote in the electoral district of Straubing against the CSU candidate Alois Rainer. At the German congress of the Jusos on 6 December 2013 in Nuremberg, she was elected as chairwoman of the German Jusos with 207 of 296 votes. In the local elections on 16 March 2014, she was elected into the district council of Straubing-Bogen. In 2015, she was re-elected as chairwoman of the Jusos for two more years with 72.3 percent of the vote.

From 2017 until 2021, Uekermann served as deputy chairwoman of the SPD in Bavaria, under the leadership of Natascha Kohnen. In 2018 she was a candidate for a seat in the Landtag of Bavaria.

Together with Niels Annen, Martin Dulig, Oliver Kaczmarek, Gabriele Lösekrug-Möller and Anke Rehlinger, Uekermann co-chaired the SPD’s 2019 national convention in Berlin, during which the party elected Saskia Esken and Norbert Walter-Borjans as its new leaders.

== Other activities ==
- Friends of the Willy Brandt Center Jerusalem (WBC), Member
- German United Services Trade Union (ver.di), Member
