= Katrin Ebner-Steiner =

German politician (born 1978)

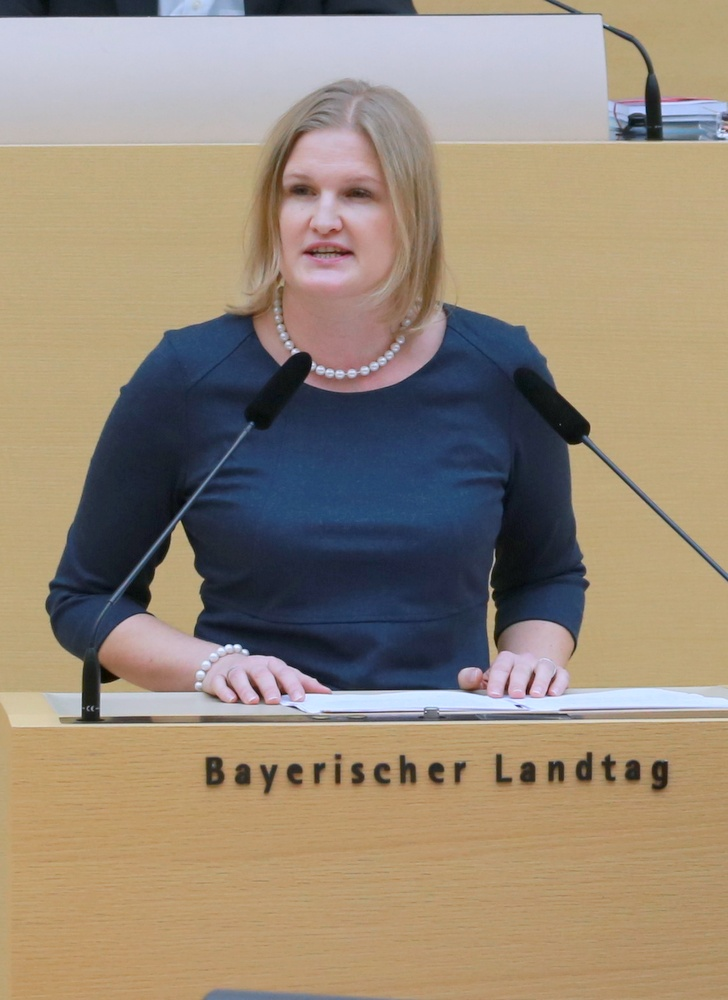
- Ebner-Steiner in 2018

Member of the Landtag of Bavaria
- Incumbent
- Assumed office 5 November 2018

Personal details
- Born: 26 August 1978 (age 47) Deggendorf, West Germany
- Party: AfD
- Children: 4

Katrin Ebner-Steiner (born 26 August 1978) is a German politician. She represents the Alternative for Germany (AfD) party and is former chair of the AfD in the Bavarian state parliament.

== Life ==
Ebner-Steiner is a trained accountant.

She is married and has four children.

== Politics ==
She failed several times in her candidacy for state chairmanship of AfD Bavaria, and also ran unsuccessfully for the Bundestag. In 2018 she was elected to the Bavarian state parliament on the AfD Party list.

Under Ebner-Steiner, the AfD faction in the state parliament increasingly split into two hostile camps. A total of five MPs resigned from the parliamentary group. In 2021, she and her colleague Ingo Hahn were voted out as parliamentary group leaders.

Ebner-Steiner belongs to the völkisch fraction within AfD, formerly organized in "Der Flügel". She has strong ties to Björn Höcke.
