= List of Christian Social Union of Bavaria politicians =

A list of notable politicians of the Christian Social Union in Bavaria (CSU):

== A ==
- Manfred Ach
- Heinrich Aigner
- Ilse Aigner
- Katrin Albsteiger
- Max Allwein
- Walter Althammer
- Hans Amler
- Erwin Ammann
- Johann Anetseder
- Willi Ankermüller
- Anton von Aretin
- Klaus P. Arnold
- Artur Auernhammer

== B ==
- Günther Babel
- Martin Bachhuber
- Georg Bachmann
- Rudolf Bachmann
- Margarete Balk
- Siegfried Balke
- Siegfried Balleis
- Dorothee Bär
- Christian Baretti
- Georg Barfuß
- Norbert Barthle
- Richard Bartsch
- Julia Bartz
- Josef Bauer
- Friedrich Bauereisen
- Marie Baum
- Wilhelm Baumann
- Leonhard Baumeister
- Gertrud Bäumer
- Joseph Baumgartner
- Jürgen Baumgärtner
- Elisabeth Bauriedel
- Winfried Bausback
- Alfred Bayer
- Konstantin Prinz von Bayern
- Martin Bayerstorfer
- Walter Becher
- Pia Beckmann
- Günther Beckstein
- Eric Beißwenger
- Rupert Berger
- Mathilde Berghofer-Weichner
- Otmar Bernhard
- Christian Bernreiter
- Anton Besold
- Karl Bickleder
- Annemarie Biechl
- Alfred Biehle
- Renate Blank
- Gerhard Bletschacher
- Markus Blume
- Reinhold Bocklet
- Hans Bodensteiner
- Johann Böhm (CSU)
- Stefan Bosse
- Wolfgang Bötsch
- Uwe Brandl
- Georg Brauchle
- Luitpold Braun
- Sebastian Brehm
- Klaus Dieter Breitschwert
- Gudrun Brendel-Fischer
- Maximilian Brückner
- Helmut Brunner
- Waltraud Bundschuh
- Peter Bürgel
- Ralph Burkei

== C ==
- Roland Cantzler
- Manfred Christ

== D ==
- Wolfgang Dandorfer
- Valentin Dasch
- Peter Deeg
- Josef Deimer
- Leonhard Deininger
- Maria Deku
- Franz Josef Delonge
- Marianne Deml
- Hans Demmelmeier
- Günther Denzler
- Albert Deß
- Petra Dettenhöfer
- Alfred Dick
- Matthias Dießl
- Paul Diethei
- Anton Dietrich
- Ernst Dietz
- Adolf Dinglreiter
- Stefan Dittrich
- Konrad Dobler
- Alexander Dobrindt
- Renate Dodell
- Karl Döhler
- Christian Doleschal
- Werner Dollinger
- Anton Donhauser
- Heinz Donhauser
- Toni Donhauser
- Hans Drachsler
- Alfred Dreier
- Hülya Düber
- Hansjörg Durz

== E ==
- Rudolf Eberhard
- Gerhard Eck
- Walter Eckhardt
- Kurt Eckstein
- Ralph Edelhäußer
- Hans Ehard
- Georg Ehnes
- Gottfried Eichelbrönner
- Maria Eichhorn
- Hans Eisenmann
- Georg Eisenreich
- Peter Eismann
- Alexander Engelhard
- Rudolf Engelhard
- Martina Englhardt-Kopf
- Matthias Engelsberger
- Thomas Erndl
- Egon Erzum
- Herbert Ettengruber
- Walter Eykmann

== F ==
- Bernd Fabritius
- Georg Fahrenschon
- Kurt Faltlhauser
- Hermann Fellner
- Markus Ferber
- Adolf Fetsch
- Otto Freiherr von Feury
- Ingrid Fickler
- Conrad Fink
- Martin Fink
- Max Fischer
- Herbert Frankenhauser
- Ludwig Franz
- Max Frauendorfer
- Karl Freller
- Astrid Freudenstein
- Heinrich Frey
- Walburga Fricke
- Hans-Peter Friedrich
- Ingo Friedrich
- Michael Frieser
- Klaus-Dieter Fritsche
- Otto Frommknecht
- Gustav Fuchs
- Karl Fuchs
- Joseph-Ernst Graf Fugger von Glött
- Friedrich Funk
- Albert Füracker
- Elimar Freiherr von Fürstenberg

== G ==
- Peter Gauweiler
- Hugo Geiger
- Norbert Geis
- Ingeborg Geisendörfer
- Jonas Geissler
- Judith Gerlach
- Franz Gleissner
- Michael Glos
- Alois Glück
- Josef Göppel
- Alfons Goppel
- Thomas Goppel
- Kurt Gribl
- Enoch zu Guttenberg
- Karl Theodor Freiherr von und zu Guttenberg
- Karl-Theodor zu Guttenberg
- Petra Guttenberger

== H ==
- Otto von Habsburg
- Georg Hackl
- Christine Haderthauer
- Florian Hahn
- Franz Handlos
- Gerda Hasselfeldt
- August Haußleiter
- Georg Graf Henckel von Donnersmarck
- Florian Herrmann
- Joachim Herrmann
- Franz Heubl
- Friedrich August von der Heydte
- Susanne Hierl
- Hermann Höcherl
- Michael Hofmann
- Monika Hohlmeier
- Heinz Hohner
- Klaus Holetschek, de:Klaus Holetschek
- Erwin Huber
- Ludwig Huber (politician), de:Ludwig Huber (Politiker, 1928)
- Martin Huber
- Alois Hundhammer

== I ==
- Erich Irlstorfer

== J ==
- Richard Jaeger
- Max Jüngling

== K ==
- Bartholomäus Kalb
- Michaela Kaniber
- Alois Karl
- Martin Kastler
- Erwin Georg Keilholz
- Ignaz Kiechle
- Erich Kiesl
- Michael Kießling
- Hans Klein
- Martina Klement
- Manuel Knoll
- Hartmut Koschyk
- Rudolf Kraus
- Thomas Kreuzer, de:Thomas Kreuzer (Politiker)

== L ==
- Carljörg Lacherbauer
- Heinrich Lades
- Wilhelm Laforet, de:Wilhelm Laforet
- August Lang de:August Lang (Politiker)
- Ulrich Lange
- Silke Launert
- Hans Ritter von Lex
- Daniela Ludwig

== M ==
- Georg von Manteuffel-Szoege
- Stephan Mayer
- Alfred Mechtersheimer
- Reiner Meier
- Georg Meixner, de:Georg Meixner
- Peter Menacher
- Philipp Meyer
- Benjamin Miskowitsch
- Marlene Mortler
- Gerd Müller
- Hans Müller
- Helmut Müller
- Josef Müller
- Nikolaus Müller

== N ==
- Angelika Niebler
- Wilhelm Niklas

== O ==
- Florian Oßner
- Melanie Oßwald
- Eduard Oswald

== P ==
- Hans-Jürgen Papier
- Gabriele Pauli
- Heinrich von Pierer
- Stephan Pilsinger
- Friedrich Wilhelm von Prittwitz und Gaffron
- Bernd Posselt
- Josef Prentl
- Albert Probst
- Maria Probst

== R ==
- Alexander Radwan
- Alois Rainer
- Hans Rampf
- Peter Ramsauer
- Hans Reichhart
- Bolko von Richthofen
- Erich Riedl
- Franz Rieger
- Hannelore Roedel
- Sebastian von Rotenhan

== S ==
- Maria-Elisabeth Schaeffler
- Fritz Schäffer
- Hans Schaidinger
- Ulrike Scharf
- Karl Scharnagl
- Franz-Ludwig Schenk Graf von Stauffenberg
- Gerhard Scheu
- Andreas Scheuer
- Ursula Schleicher
- Georg Schmid, de:Georg Schmid (Politiker)
- Peter Schmidhuber
- Christian Schmidt
- Oscar Schneider
- Siegfried Schneider
- Martin Schöffel
- Ludwig Scholz
- Karlheinz Schreiber
- Kerstin Schreyer
- Hans Schuberth
- Horst Seehofer
- Hanns Seidel
- Alfred Seidl
- Hans Joachim Sewering
- Bernd Sibler
- Johannes Singhammer
- Markus Söder
- Carl-Dieter Spranger
- Karl Graf von Spreti
- Barbara Stamm
- Georg Stang
- Heinz Starke
- Franz-Ludwig Schenk Graf von Stauffenberg
- Gabriele Stauner
- Wolfgang Stefinger
- Adam Stegerwald
- Christa Stevens, de:Christa Stevens
- Edmund Stoiber
- Stephan Stracke
- Hermann Strathmann
- Max Straubinger
- Franz Josef Strauß
- Max Streibl
- Richard Stücklen

== T ==
- Gerold Tandler
- Gloria von Thurn und Taxis

== U ==
- Hans-Peter Uhl

== V ==
- Steffen Vogel

== W ==
- Theo Waigel
- Kristan von Waldenfels
- Jürgen Warnke
- Manfred Weber
- Otto Weinkamm
- Anja Weisgerber
- Manfred Weiß
- Otto Wiesheu
- Wolfgang Wild
- Paul Wilhelm
- Josef Wintrich
- Fritz Wittmann
- Mechthilde Wittmann
- Dagmar Wöhrl
- Joachim Wuermeling

== Z ==
- Tobias Zech
- Hans Zehetmair
- Emmi Zeulner
- Franz Ziegler
- Friedrich Zimmermann
- Wolfgang Zöller
- Gudrun Zollner
