= Donhauser =

Donhauser is a surname. Notable people with the surname include:

- Anton Donhauser (1913–1987), German politician
- Christian Donhauser (1894–1919), German World War I flying ace
- Heinz Donhauser (born 1951), German politician
- Toni Donhauser (1921–1990), German politician
