= Eisman =

Eisman is a surname. Notable people with the surname include:

- Harry Eisman (1913–1979), American deported to the USSR in the 1930s
- Hy Eisman (1927–2025), American cartoonist
- Steve Eisman (born 1962), American money manager

== See also ==
- Eismann
