= Alexander Radwan =

German politician (born 1964)

Alexander Radwan MdB
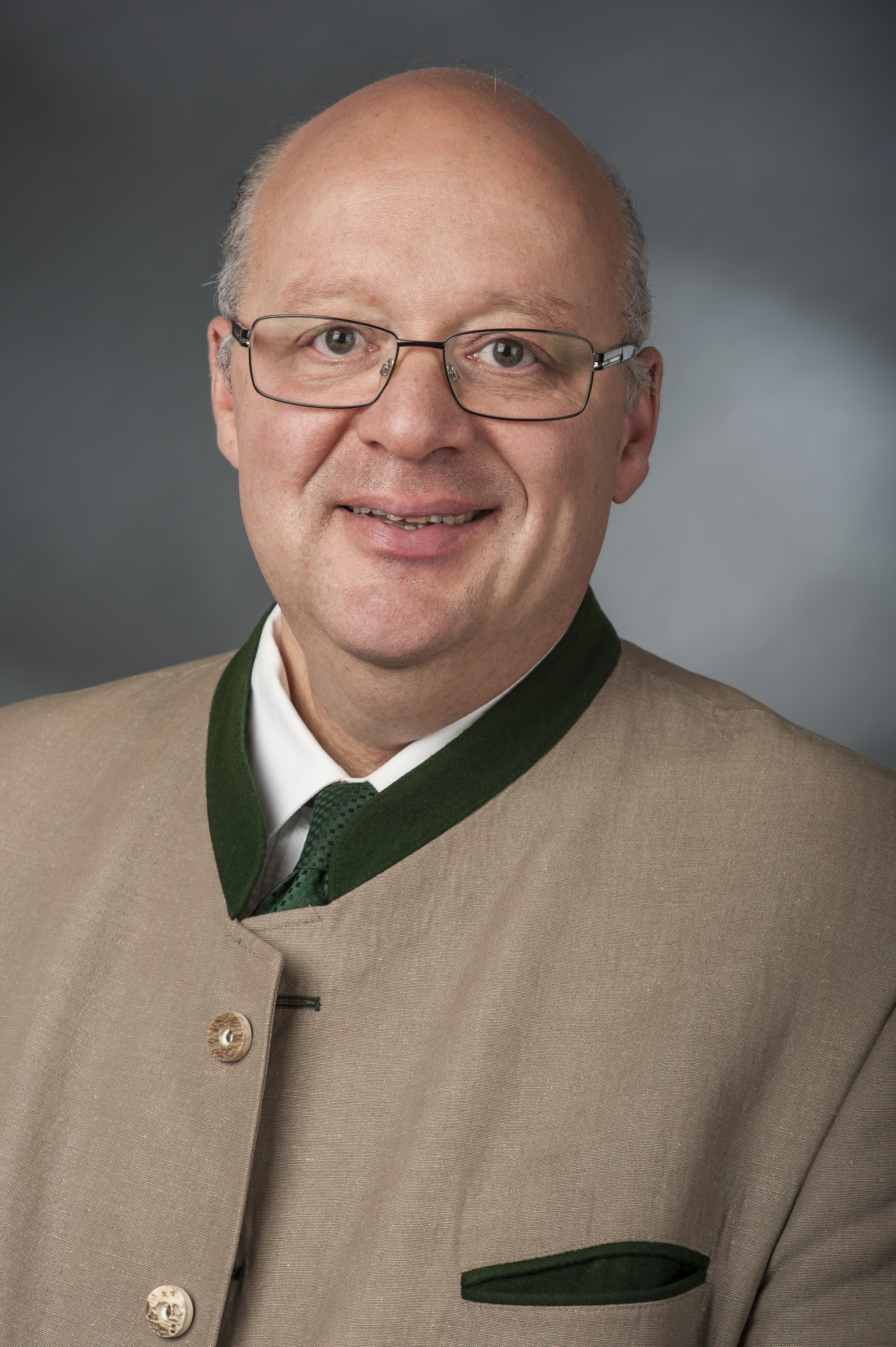
- Radwan in 2014

Member of the Bundestag
- Incumbent
- Assumed office 22 October 2013
- Preceded by: Ilse Aigner
- Constituency: Starnberg (2013–2017); Bad Tölz-Wolfratshausen – Miesbach (2017–present)

Member of the Landtag of Bavaria; for Miesbach
- In office 2013–2018
- Preceded by: Martin Fink
- Succeeded by: Ilse Aigner

Member of the European Parliament; for Germany
- In office 20 July 1999 – 2 December 2008
- Preceded by: Multi-member district
- Succeeded by: Martin Kastler

Personal details
- Born: 30 August 1964 (age 61) Munich, West Germany
- Party: Christian Social Union; European People's Party
- Profession: Lawyer

Alexander Gamal Radwan (born 30 August 1964) is a German politician.

== Early life and education ==
Radwan studied automotive engineering, specializing in aircraft, at the Munich University of Applied Sciences, graduated in 1987, with a degree in engineering. He then studied law, taking the second state examination, at LMU Munich in 1995. In same year, he was admitted to the bar. Until 1999, he was employed as a department head, of an international company in the information and telecommunications sector.

== Political career ==
=== Career in local politics ===
- 1989–1994: District Chairman of the Junge Union in Miesbach
- 1994–1999: District Chairman of the Junge Union of Upper Bavaria
- Member of local, district and regional executives of the CSU
- District Chairman of the Upper Bavaria Small Business Union and Vice-Chairman for Bavaria
- Member of the Miesbach District Council

=== Member of the European Parliament (1999–2008) ===
Between 1999 and 2008, Radwan was a Member of the European Parliament for Bavaria with the Christian Social Union in Bavaria, Member of the Bureau of the European People's Party and sat on the European Parliament's Committee on Economic and Monetary Affairs.

He was a substitute for the Committee on Legal Affairs and a vice-chair of the Delegation for relations with the Mashreq countries. Between 2004 and 2008, he was the EPP parliamentary group’s spokesperson on economic affairs.

=== Member of the Bavarian State Parliament (2008–2013) ===
In the 2008 Bavarian state elections, Radwan was elected to the Landtag of Bavaria. During his term in office, he served on the Committee on Budgetary and Finance Affairs as well as on the Committee on Federal and European Affairs. Within his parliamentary group, he was a member of the working group on defence policy.

In late 2012, Radwan and Ilse Aigner, who was about to leave national politics to run for state office, announced that they would switch electoral districts. As a consequence, Radwan took over Aigner’s district and ran for a seat in the Bundestag.

=== Member of the German Bundestag (2013–present) ===
Radwan has been a member of the German Bundestag since the 2013 federal elections. He has since been serving on the Finance Committee, the Committee on Foreign Affairs and its Subcommittee on the United Nations, International Organizations and Globalization. In addition, he is a member of the parliament’s delegation to the Parliamentary Assembly of the Mediterranean.

As member of the Committee on Foreign Affairs, Radwan serves as his parliamentary group’s rapporteur on relations with the Middle East, the Maghreb and Sudan. On the Finance Committee, he is the group’s rapporteur on the Euro and the banking union.

== Other activities ==
After serving as Of counsel with the Munich office of law firm GSK Stockmann + Kollegen until 2015, Radwan and former finance minister Theo Waigel joined Waigel Rechtsanwälte in 2016.

In addition to his legal practice, Radwan holds the following positions:

- German-Mozambican Society, Member of the Advisory Board
- Kangaroo Group, Member
