= Osswald =

Osswald or Oßwald may refer to:

- Albert Osswald (1919–1996), German politician
- Fritz Osswald (1878-1966), Swiss painter
- Laura Osswald (born 1982), German actress
- Melanie Oßwald (born 1976), German politician
- Paul Oßwald (1905–1993), German football player and manager
