= Siegfried Balleis =

German politician

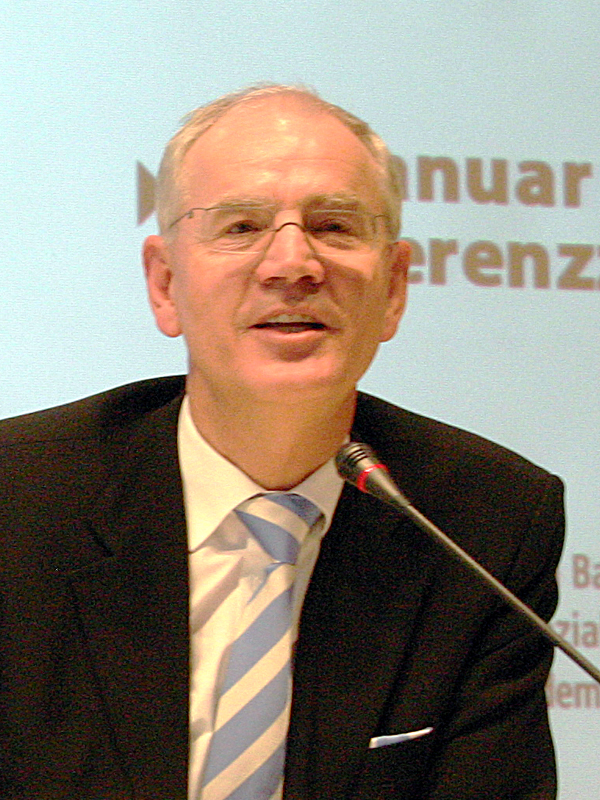
- Siegfried Balleis.

Mayor of Erlangen
- In office 1996-2014

Personal details
- Born: August 4, 1953 (age 71)
- Political party: CSU

Siegfried Balleis (born August 4, 1953) is a German politician, representative of the Christian Social Union of Bavaria.

In 1996 he was elected Oberbürgermeister for the town of Erlangen. He was in office until April 2014. From 1982 to 1993 he was married to Gabriele Pauli.

== See also ==
- List of Bavarian Christian Social Union politicians
