= Anton von Aretin =

German politician

Anton von Aretin (15 August 1918 in Munich – 12 June 1981 in Aldersbach) was a German politician, representative of the Bavaria Party and the Christian Social Union of Bavaria (CSU). He was also a member of the Landtag of Bavaria.

== Life and career ==
Von Aretin was born into the noble household of Aretin and was the son of Erwein Freiherr von Aretin (1887–1952), chief editor for the prominent Münchner Neueste Nachrichten newspaper, and Countess Maria Anna von Belcredi (1888–1968). He was the eldest of three brothers: Sebastian (1921–1945), the historian Karl Otmar (1923–2014), and the Jesuit Richard Freiherr von Aretin (1926–2006). He was also the cousin of Annette von Aretin and the great-great-great-nephew of the renowned Bavarian historian and librarian Johann Christoph Freiherr von Aretin.

After completing his secondary education exams at the Wilhelmsgymnasium in Munich he studied law in Munich and Prague. From 1941 until 1946 he was in exile in Iceland owing to the events of World War II.

In 1946 he first became a member of the CSU. In spring of 1947 he, alongside Anton Donhauser and other members and functionaries, left the CSU for the Bavaria Party. This was due to disappointment with the Schäffer-Hundhammer-wing of the CSU not having been able to implement enough policies focused upon Bavaria-centric issues. Within the same year he became the regional chairman of the Bavaria Party in Niederbayern.

From 1949 until 1953 von Aretin was a member of the German Parliament, in which he represented the Bayern Party. From 14 December 1951 the Bayern Party would go on to form the Föderalistische Union faction with the Centre Party (Germany). He was later a member of the Landtag of Bavaria from 1950 until 2 May 1951, in which he represented the locality of Vilshofen an der Donau.

From 1954 until his sudden death, he worked for Aldersbach brewery and supposedly contributed to their success. In 1969 he married the Austrian Johanna Colloredo-Mansfeld (1923–2010).

== See also ==
- List of Bavarian Christian Social Union politicians

== Sources ==
- Deutscher Bundestag (Hrsg.): Datenhandbuch zur Geschichte des Deutschen Bundestages von 1949 bis 1999. Eine Veröffentlichung der Wissenschaftlichen Dienste des Deutschen Bundestages. Nomos, Baden-Baden, ISBN 3-7890-5928-5.
- Rudolf Vierhaus, Ludolf Herbst (Hrsg.), Bruno Jahn (Mitarb.): Biographisches Handbuch der Mitglieder des Deutschen Bundestages. 1949–2002. Bd. 1: A–M. K. G. Saur, München 2002, ISBN 3-598-23782-0, P. 18.
