= Baretti =

Baretti may refer to:

== People ==
- Christian Baretti (born 1973), German politician
- Giuseppe Marc'Antonio Baretti (1719–1789), Italian literary critic, poet, and writer

== Other ==
- Il Baretti, Italian literary magazine
- Punta Baretti, mountain in the Mont Blanc Massif in the Val d'Aosta, Italy
