= Martin Fink =

Martin Fink may refer to:

- Martin Fink (politician), German politician
- Martin Fink (footballer), Swiss footballer
- Martin Fink, producer of the film Stunt Rock
