= Olympiastadion (Munich) =

Stadium located in Munich, Germany

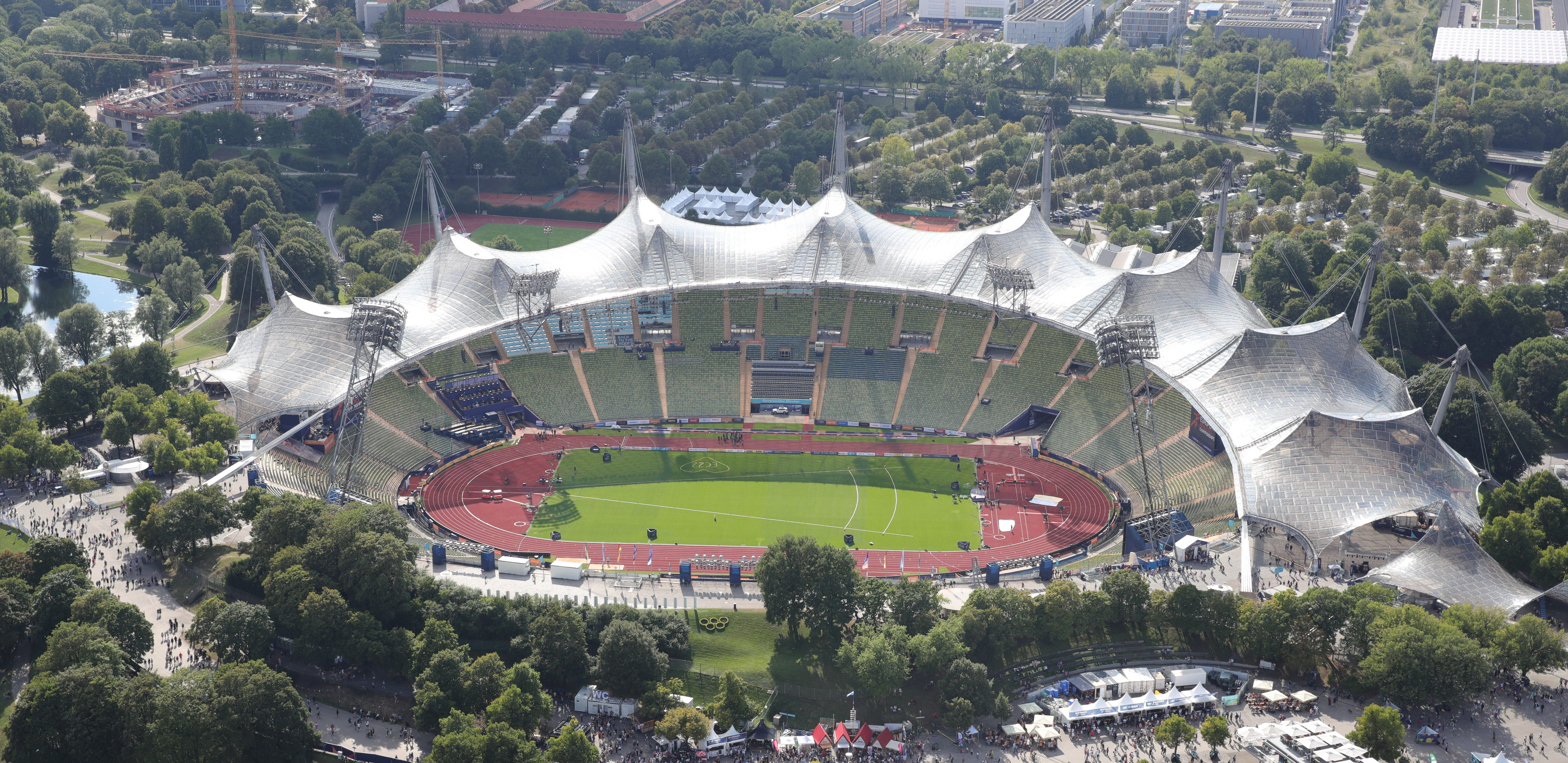
- The Munich Olympiastadion (2022)
- Interactive map of Olympiastadion
- Address: Olympiapark München, Spiridon-Louis-Ring 25, 80809
- Location: Munich, Germany
- Coordinates: 48°10′23″N 11°32′48″E
- Owner: City of Munich
- Operator: Olympiapark München GmbH
- Capacity: 63,118
- Surface: Asphalt concrete and artificial grass
- Screen: two 18.4 x 8 m
- Field size: 105 × 68 m
- Public transit: at Olympiazentrum

Construction
- Groundbreaking: 1968
- Opened: 26 May 1972; 54 years ago
- Architects: Frei Otto; Günter Behnisch; Leonhardt, Andrä und Partner

Tenants
- Bayern Munich (1972–2005); 1860 Munich (1972–2005); Türkgücü München (2020–2022); Germany national football team (selected matches)

Website
- Official website

Olympic Park Munich
Olympic Park Munich
1 Olympic Stadium
2 Olympic Hall
3 Theatron
4 Aquatic Center
5 Small Olympic Hall
6 Olympic Tower
7 Olympic Ice Sports Center
8 Olympic Village
9 SAP Garden
10 Olympic Mountain

Olympiastadion (German pronunciation: [ʔoˈlʏmpi̯aːˌʃtaːdi̯ɔn]) is a stadium located in Munich, Germany. Situated at the heart of the Olympiapark München in northern Munich, the stadium was built as the main venue for the 1972 Summer Olympics.

During the Olympics 70,824 tickets—including the unsaleable—were available for the events taking place in the stadium (including the opening and closing ceremonies). Yet, during the track and field competitions, average audiences of 80,000 to 90,000 people were estimated daily. Also, the stadium has hosted many major football matches including the 1974 FIFA World Cup Final and the UEFA Euro 1988 Final—due to up to 5,000 additional short-term stands, the football World Cup Final in 1974 was attended by 75,200 spectators. The stadium also hosted European Cup Finals in 1979, 1993 and 1997. Its current capacity is 63,118 seated spectators. The stadium has also hosted various concerts, with capacity up to 77,337 depending on configuration.

Until the construction of Allianz Arena for the 2006 FIFA World Cup, the stadium was home to Bayern Munich and 1860 Munich. Football is still played at this venue, which is usually used for the Landesliga Bayern-Südost club Türkgücü Munich. Unlike the Olympiastadion, the new stadium was purpose-built for football alone. The Olympiastadion continued to be Munich's main athletics stadium.

== Design ==
Designed by the German architect Günther Behnisch and the engineer Frei Otto, with the assistance of John Argyris, the lightweight tent construction of the Olympiastadion was considered revolutionary for its time. This included large sweeping canopies of acrylic glass stabilized by steel cables that were used for the first time on a large scale. The idea was to imitate the Alps skyline and to set a counterpoint to the 1936 Summer Olympics in Berlin, held during the Nazi regime. The sweeping and transparent canopy was designed to symbolize the new, democratic and optimistic West Germany. This concept was reflected in the official motto: "The cheerful Games" ("Die Heiteren Spiele").

== History ==
Shortly after World War I, there were first considerations to build a large stadium in Munich, as football gained popularity. A stadium construction on Oberwiesenfeld failed in 1919, due to an objection by the Bavarian state. In 1921, the Teutoniaplatz was opened by the club FC Teutonia, with a capacity of 12,000. In the month after the opening, about 20,000 guests came to a game, which was almost twice the officially allowed capacity. The FC Bayern used the Teutoniaplatz for his home games from 1923 to 1925. Starting in 1911, the TSV 1860 played on the club's own field at Grünwalder Straße in Giesing, which became the largest stadium in Munich after it was expanded to a capacity of 40,000 spectators in 1926.

Although the capacity was sufficient for championship operation, the Teutoniaplatz was filled to its limits in international matches: the game Germany against Switzerland in 1926 showed that the demand for tickets in major events was a much higher than the allowed capacity. The 1928 opened fight course on Dantestraße did not meet the expectations of a large stadium. For this reason, the construction of a large stadium on the outskirts of Munich, for example on Oberwiesenfeld, was discussed during the Weimar Republic, but did not yield any particular results.

In the early Nazi Germany, local politicians of the NSDAP planned the construction of a stadium west of Munich-Riem Airport with a capacity of 60,000 to 80,000, mirroring the Reichssportfeld in Berlin. However, the airport administration resisted and the Generalbaurat of Munich did not set it as a target. With the outbreak of World War II, the plans were finally rejected.

After the end of the war, the crowds flocked back to the football stadiums at weekends, including in Munich. In 1948, 58,200 spectators visited a game of TSV 1860 against 1. FC Nürnberg in the stadium on Grünwalder road, intended for only 45,000 visitors. A year later, 57,000 spectators came to Munich for the semi-final match of the German Championship between Kaiserslautern and Borussia Dortmund. The postwar period is today considered the "golden age" of football in Germany; only since the 1990s, have so many visitors come to the German stadiums.

The Grünwalder Stadion, which was destroyed in the war, offered space for 50,000 spectators after the renovation, making it the largest stadium in Munich. However, the Municipal Sports Committee considered the capacity to be too low and sought to expand it to a capacity of 75,000 spectators. The Sports Committee received backlash from local media. For example, the Münchner Merkur asked for the construction of a new stadium on the Oberwiesenfeld in early 1951, after the extended grandstand of the Grünwalder Stadium would have made the construction of the planned Mittlerer Ring as the main access road to the Federal Highway 8 difficult. The major stadium project came to an end with the adoption of the so-called ten-year program on 10 March 1955 which promoted the construction of district sports facilities.

Another reason for this decision was the decreased popularity of football in Munich, after the formerly successful city clubs such as TSV 1860, FC Wacker and FC Bayern underperformed. Because of the small capacity of the Grünwalder Stadium, games of the Germany national team had not been held in Munich since 1940. For the big city clubs, the capacity of the Grünwalder stadium was adequate.

In 1958, the Bavarian party revived the talks of a large stadium. Both FC Bayern and the TSV 1860 resisted the project, fearing that the capacity would not be exhausted anyway. In 1963, in the last season before the introduction of the Bundesliga, the TSV 1860 won the league championship and therefore secured the starting place in the first league for the following season. In the first Bundesliga season, the TSV 1860 had an average of just under 32,000 spectators per game, which far exceeded the average of the previous years of about 20,000. In 1964, the TSV 1860 qualified for the European Cup Winners' Cup 1964/65 by winning the DFB Cup in the preseason, and had constantly more than 30,000 spectators during the course of the competition. In the same year, the FC Bayern became champion of the Regionalliga Süd and qualified for the promotion round to the Bundesliga. The capacity of the Grünwalder Stadium once again proved to be too low. In the following season the TSV 1860 won the championship and FC Bayern the national cup competition. Although the average number of spectators was far lower than the maximum capacity of the Grünwalder Stadium, there were already numerous games in the mid-1960s at which the ticket demand was higher than the capacity of the stadium.

Munich was the only German city with two Bundesliga clubs, which at this time always played in the top table positions and were temporarily represented in international competitions. Therefore, the largest stadium in the city was now again found to be too small. In order to maintain the high level of the Munich football clubs, a larger stadium was considered necessary, because the audience still represented the main source of income of the clubs at that time.

Meanwhile, Georg Brauchle, then deputy Mayor of Munich, tried to bring the 1972 Summer Olympic Games to Munich. In October 1965, Mayor Hans-Jochen Vogel and Willi Daume, President of the West Germany National Olympic Committee, decided to test the city's suitability for the Games. After further talks, among others with Federal Chancellor Ludwig Erhard and Bavaria's Prime Minister Alfons Goppel, they came to the conclusion that an application for the 1972 Summer Olympics could be worthwhile. For this, however, a new and modern stadium had to be built for the city.

=== Planning ===
The three square kilometer and largely undeveloped Oberwiesenfeld was selected as the centerpiece of the Olympic Games. Due to the proximity to the city center, Munich was able to promote the games with the slogan "Olympia of the short ways", which contributed to the decision-making process. Since the Oberwiesenfeld had served as a parade ground of the Bavarian cavalry regiment and later mainly military purposes, it was – except for armaments works – free of buildings. From 1931 to 1939 the Munich Airport was located on the Oberwiesenfeld. After the World War II, the debris rubble of the bombing of the city was piled up, from which the Olympic Mountain emerged. This was intentionally created in an oval shape, so that it could be used as a tribune foundation for a stadium.

In 1964, Munich opened an architectural competition for the planning of a large stadium, which was won by the offices of Henschker from Brunswick and Deiss from Munich. Their stadium design was integrated into an overall concept. In the planning of 1965, the stadium was planned to hold around 100,000 spectators, although later the capacity was reduced for the purpose of reusability. The plans were integrated into an overall concept, with the addition of a multi-purpose arena and a swimming pool on a large, concrete surface. Under the concrete slabs, supply systems and parking lots were to be built. On 26 April 1966, the IOC announced that Munich had prevailed against the other candidates Detroit, Madrid and Montreal. Thus the stadium construction was decided. The original plans of the Olympic Park and the stadium were criticized because of a lack of unity in the urban planning. In addition, the Association of German Architects suggested to avoid any monumentality at the sports facilities because of the Nazi past. The plans were finally rejected.

In February 1967, an architectural competition was again advertised, in which by the deadline of 3 July 1967 a total of 104 drafts were submitted, one of which came from the architectural firm Behnisch & Partner. The architect Günter Behnisch and his employee Fritz Auer planned to build the stadium, the Olympic Hall and the swimming pool closely adjacent to each other west of the Olympic Tower, for which the base already existed. When a model was built at a scale of 1: 1000, the employee Cordel Wehrse came up with the idea of laying a tent roof construction over the three buildings. He had become aware of Frei Otto's tent roof construction at the World Fair in Montreal through a newspaper article. Together with Carlo Weber and Heinz Isler the model was supplemented with wooden sticks and parts of a women's stocking. The architects thought of the Olympic roof as a circus tent.

Finally, the model was submitted on the deadline. It was already eliminated after the first round by the jury, as it was considered too daring. However, the juror Egon Eiermann intervened and campaigned together with Mayor Hans-Jochen Vogel and NOK President Willi Daume, among others, for the model. Ultimately, the reviewers voted for the plan of Behnisch & Partner, which emerged as the winner of the competition. The decision was announced on 13 October 1967. In addition to the stadium designed for 90,000 spectators, which was then reduced to 70,824 during the Olympic Games. The model convinced with its surrounding landscape architecture and the tent roof construction. Thus, it fulfilled the leitmotif of the games: human scale, lightness, bold elegance and unity of the landscape with nature. In addition, the possibility of reuse was given. Even with regard to short distances, the model convinced the jury.

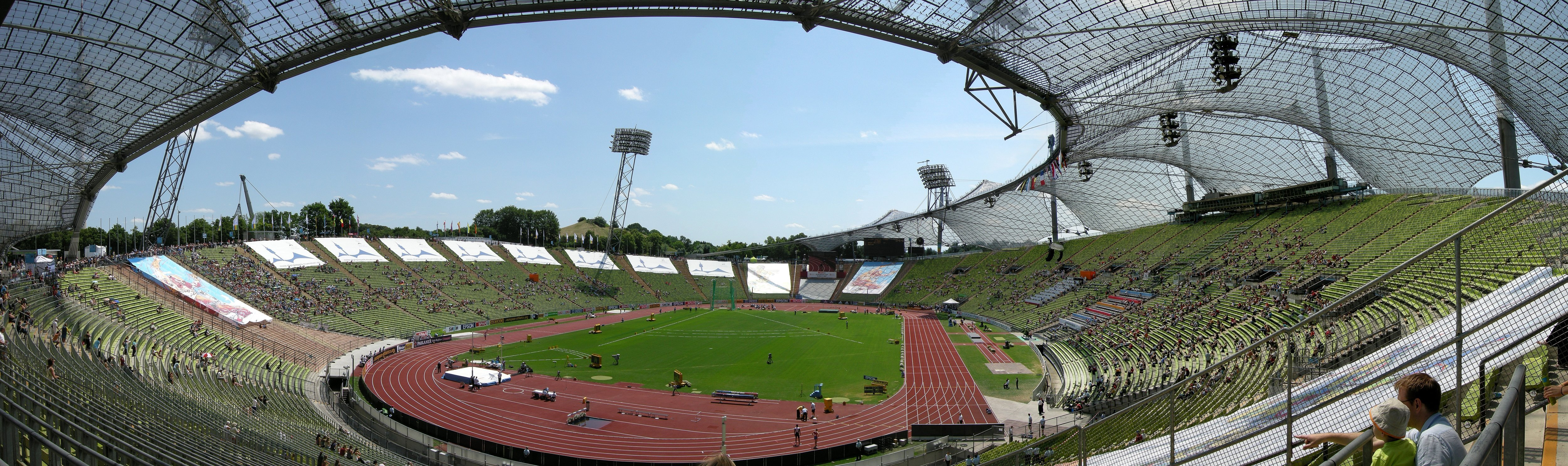
Panoramic view of the Münchener Olympiastadion

=== Erection ===
To make room for the arena, the terminal building of the old airport had to be blown up. On 9 June 1969 work began on the stadium, the multi-purpose Olympic arena and swimming pool. However, it was only on 14 July 1969 with the laying of the cornerstone in a symbolic ceremony that the construction officially begun. In addition to the three buildings emerging on the Oberwiesenfeld, the Werner von Linde Hall, a volleyball hall, the Olympic Radstadion, the Olympic Village and various other buildings such as stations for U-Bahn and S-Bahn were built. During the time of the construction there was a spirit of optimism in Munich. The inner city received a pedestrian zone between Marienplatz and the Stachus and the metro was implemented. on the Oberwiesenfeld alone, there were 60 construction sites. From a total of 1.35 billion German marks, 137 million were used in the construction of the Olympic Stadium and another 170.6 million in the tent roof. About 5,000 construction workers worked at the construction site for more than one million hours. Contrary to the custom of German construction, the Olympic Stadium was built largely without prefabricated parts.

According to Behnisch, the stadium was to be a "democratic sports venue" according to the ideas of the Mayor of Munich Hans-Jochen Vogel and the specifications of the Federal Chancellor Willy Brandt, creating a contrast to the 1936 Summer Olympics in Berlin during the period of National Socialism, the hitherto single summer Olympics in Germany. Since the time of National Socialism, Munich had the reputation of being the "capital of the Nazi movement". The Olympics were intended to help improve Munich's reputation. The foundation's deed stated that the planned games should "bear witness to the spirit of our people in the last third of the 20th century".

Behnisch wanted Frei Otto as a partner architect, whose tent roof construction at the EXPO 1967 in Montreal was a model for the stadium tent roof. Otto had already been involved in numerous construction projects with suspended and membrane structures and became the development consultant for the Olympiastadion tent roof construction. In addition to Behnisch and Otto, an architect team was also formed to realize the roof construction, including Fritz Leonhardt and Wolf Andrä. The planning management was done by Fritz Auer. Otto developed parts of the roof by means of the trial-and-error principle by making larger models of the roof construction, while Andrä and Leonhardt developed the roof with a CAD program elsewhere. Under the direction of civil engineer Jörg Schlaich, the roof over the stadium was completed on 21 April 1972. Originally, the roof covered almost 45,000 seats - now it is less than 40,000. Plans to cover an additional 15,000 seats in the eastern stands of the stadium - for the Olympic Games, respectively the football World Cup 1974 in West Germany - with a separate tent roof were initially developed by Behnisch and his architectural team from 1964 to 1967. But the additional roof was never completed; only the two main foundations to hold the roof were built, and they are still visible; one in each of the curves: behind, respectively under the existing roof. (In total some 60,000 seats would have been covered by the two separate tent roofs.)

Already in the summer of 1970 the shell of the buildings was finished and on 23 July 1970 the topping-out ceremony was celebrated. The plans for the stadium had forgotten to allocate cabins for football teams in the stadium interior. For this reason, from 24 May 1972 to the official opening of the stadium on 26 May 1972, two medical rooms were provisionally converted into changing rooms. There was enough room to set up a room for paramedics and referees as well. Later, the cabins were further equipped and remained in place. At the turn of the year 1971/1972 the main works were finished and at the end of June 1972 the finished buildings were handed over to the organizing committee. The planning, construction and financing of the buildings were controlled by the 1967 founded Olympia-Baugesellschaft mbH Munich, which was founded by the Federal Republic of Germany, the Free State of Bavaria and the City of Munich. The stadium is property of the Olympiapark München GmbH, a society wholly owned by the City of Munich's Referat für Arbeit und Wirtschaft.

=== Post Olympic legacy ===
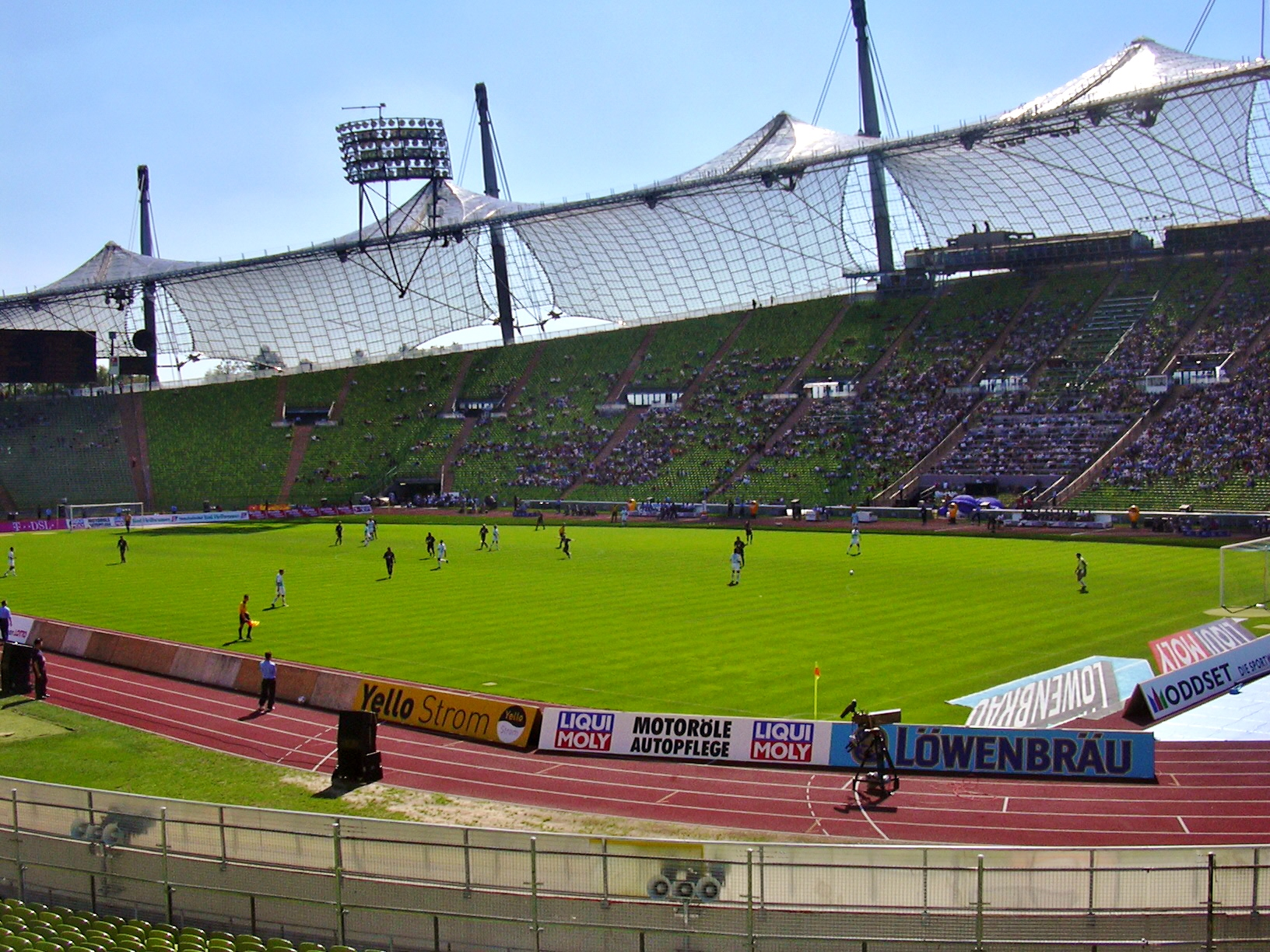
TSV 1860 München football match

Following the Olympics, the stadium became the home of FC Bayern Munich. In 1979 the ground was host to the 1979 European Cup Final in which Nottingham Forest won the first of their consecutive European Cups.

In the 1990s Bayern Munich's rivals TSV 1860 Munich moved into the stadium. The two teams coexisted in the Olympiastadion until 2005, when both clubs moved to the purpose built Allianz Arena.

Borussia Dortmund won the 1997 UEFA Champions League Final at the Olympiastadion.

In 2011 and 2012, there were non-championship DTM events hosted in the Olympiastadion.

On 6 to 11 August 2002 the 18th European Athletics Championships were held at the Olympiastadion.

Since 2005, it is the host of the yearly air and style snowboard event.

On 31 December 2006, the stadium made history as being the first venue to host the Tour de Ski cross-country skiing competition. The individual sprint events, held at 1100 m, were won by Norway's Marit Bjørgen (women) and Switzerland's Christoph Eigenmann (men). The snow was made in the stadium by combining the hot air with the cold refrigerated water that causes the snow to act like the icy type one would see in the Alps.

It was not used in the 2006 FIFA World Cup due to the Allianz Arena being the host stadium in Munich.

On 23 to 24 June 2007, the stadium was host to the Spar European Cup 2007, a yearly athletics event featuring the top 8 countries from around Europe.

The DTM touring car series held its first stadium event there in 2011: a Race of Champions-style event which took part over a two-day period, although it was not a championship scoring round. Edoardo Mortara won the first day, and Bruno Spengler the second. The event was repeated in 2012, but the stadium withdrew in 2013 because it proved impossible to turn it into a points-scoring event.

On 17 May 2012, the ground played host to the 2012 UEFA Women's Champions League Final in which Olympique Lyonnais won their second consecutive trophy. The attendance of that game was a record for a UEFA Women's Champions League Final. On 19 May 2012 it hosted the "Public Viewing" of the 2012 UEFA Champions League Final which took place at Allianz Arena in Munich.

In August 2020, it was announced that Türkgücü München, who had been promoted into the third division would be playing a couple of their home matches on the ground. On 10 October 2020, after more than eight years, Olympiastadion was due to host a professional football match of Türkgücü München against SV Wehen Wiesbaden.

The 2022 European Athletics Championships took place at the stadium.

== Association football ==
=== 1974 FIFA World Cup ===
The stadium was one of the venues for the 1974 FIFA World Cup.

The following games were played at the stadium during the World Cup of 1974:

Date	Time (CEST)	Team #1	Res.	Team #2	Round	Spectators
15 June 1974	18.00	Italy	3–1	Haiti	Group 4	53,000
19 June 1974	19.30	Haiti	0–7	Poland	Group 4	25,300
23 June 1974	16.00	Argentina	4–1	Haiti	Group 4	25,900
6 July 1974	16.00	Brazil	0–1	Poland	Third place match	74,100
7 July 1974	16.00	Netherlands	1–2	West Germany	Final	75,200

=== UEFA Euro 1988 ===
The stadium was one of the venues for the UEFA Euro 1988.

The following games were played at the stadium during the Euro 1988:

Date	Time (CEST)	Team #1	Res.	Team #2	Round	Spectators
17 June 1988	20.15	West Germany	2–0	Spain	Group 1	63,802
25 June 1988	15.30	Soviet Union	0–2	Netherlands	Final	72,770

=== Germany and West Germany national football team ===
The stadium hosted German national football teams for a total of 14 games.

- 26 May 1972 West Germany – USSR 4–1 (Friendly, stadium opener)
- 14 February 1973 West Germany - Argentina 2-3 (Friendly)
- 9 May 1973 West Germany – Yugoslavia 0–1 (Friendly)
- 7 July 1974 West Germany – Netherlands 2–1 (1974 World Cup Final)
- 22 May 1976 West Germany – Spain 2–0 (Euro 1976 Qualifier)
- 22 February 1978 West Germany – England 2–1 (Friendly)
- 2 April 1980 West Germany – Austria 1–0 (Friendly)
- 22 September 1982 West Germany – Belgium 0–0 (Friendly)
- 17 November 1985 West Germany – Czechoslovakia 2–2 (1986 World Cup qualifier)
- 17 June 1988 West Germany – Spain 2–0 (Euro 1988 Group match)
- 19 October 1988 West Germany – Netherlands 0–0 (1990 World Cup qualifier)
- 26 March 1996 Germany – Denmark 2–0 (Friendly)
- 9 October 1999 Germany – Turkey 0–0 (Euro 2000 qualifier)
- 1 September 2001 Germany – England 1–5 (2002 World Cup qualifier)

=== UEFA Club Competition Finals ===
Date	Winners	Result	Runners-up	Round	Attendance
30 May 1979	(England) Nottingham Forest	1–0	(Sweden) Malmö FF	1979 European Cup final	58,500
26 May 1993	(France) Marseille	1–0	(Italy) Milan	1993 UEFA Champions League final	64,444
28 May 1997	(Germany) Borussia Dortmund	3–1	(Italy) Juventus	1997 UEFA Champions League final	59,000
17 May 2012	(France) Lyon	2–0	(Germany) Frankfurt	2012 UEFA Women's Champions League final	50,212

== Concerts ==
List of concerts at Olympiastadion, showing date, artist, tour and attendance
Date	Artist	Tour	Attendance
10 June 1982	The Rolling Stones	The Rolling Stones European Tour 1982	—
11 June 1982	The Rolling Stones	The Rolling Stones European Tour 1982	—
1985	Diana Ross	Swept Away Tour	—
18 June 1985	Bruce Springsteen	Born in the U.S.A. Tour	37,000
21 June 1987	Genesis	Invisible Touch Tour	—
3 July 1988	Pink Floyd	A Momentary Lapse of Reason Tour	—
8 July 1988	Michael Jackson	Bad	72,000
27 May 1990	Tina Turner	Foreign Affair: The Farewell Tour	—
2 June 1990	The Rolling Stones	Urban Jungle Tour	—
3 June 1990	The Rolling Stones	Urban Jungle Tour	—
14 June 1990	Prince	Nude Tour	52,900
27 June 1992	Michael Jackson	Dangerous World Tour	72,000
17 July 1992	Genesis	We Can't Dance Tour	—
4 June 1993	U2	Zoo TV Tour	—
26 June 1993	Guns N' Roses	Use Your Illusion Tour	—
4 August 1994	Pink Floyd	The Division Bell Tour	—
3 August 1995	The Rolling Stones	Voodoo Lounge Tour	67,509
25 May 1996	Sting	Mercury Falling 1996/97	—
26 May 1996	Dave Matthews Band	Summer 1996	—
4 July 1997	Michael Jackson	HIStory World Tour	150,000
6 July 1997	Michael Jackson	HIStory World Tour	150,000
14 June 1998	Elton John & Billy Joel	Face to Face 1998	—
13 July 1998	The Rolling Stones	Bridges to Babylon Tour	74,588
27 June 1999	Michael Jackson and various artists	MJ & Friends	—
3 July 1999	Celine Dion	Let's Talk About Love World Tour	57,479
23 July 2000	Tina Turner	Twenty Four Seven Tour	73,920
14 June 2001	AC/DC	Stiff Upper Lip World Tour	—
30 June 2001	Bon Jovi	One Wild Night Tour	—
6 June 2003	The Rolling Stones	Licks Tour	—
10 June 2003	Bruce Springsteen	The Rising Tour	—
13 June 2003	Bon Jovi	Bounce Tour	—
6 July 2003	Robbie Williams	2003 Tour	—
6 June 2004	Phil Collins	First Final Farewell Tour	—
13 June 2004	Metallica	Madly in Anger with the World Tour	—
28 July 2004	Simon & Garfunkel	Old Friends	—
3 August 2005	U2	Vertigo Tour	77,435
28 May 2006	Bon Jovi	Have A Nice Day Tour	71,467
16 July 2006	The Rolling Stones	A Bigger Bang	53,501
1 August 2006	Robbie Williams	Close Encounters Tour	—
2 August 2006	Robbie Williams	Close Encounters Tour	—
3 August 2006	Robbie Williams	Close Encounters Tour	—
29 June 2007	Red Hot Chili Peppers	Stadium Arcadium World Tour	—
10 July 2007	Genesis	Turn It On Again: The Tour	68,951
22 September 2007	The Police	The Police Reunion Tour	44,740
24 May 2008	Bon Jovi	Lost Highway Tour	70,473
22 June 2008	Celine Dion	Taking Chances Tour	20,000
15 May 2009	AC/DC	Black Ice World Tour	66,023
13 June 2009	Depeche Mode	Tour of the Universe	60,293
2 July 2009	Bruce Springsteen	Working on a Dream Tour	39,896
18 August 2009	Madonna	Sticky & Sweet Tour	35,127
15 September 2010	U2	U2 360° Tour	76,150
12 June 2011	Bon Jovi	Bon Jovi Live	68,025
29 July 2011	Take That	Progress Live	52,376
12 September 2012	Coldplay	Mylo Xyloto Tour	54,017
26 September 2012	Nickelback	Here and Now Tour	—
18 May 2013	Bon Jovi	Because We Can	64,284
26 May 2013	Bruce Springsteen	Wrecking Ball World Tour	41,579
1 June 2013	Depeche Mode	The Delta Machine Tour	62,976
7 August 2013	Robbie Williams	Take the Crown Stadium Tour	—
19 May 2015	AC/DC	Rock or Bust World Tour	140,000
21 May 2015	AC/DC	Rock or Bust World Tour	140,000
29 May 2015	Rockavaria Festival		—
30 May 2015	Rockavaria Festival		—
31 May 2015	Rockavaria Festival		—
17 June 2016	Bruce Springsteen	The River Tour 2016	54,119
7 August 2016	Rihanna	Anti World Tour	—
6 June 2017	Coldplay	A Head Full of Dreams Tour	62,548
9 June 2017	Depeche Mode	Global Spirit Tour	60,066
13 June 2017	Guns N' Roses	Not in This Lifetime... Tour	66,795
22 July 2017	Robbie Williams	The Heavy Entertainment Show Tour	—
12 September 2017	The Rolling Stones	No Filter Tour	72,637
29 July 2018	Ed Sheeran	÷ Tour	135,036
30 July 2018	Ed Sheeran	÷ Tour	135,036
8 June 2019	Rammstein	Europe Stadium Tour 2019	121,250
9 June 2019	Rammstein	Europe Stadium Tour 2019	121,250
24 June 2019	Phil Collins	Not Dead Yet Tour	38,723
26 July 2019	P!nk	Beautiful Trauma World Tour	113,564
27 July 2019	P!nk	Beautiful Trauma World Tour	113,564
23 August 2019	Metallica	WorldWired Tour	68,117
8 July 2022	Guns N' Roses	2020 Tour	61,920
10 September 2022	Ed Sheeran	+–=÷× Tour	200,184
11 September 2022	Ed Sheeran	+–=÷× Tour	200,184
12 September 2022	Ed Sheeran	+–=÷× Tour	200,184
17 May 2023	Harry Styles	Love On Tour	120,877
18 May 2023	Harry Styles	Love On Tour	120,877
7 June 2023	Rammstein	Europe Stadium Tour	—
8 June 2023	Rammstein	Europe Stadium Tour	—
10 June 2023	Rammstein	Europe Stadium Tour	—
11 June 2023	Rammstein	Europe Stadium Tour	—
20 June 2023	Depeche Mode	Memento Mori World Tour	66,564
5 July 2023	P!nk	Summer Carnival	—
6 July 2023	P!nk	Summer Carnival	—
23 July 2023	Bruce Springsteen	Bruce Springsteen & The E Street Band	—
4 August 2023	The Weeknd	After Hours til Dawn Tour	72,011
24 May 2024	Metallica	M72 World Tour	156,000
26 May 2024	Metallica	M72 World Tour	156,000
9 June 2024	AC/DC	Power Up Tour	—
12 June 2024	AC/DC	Power Up Tour	—
27 July 2024	Taylor Swift	The Eras Tour	148,000
28 July 2024	Taylor Swift	The Eras Tour	148,000
15 August 2024	Coldplay	Music of the Spheres World Tour	210,192
17 August 2024	Coldplay	Music of the Spheres World Tour	210,192
18 August 2024	Coldplay	Music of the Spheres World Tour	210,192
26 July 2025	Robbie Williams	Britpop Tour	—

== Other uses ==
The stadium was the setting of a skit for Monty Python's Flying Circus in 1972, for The Philosophers' Football Match, in which Greek Philosophers played German Philosophers (plus Franz Beckenbauer) and the Greeks winning the game with a last-minute goal from Socrates. However, the skit was filmed instead at the Grünwalder Stadion.

Parts of the 1975 film Rollerball were shot on the (then) futuristic site surrounding the stadium.

The Olympic Stadium also hosted Motorcycle speedway when it held the 1989 World Final on 2 September 1989. Denmark's Hans Nielsen won his third World Championship with a 15-point maximum from his five rides. Simon Wigg of England finished in second place after defeating countryman Jeremy Doncaster in a run-off to decide the final podium places after both had finished with 12 points from their five rides. Three time champion Erik Gundersen of Denmark finished in fourth place with 11 points. Gundersen, the defending World Champion, missed finishing outright second when his bike's engine expired while he was leading Heat 9 of the World Final.

American rock band Guns N' Roses filmed parts of their Estranged video there when they visited Munich in June 1993.

In 2021, the stadium was visited during the fourth episode of the ninth season of Belgian reality series De Mol for a football-themed assignment.

The stadium is also used for American football.

== See also ==
- Tensile and membrane structures

Events and tenants
Preceded by Estadio Olímpico Universitario; Mexico City	Summer Olympics; Opening and closing ceremonies (Olympic Stadium); 1972	Succeeded by Olympic Stadium; Montreal
Preceded by Estadio Olímpico Universitario; Mexico City	Summer Olympics; Athletic competitions Main venue 1972	Succeeded by Olympic Stadium; Montreal
Preceded by Estadio Azteca; Mexico City	Summer Olympics; Men's football final 1972	Succeeded by Olympic Stadium; Montreal
Preceded by Estadio Azteca; Mexico City	FIFA World Cup; Final venue 1974	Succeeded by Estadio Monumental Antonio Vespucio Liberti; Buenos Aires
Preceded by Wembley Stadium; London	European Cup; Final venue 1979	Succeeded by Santiago Bernabéu Stadium; Madrid
Preceded by Parc des Princes; Paris	UEFA European Championship; Final venue 1988	Succeeded by Ullevi; Gothenburg
Preceded by Wembley Stadium; London	UEFA Champions League; Final venue 1993	Succeeded by Olympic Stadium; Athens
Preceded by Stadio Olimpico; Rome	UEFA Champions League; Final venue 1997	Succeeded by Amsterdam Arena; Amsterdam
Preceded by Népstadion; Budapest	European Athletics Championships; Main venue 2002	Succeeded by Ullevi; Gothenburg
Preceded by Craven Cottage; London	UEFA Women's Champions League; Final venue 2012	Succeeded by Stamford Bridge; London
Preceded by Olympiastadion; Berlin	European Athletics Championships; Main venue 2022	Succeeded by
