= Erismann =

Erismann is a surname. Notable people with the surname include:

- Friedrich Erismann (1842–1915), Swiss ophthalmologist and hygienist
- Marianne Erismann (1930–2004), Swiss swimmer

== See also ==
- Eismann
