= Deml =

Czech surname

Deml (feminine: Demlová) is a Czech surname. It came to the Czech language as a derivation from the German surnames Temml and Themml, or from the old German given names Dagomar, Thiemo, Thomas, etc. A similar surname with the same etymology is Demel. Notable people with the surname include:

- Jakub Deml (1878–1961), Czech writer and priest
- Marianne Deml (born 1949), German politician
- Max Deml (born 1957), German-Austrian publisher and writer
- Nicholas J. Deml (born 1987), American attorney and government official
- Wolfgang Deml (born 1945), German entrepreneur
