= Peter Bürgel =

German politician

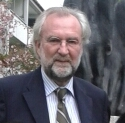
Peter Bürgel

Peter Bürgel (22 March 1953 – 8 July 2026) was a German politician, representative of the Christian Social Union of Bavaria (CSU).

He was a city councilor in his home town of Dachau from 1990 to 2002 and chairman of the CSU parliamentary group from 1996 to 2002. He was elected mayor of Dachau in 2002 and re-elected in 2008 and left office in 2014. In 2007 he was elected President of Bürgel EuroArt.

== See also ==
- List of Christian Social Union of Bavaria politicians
