= Max Allwein =

German politician and jurist

Max Allwein (December 18, 1904 – November 20, 1977) was a German politician and jurist. He was a representative of the Christian Social Union of Bavaria. He was born in Munich and died in Bad Tölz.

== See also ==
- List of Bavarian Christian Social Union politicians
