= Rudolf Bachmann =

German politician

Rudolf Bachmann (10 August 1925 in Westheim – 27 March 1998 in Gunzenhausen) was a German politician, representative of the Christian Social Union of Bavaria. He was a member of the Landtag of Bavaria. Between 1943 and 1946, Rudolf Bachmann did military service and was taken prisoner of war. From 1955, he took on the job of computer (today's bank clerk) in Westheim, after working at the Raiffeisenkasse from a young age.

== Honors ==
- 1980 Bavarian Order of Merit

== See also ==
- List of Bavarian Christian Social Union politicians
