= Winfried Bausback =

German politician

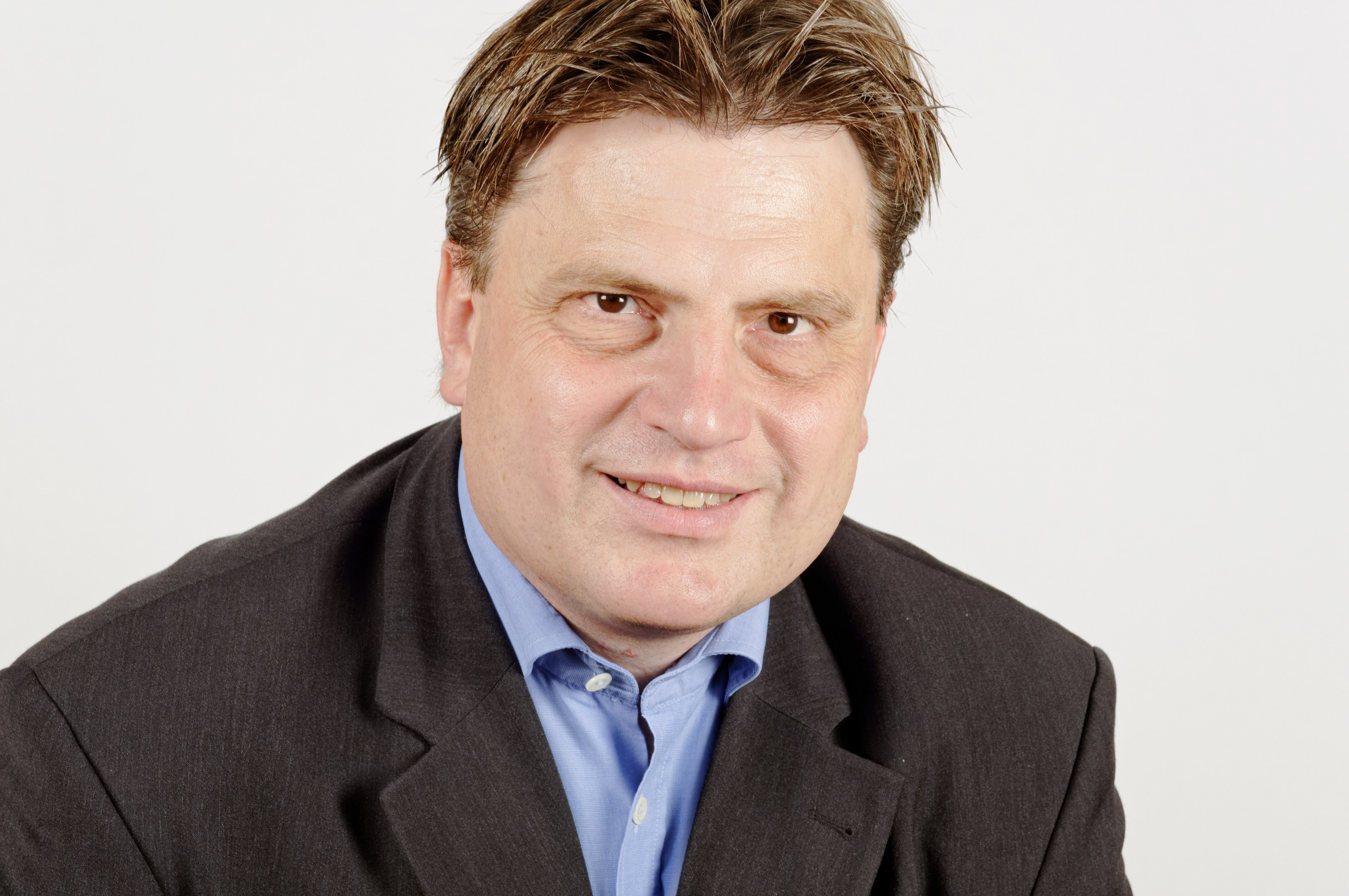
Winfried Bausback

Winfried Bausback (born 22 October 1965) is a German politician, representative of the Christian Social Union of Bavaria.

== Political career ==
Bausback is a member of the Landtag of Bavaria. Since 2008 he has represented Stimmkreis Aschaffenburg-West in the Landtag.

Following the 2013 state elections, Bausback was named State Minister of Justice in the government of Minister-President Horst Seehofer.

In the negotiations to form a Grand Coalition of the Christian Democrats and the Social Democrats (SPD) following the 2013 federal elections, Bausback was part of the CDU/CSU delegation in the working group on internal and legal affairs, led by Hans-Peter Friedrich and Thomas Oppermann.

== Other activities ==
- University of Würzburg, Member of the Board of Trustees

== See also ==
- List of Bavarian Christian Social Union politicians
