= Ingrid Fickler =

German jurist and politician

- Born: October 27, 1940 (age 85); Zagreb, Croatia
- Occupations: Jurist, politician

Ingrid Fickler (born October 27, 1940, in Zagreb) is a German jurist and politician, representative of the Christian Social Union of Bavaria.

She was a member of the Landtag of Bavaria between 1994 and 2008. From 1993 to 1995 she was a member of the party executive of the CSU.

== See also ==
- List of Bavarian Christian Social Union politicians
