= Klaus-Dieter Fritsche =

German politician

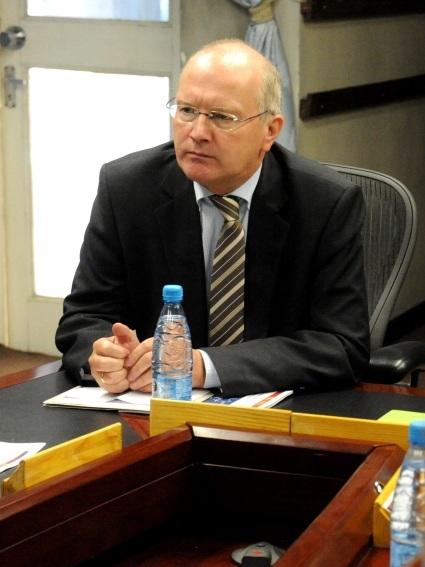
Klaus-Dieter Fritsche, 2010.

Klaus-Dieter Fritsche (born 16 May 1953 in Bamberg) is a former German civil servant who served as State Secretary and Commissioner for the Intelligence Services in the government of Chancellor Angela Merkel from 2014 until 2018. He is a member of the Christian Social Union of Bavaria (CSU).

== Early life and education ==
Fritsche studied law at the University of Erlangen.

== Career ==
Fritsche became a judge in 1981. From 1988 he worked for the CSU parliamentary group at the German Bundestag, then based in Bonn. In 1991 he joined the Bavarian representation in Bonn. He returned to Bavaria in 1993 as chief of staff to Hermann Regensburger and, from 1995, Günther Beckstein, at the Bavarian State Ministry of the Interior, in the government of Minister-President Edmund Stoiber.

From October 1996 Fritsche served as Vice President of the Federal Office for the Protection of the Constitution.

In Chancellor Merkel's first term, Fritsche served as Federal Intelligence Service coordinator at the German Chancellery from December 2005 on. In November 2009 he was appointed deputy minister (German: Staatssekretär) at the Federal Ministry of the Interior under the leadership of minister Thomas de Maizière, succeeding August Hanning.

== Later career ==
From 2019 until 2020, Fritsche worked as external advisor to Austrian Minister of the Interior Herbert Kickl in the government of Chancellor Sebastian Kurz.

Amid the Wirecard scandal, media reports revealed that Fritsche helped set up a meeting with Lars-Hendrik Röller, Merkel's senior economic adviser, and senior Wirecard executives in September 2019.

In 2020, Fritsche was appointed as member of German defense manufacturing company Heckler & Koch's supervisory board; however, the Chancellery later vetoed the appointment.

== See also ==
- List of Bavarian Christian Social Union politicians
