= Annemarie Biechl =

German politician (born 1949)

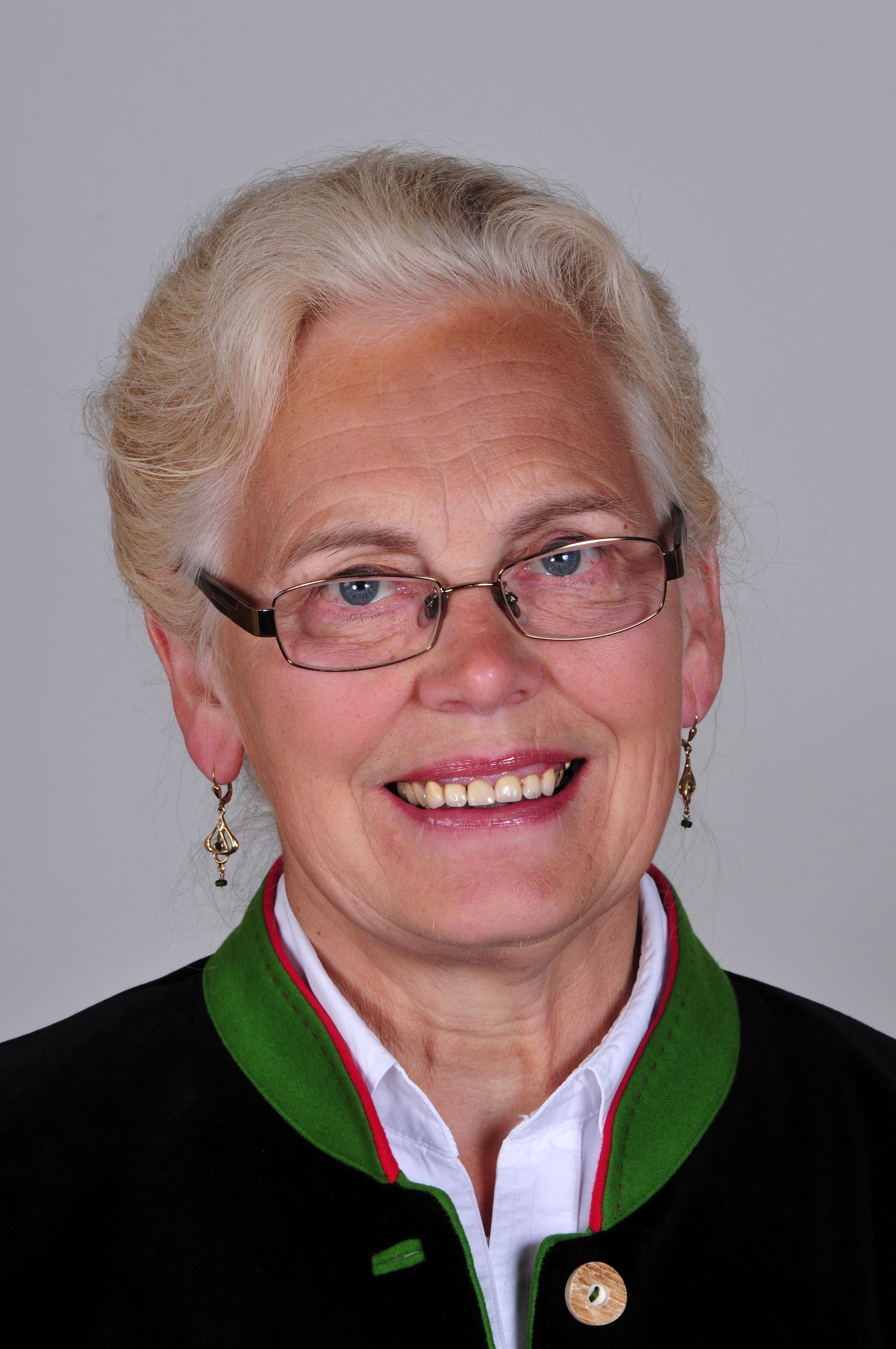
Annemarie Biechl in 2012

Annemarie Biechl (born February 6, 1949, in Gundelsberg, Bad Feilnbach) is a German politician, representative of the Christian Social Union of Bavaria. She is representative of the Landtag of Bavaria.

== See also ==
- List of Bavarian Christian Social Union politicians
