= Peter Deeg =

Peter Deeg (14 May 1908 – 25 June 2005) was a German lawyer, writer and politician. He was a member of the NSDAP and later the Christian Social Union of Bavaria.

== Early politics ==
Peter Deeg was born in Bad Kissingen. He was a NSDAP party-member since the year 1928. He became famous in connection with the so-called "Mordfall von Waltershausen" (Murder of Waltershausen), with a spectacular court hearing in 1933. This conflict has an antisemitic background. Because of the contact to important lawyers, he came in contact with Julius Streicher, who became his mentor.

== Nazism ==
Julius Streicher allowed Deeg to publish his books in the NSDAP publishing house Der Stürmer. Between 1938 and 1940, three famous books were published: Hofjuden (Court Jew), Die Judengesetze Großdeutschlands (Jewish laws of Großdeutschland), Vor 50 Jahren. Für und wider den Russen-Pakt (50 years ago – pro or against the pact with Russia). Since 1940, Deeg seemed to be in conflict with the NSDAP. But this part of his life is not very clear.

== After World War II ==
After World War II, Deeg became a close friend to Franz Josef Strauss. Together with him, he was a part of the Spiegel scandal.

== Works ==
- Qualifizierte Beihilfe in: „Goltdammer’s Archiv für Strafrecht“ (GoltdA) 1933.
- Inhalt und Ausübung des Strafantragsrechtes. Eine strafrechtliche Studie für Theorie und Praxis (Diss.) Stuttgart 1933.
- Der Judeneid unter Friedrich dem Großen in: „Zeitschrift der Akademie für deutsches Recht“ (ZAkDR) 1937.
- Hofjuden. Juden, Judenverbrechen und Judengesetze in Deutschland von der Vergangenheit bis zur Gegenwart (Hrsg. v. Julius Streicher) Nürnberg 1938. Internet Archive
- Die Judenpolitik Friedrichs des Großen in: „Deutsches Recht“ (DR 1, 2) 1938.
- Die Judengesetze Großdeutschlands (Hrsg. v. Julius Streicher) Nürnberg 1939.
- Vor 50 Jahren. Für und wider den Russen-Pakt Nürnberg 1940.
- Die Glanzvolle Leipzig 1942.
- together with Dietrich Deeg Zur Genealogie und Lebensgeschichte der Äbte Degen von Ebrach und Weiner von Banz Neustadt an der Aisch 1974.

== See also ==
- List of Bavarian Christian Social Union politicians
