= Maria Deku =

German politician

Maria Deku (18 March 1901 in Düsseldorf – 19 April 1983 in Kleinblittersdorf) was a German politician, representative of the Christian Social Union of Bavaria.

Between December 1946 and February 1948 she was a member of the Landtag of Bavaria.

== See also ==
- List of Bavarian Christian Social Union politicians
