= Klaus Dieter Breitschwert =

German politician

Klaus Dieter Breitschwert (born 21 April 1943) is a German politician, representative of the Christian Social Union of Bavaria.

He represents Ansbach in the Landtag of Bavaria.

== See also ==
- List of Bavarian Christian Social Union politicians
