= Georg Barfuß =

German politician

Georg Barfuß (born 10 June 1944) is a German politician, a representative of the FDP.

He was educated in lauingen elementary school 1950-57 then 1957-60 Donauwörth private school before going to Donauwörth vocational school 1960-62.

He served as mayor of lauingen, where he commissioned the Hicret Mosque, earning him the nickname "Türkenschorsch".

He was a member of the Landtag of Bavaria. He served as a member of the CSU for 24 years before joining the FDP for 4 years.

He is married with five children.

== See also ==
- List of Bavarian Christian Social Union politicians
