= Max Fischer (politician) =

German politician

Max Fischer (6 May 1927 – 11 July 2015) was a German politician and a representative of the Christian Social Union of Bavaria.

== See also ==
- List of Bavarian Christian Social Union politicians
