= Renate Dodell =

German politician

Renate Dodell (born 7 November 1952 in Seeshaupt) is a German politician, representative of the Christian Social Union of Bavaria.

== Education and previous professions ==
Renate Dodell majored in economics and geography for teaching in secondary schools at LMU Munich. In 1977, she passed the second state examination. After three years of working as a teacher and a family break until 1987, she worked self-employed as an accountant until 1994.

Renate Dodell is Roman Catholic, divorced and mother of three children.

== Political positions ==
She is a member of the Landtag of Bavaria and vice-chairman of the parliamentary group for the Christian Social Union of Bavaria.

== Honours and distinction ==
On 14 July 2005, Renate Dodell was honoured with the Bavarian Order of Merit.

== See also ==
- List of Bavarian Christian Social Union politicians
