= Elisabeth Bauriedel =

German politician (born 1939)

Elisabeth Bauriedel (born 20 June 1939) was a German politician, representative of the Christian Social Union in Bavaria.

== See also ==
- List of Bavarian Christian Social Union politicians
