= Gerhard Bletschacher =

German politician (born 1930)

Gerhard Bletschacher (born 25 December 1930) is a German politician, who was a representative of the Christian Social Union of Bavaria.

Bletschacher was elected as head of the council of Munich in 1984.

== See also ==
- List of Bavarian Christian Social Union politicians
