= Otmar Bernhard =

German politician

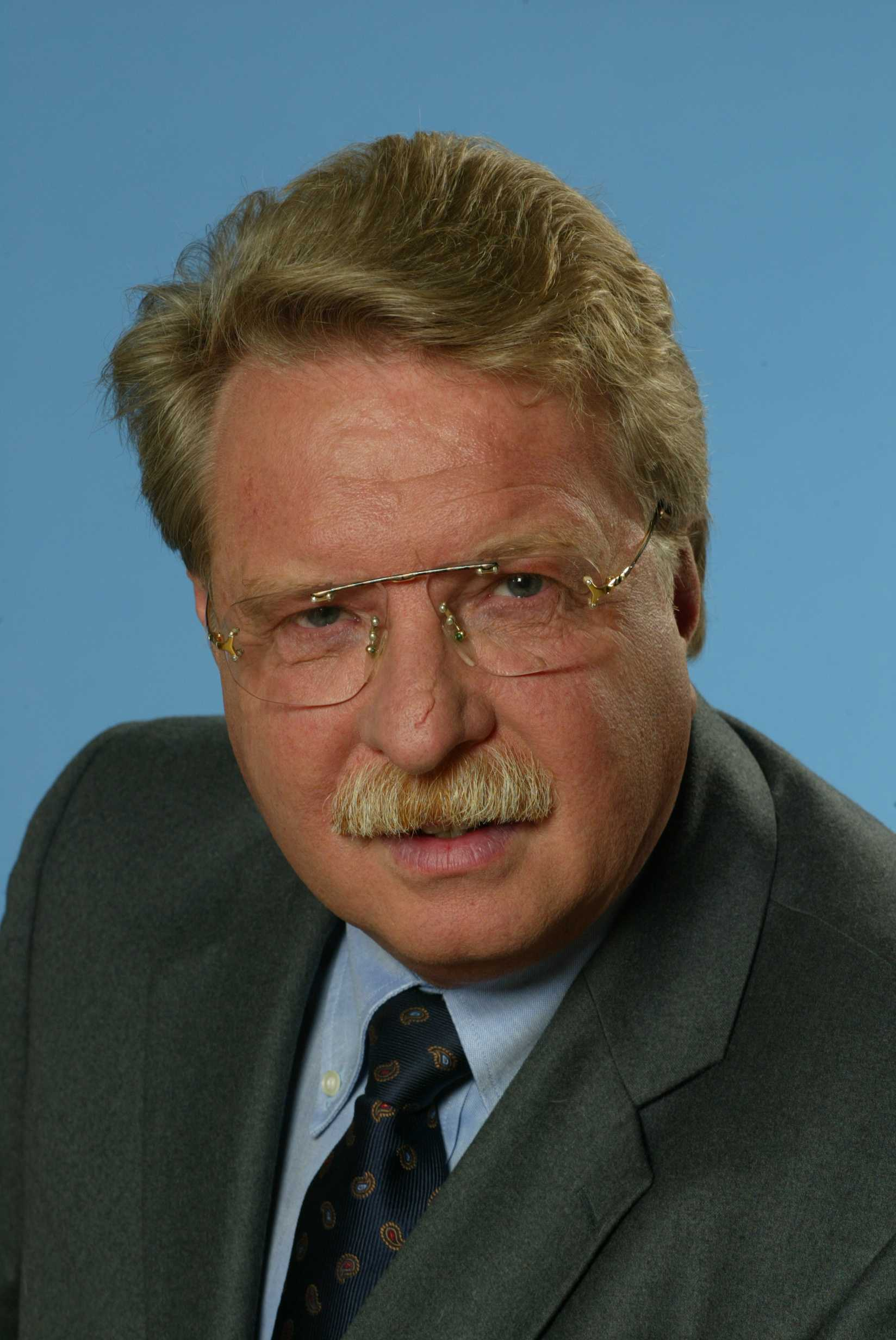
Otmar Bernhard.

Otmar Bernhard (born October 6, 1946 in Munich) is a German politician, representative of the Christian Social Union of Bavaria. He is a member of the Bavarian Landtag. From 2005 to 2007 he was Secretary of Health and from 2007 to 2008 was Bavarian State Minister for the Environment.

== See also ==
- List of Bavarian Christian Social Union politicians
- http://www.otmar-bernhard.de
