= Max Frauendorfer =

German jurist and politician

Max Frauendorfer (June 14, 1909 – July 25, 1989) was a German jurist and politician, representative of the NSDAP and the Christian Social Union of Bavaria.

== Early years ==
Frauendorfer, the son of a lawyer, completed his school career at the humanistic Ludwigsgymnasium in Munich in 1928 with the Abitur. He then studied economics, newspaper studies and law at the universities of Munich, Berlin and Erlangen, graduating in October 1931. He then worked as a legal trainee at the Munich District Court. At the beginning of 1933 he received his doctorate in law with his dissertation "Self-defense against Law Enforcement Officers".

== The National Socialist era ==
Frauendorfer joined the NSDAP on May 1, 1928 (membership number 85,562) and the SS in the same year (SS number 1,281). At the same time, he became a member of the National Socialist German Student Association (NSDStB). As early as 1929, he was active on an honorary basis in the economic policy department of the Reich leadership of the NSDAP. Frauendorfer was managing director under the head of the intelligence department Karl Leon Du Moulin-Eckart in the Supreme SA Leadership (OSAF) in the early 1930s.

He also served as a gauder in Munich and volunteered as editor at the Illustrierter Beobachter. Heinrich Himmler, who became aware of Frauendorfer, took the young officer into the staff Reichsführer SS z. b. V. in the spring of 1932, where he was assigned until the mid-1930s. Finally, from mid-March 1933 to mid-May 1933, Frauendorfer was adjutant to Munich Police President Heinrich Himmler.

In the NSDAP, he became a department head for domestic policy ("Referat Ständischer Aufbau") in the Reichsleitung in November 1931 and headed the Office for Estates Development of the German Labor Front (DAF) from June 1933. In the DAF, he was also deputy head of the Organization Office from May 1934 and head of the Training Office from the end of 1934.

In September 1934, at the instigation of Robert Ley, Frauendorfer, now head of the office, also succeeded Otto Gohdes as Reich training director in the Rosenberg office. In the Training Office, Frauendorfer's duties included:

- Training of political leaders
- Responsibility for the party schools
- Publication of the "Schulungsbriefe" of the DAF and NSDAP

His superior, the party ideologist Alfred Rosenberg, first learned of the personnel change in the Training Office from the newspaper. Frauendorfer himself was later told by Ley that the reason for Gohde's replacement was his attachment to Rosenberg.

== Literature ==
- Thomas Schlemmer: Grenzen der Integration. Die CSU und der Umgang mit der nationalsozialistischen Vergangenheit – Der Fall Dr. Max Frauendorfer. In: Institut für Zeitgeschichte München (Hrsg.): Vierteljahrshefte für Zeitgeschichte, 48. Jahrgang, Heft 4 / 2000, ISSN 0042-5702.
- Erich Stockhorst: 5000 Köpfe - Wer war was im Dritten Reich. Arndt, Kiel 2000, ISBN 3-88741-116-1.
- Ernst Klee: Das Personenlexikon zum Dritten Reich. Fischer Verlag, Frankfurt am Main 2007, ISBN 978-3-596-16048-8. (Aktualisierte 2. Auflage)
- Reinhard Bollmus: Das Amt Rosenberg und seine Gegner. Studien zum Machtkampf im nationalsozialistischen Herrschaftssystem. Stuttgart 1970. (2. Auflage, Oldenbourg, München 2006, ISBN 3-486-54501-9.)

== See also ==
- List of Bavarian Christian Social Union politicians
