= Otto Frommknecht =

German politician

Otto Frommknecht (17 November 1881–16 August 1969) was a German politician. He was a representative of the Christian Social Union of Bavaria and from 1919 to 1933 was a member of the Bavarian People's Party.

== Life ==
Frommknecht was born 17 November 1881 in Grünenbach, Germany. From 1901 to 1905 he studied civil engineering at the Technical University of Munich and entered public service in 1909 with the Bavarian State Railway as a civil engineering specialist. He served in the First World War and, from 1919 to 1924, held the position of Mayor of Obermenzing. He served as chairman of the Bavarian People's Party (BVP) in the same district, of which he had been a member since 1919 and later as a municipal councillor in Obermenzing. During the early 1920s, he also held the role of State Director of the Technical Emergency Aid Bavaria.

Frommknecht's professional life was severely affected after 1933 due to the political climate under the Nazi party and he left the BVP. In 1938, he was arrested and sentenced a year later by the People's Court to a year in prison for anti-Nazi activities, after which he was dismissed from public service. Following his release in 1940, he initially faced unemployment but later worked for Brown & Boveri during the Second World War. In July 1945, he returned to public service in the Reichsbahn as a department head in the Directorate in Munich and was later retroactively promoted to department president as a form of restitution. Around 1946 he joined the Christian Social Union (CSU), becoming a member of its State Executive Committee in 1947 until 1950. He was State Minister for Transport Affairs from January 1947 to December 1950, and briefly served as a member of the Bizone Transport Board in 1947.

He died on 16 August 1969 in Pipping, Munich.

== See also ==
- List of Bavarian Christian Social Union politicians
