= Manfred Christ =

German politician

- Born: 18 February 1940; Aschaffenburg, Germany
- Died: 24 December 2020 (aged 80); Aschaffenburg, Germany
- Occupation: politician

Manfred Christ (18 February 1940 – 24 December 2020) was a German politician, representing the Christian Social Union of Bavaria.

Between 1990 and 2008 he represented the constituency of Aschaffenburg-West in the Landtag of Bavaria.

After leaving school in 1958, Christ trained first as a machine fitter, then in industrial sales, eventually becoming a company secretary in 1969. He was self-employed between 1983 and his election to the Landtag of Bavaria in 1990. Manfred Christ married in 1964, and has three children and four grandchildren.

Christ joined the CSU in 1958 and was a member of the Young Union from 1958 to 1976, also serving on its local executive committees. He became a member of Aschaffenburg's City Council in 1972 and from 1974 to 2003 Christ was the CSU Chair for Aschenaffenburg Mitte. From 1979 he was the Deputy Leader of the CSU group on the City council and was Press Spokesman from 1979 to 1990.

From 1990 he represented the constituency of Unterfranken (later Aschaffenburg West) in the Landtag of Bavaria, serving on the Committee for Commerce and Transport. Until 2003 he was also a member of the Petitions Committee, then, from 2003 onwards, the State Monument Council. He did not stand for re-election in 2008.

== See also ==
- List of Bavarian Christian Social Union politicians
