= Luitpold Braun =

German politician

Luitpold Braun (born August 11, 1950) is a German politician, representative of the Christian Social Union of Bavaria. From 1996 to 2008 he was chairman of the Weilheim-Schongau. In the CSU, he was chairman of the Association of Municipal Affairs and member of the party executive.

== See also ==
- List of Bavarian Christian Social Union politicians
