= Leonhard Deininger =

German politician

Leonhard Deininger (11 November 1910 - 17 September 2002) was a German politician, representative of the Christian Social Union of Bavaria.

From 1958-1970 he was a deputy in the Landtag of Bavaria for the constituency of Regensburg-Land, a member of the Bavarian Senate (1972-1977) as well as County Commissioner in the district of Regensburg (1948-1978).

== See also ==
- List of Bavarian Christian Social Union politicians
