= Rupert Berger =

German politician

Rupert Berger (February 10, 1896 - February 9, 1958) was a German politician, representative of the Christian Social Union of Bavaria. In 1946, he was elected to represent the Landtag of Bavaria.

Rupert Berger attended the secondary school in Traunstein and was a founding member of the Bavarian People's Party. During the First World War he was a soldier in the Imperial Navy. He was head of the Bayernwacht in the Chiemgau and was briefly interned in the Dachau concentration camp in 1933 and then released without notice. After his release, Berger worked as an innkeeper in Regensburg and Landshut. During the Second World War he was again a soldier in the Navy. After the war he was a founding member of the CSU.

== See also ==
- List of Bavarian Christian Social Union politicians
