= Leonhard Baumeister =

German politician (1904–1972)

Leonhard Baumeister (25 October 1904 – 19 August 1972) was a German politician. He was a representative of the Christian Social Union of Bavaria and a member of the Landtag of Bavaria from 1946 to 1954.

His name was added to the Monument to the X-ray and Radium Martyrs of All Nations in Hamburg, Germany.

== See also ==
- List of Bavarian Christian Social Union politicians
