= Gudrun Brendel-Fischer =

German politician

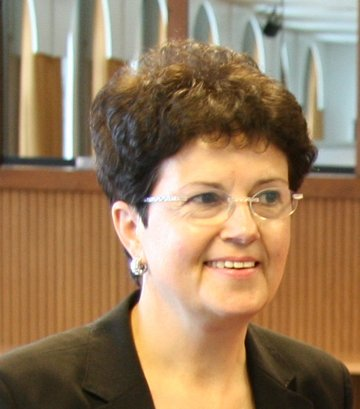
- Born: 17 June 1959; Bayreuth, Germany
- Occupation: Politician

Gudrun Brendel-Fischer (born 17 June 1959 in Bayreuth, Germany) is a German politician, representative of the Christian Social Union of Bavaria. She is a representative of the district of Bayreuth in the Bavarian State Parliament.

== Life and Family ==
After completing secondary education at the Richard Wagner Gymnasium in 1975, Brendel-Fischer trained as a specialist teacher for nutrition and design. In 1983, she started teaching in the districts of Kulmbach, Kronach and Bayreuth. From 1985 to 2007, she was a teacher seminar leader. Since April 2011 she heads the District Association for Horticulture and Landscape Conservation in Upper Franconia (Oberfranken).

Brendel-Fischer is a Protestant. She is married and has two daughters. She lives on a farm in Heinersreuth-Tannenbach in Bavaria, which is managed by her husband.

== Politics ==
Brendel-Fischer began her political career by joining the Young Union of Germany (Junge Union Deutschlands), the joint youth organisation of the CDU and CSU in 1974. She was also active in the German Rural Youth and the Federal Youth Ring. She has been a member of the CSU and the Women's Union since 1985.

She was a member of the town council of her hometown of Heinersreuth from 1990 to 2008. She has been a district councilor in the Bayreuth district since 2008. In May 2015, she succeeded Hartmut Koschyk as chairwoman of the CSU district association Bayreuth-Land. In January 2007, she succeeded Henry Schramm in the Bavarian State Parliament. There she is a member of the Committee for Family and Social Affairs and the Committee for Food, Agriculture and Forestry. On 14 January 2009, in Wildbad Kreuth, Brendel-Fischer was elected as the new chairwoman of the women's working group of the CSU parliamentary group in the Bavarian state parliament, succeeding Ursula Männle.

In the 2013 Bavarian state election, she was directly elected to the state parliament in the Bayreuth constituency with 42.68 percent of the first-place votes. She has been deputy leader of the CSU parliamentary group in the state parliament since the 17th legislative period. Brendel-Fischer is also a member of the Education and Culture Committee.

On 21 March 2018 she was appointed honorary commissioner of the Bavarian state government, and on 27 November 2018 she was appointed acting integration commissioner by the Council of Ministers.

== See also ==
- List of Bavarian Christian Social Union politicians
