= Günther Babel =

German politician

Günther Babel (born 26 September 1952 in Wassertrüdingen) is a German politician, representative of the Christian Social Union of Bavaria. Between 2003 and 2008 he was a member of the Landtag of Bavaria. In March 2008, Babel was elected mayor of the town Wassertrüdingen.

== Early career ==
After elementary and vocational school, he completed an agricultural apprenticeship and later a technician and master craftsman training. From 1974 to 1988, Babel worked as a technical teacher and from 1988 as deputy headmaster at the agricultural machinery school in Triesdorf.

== Political career ==
In 1972 he joined the CSU and became a member of the Wassertrüdingen city council in 1990. Since 1995, Babel has been the CSU local chairman in Wassertrüdingen and a member of the CSU district board in the Ansbach district. After being elected to the Ansbach district council in 1996 and being elected second mayor of Wassertrüdingen in 2002, he was elected to the Bavarian state parliament in 2003. There, Babel was a member of the Committee for Health, Environment and Consumer Protection.

From 2008 to 2018, Günther Babel was the first mayor of the city of Wassertrüdingen.

== See also ==
- List of Bavarian Christian Social Union politicians
