= Martin Bachhuber =

German politician

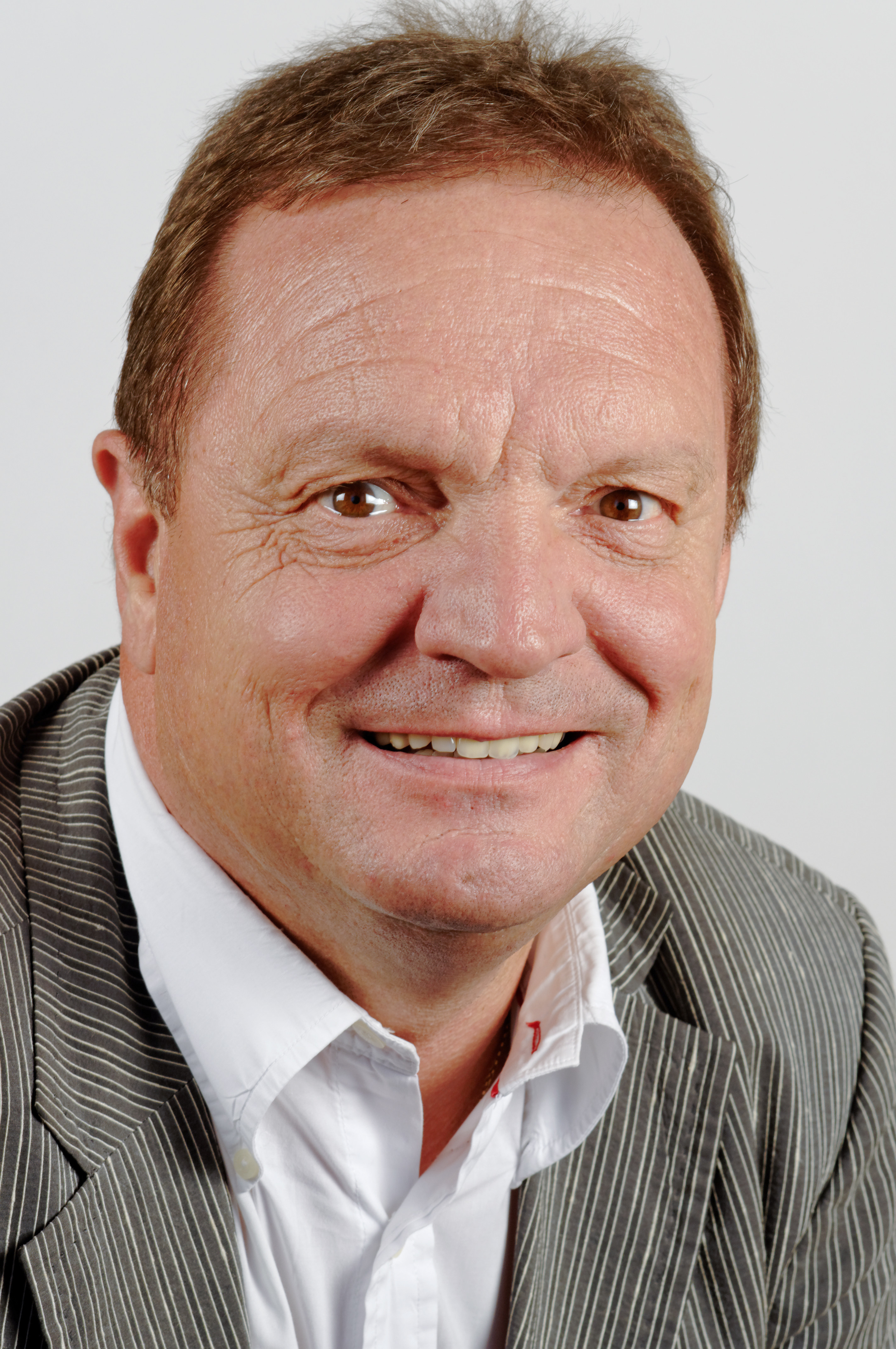
Bachhuber in 2012.

Martin Bachhuber (born October 14, 1955, in Benediktbeuern) is a German politician, representative of the Christian Social Union of Bavaria. From 1984 to 2008 he was the mayor of Bad Heilbrunn. Since 2008 he is a member of the Bavarian Landtag.

== See also ==
- List of Bavarian Christian Social Union politicians
