= Stefan Bosse =

German politician

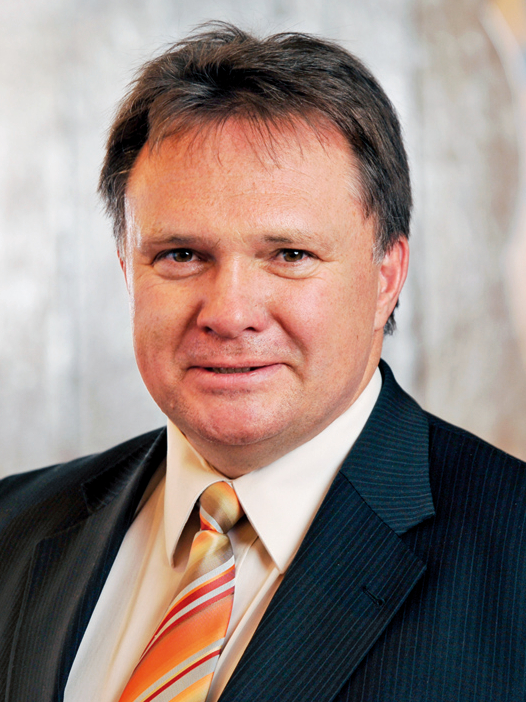
Bosse

Stefan Bosse (born 24 December 1964) is a German politician, representative of the Christian Social Union of Bavaria (CSU).

Since 2004 he has been an Oberbürgermeister for the state of Kaufbeuren.

== See also ==
- List of Bavarian Christian Social Union politicians
