= Gerhard Eck =

German politician

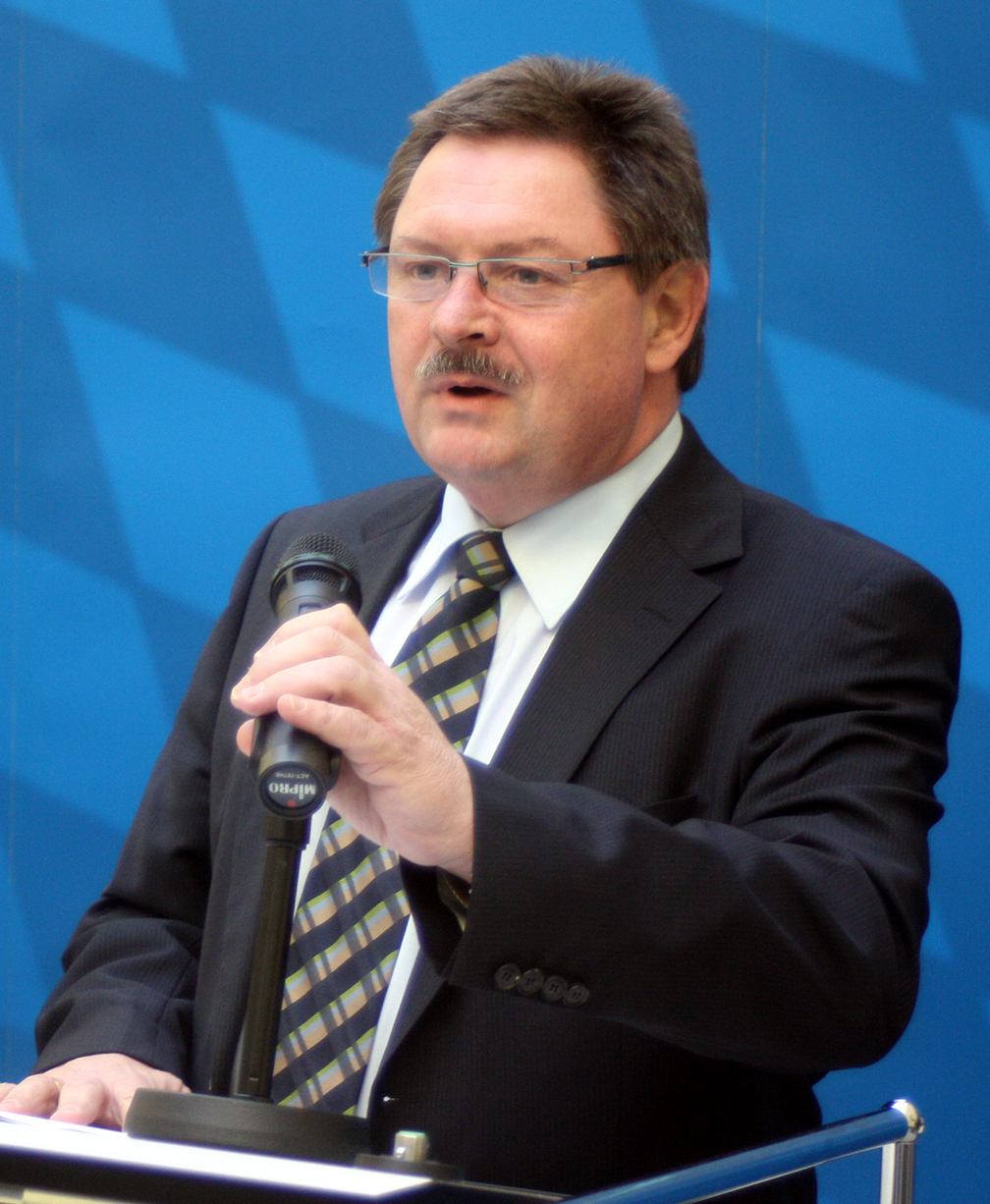
Eck in 2011

Gerhard Eck (born 24 January 1960 in Schweinfurt) is a German politician, representative of the Christian Social Union of Bavaria (CSU).

== Political career ==
Eck is a member of the Landtag of Bavaria. Since 2013, he has been State Secretary at the State Ministry of the Interior in the governments of successive Ministers-President Horst Seehofer (2013-2018) and Markus Söder (since 2018). He is one of his state's representatives at the Bundesrat.

== Other activities ==
- Federal Network Agency for Electricity, Gas, Telecommunications, Post and Railway (BNetzA), Member of the Rail Infrastructure Advisory Council
- Nuremberg Airport, Ex-Officio Member of the Supervisory Board (since 2017)
- BayernLB, Member of the Supervisory Board (-2013)

== See also ==
- List of Bavarian Christian Social Union politicians
