= Walter Eykmann =

German politician (born 1937)

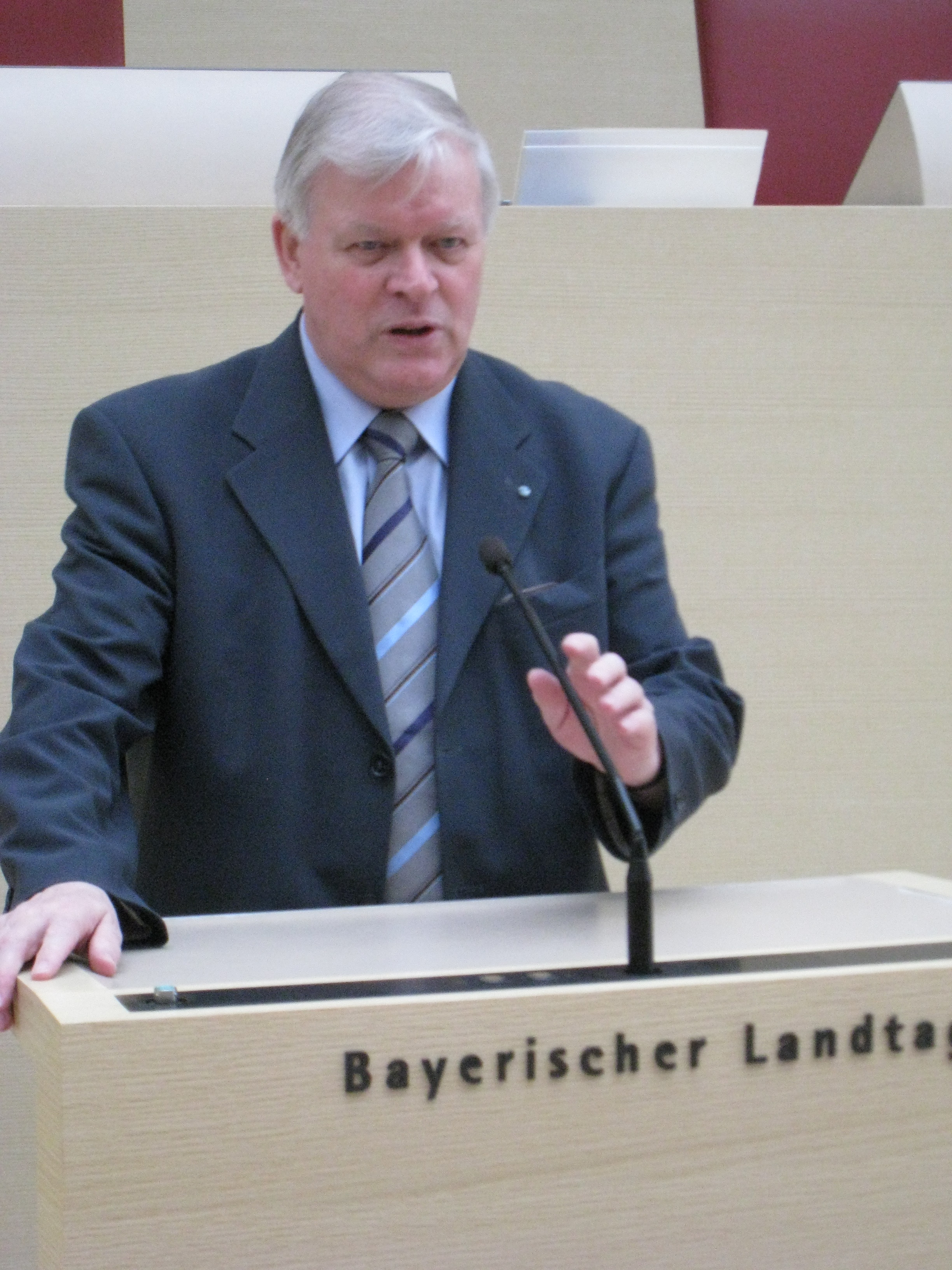
Walter Eykmann

Walter Eykmann (born August 20, 1937) is a German politician, representative of the Christian Social Union of Bavaria. He was a member of the Landtag of Bavaria from the 1970s.

== See also ==
- List of Bavarian Christian Social Union politicians
