= Franz Josef Delonge =

German lawyer and politician

Franz Josef Delonge (24 June 1927 – 10 June 1988) was a German lawyer and politician, representative of the Christian Social Union of Bavaria.

Since 1968 he belonged to the Munich city council, and from 1978 to 1984 was Chairman of the CSU in Munich. He did much work with mayor Erich Kiesl (CSU) in building and planning law, the modernization of municipal administration and the promotion of sport.

== See also ==
- List of Bavarian Christian Social Union politicians
