= Klaus P. Arnold =

German lawyer and local politician (born 1944)

Klaus P. Arnold (born 1944) is a German lawyer and local politician. He is a representative of the Christian Social Union of Bavaria. Since 1991 he has been chairman of the Board of Trustees of the Cultural Foundation.

Arnold studied from 1963 to 1968 at Ludwig-Maximilians-Universität München (LMU Munich) in his birth city of Munich. After his clerkship, he went to the University of Zurich and received his doctorate. Subsequently, he was from 1972 to 1974 an accountant in various industries and mid-sized companies. In 1975, he settled in Munich as a lawyer, specializing in civil and commercial law.

In addition to his professional activity, he became politically and socially involved. From 1971 to 1979 he was a member of the Land Executive of the Young Union. In 1972, he took over the municipal council of his hometown Gauting. From 1987 to 1996 he was Deputy Governor of the district of Starnberg.

Four years after its founding in 1976 he took over the chairmanship of the German Children's Fund, which he retained until 1980. Since 1985 he has been President of the Fondazione Rotonda Romana. In 1991, he took over the chairmanship of the Cultural Foundation Board of Trustees, the annual German Culture Prize awards. Since 1992 he is also chairman of the Vera and Volker-Doppelfeld foundations for science, culture and education.

== See also ==
- List of Bavarian Christian Social Union politicians
