= Mathilde Berghofer-Weichner =

German politician

Mathilde Berghofer-Weichner (23 January 1931, in Munich – 29 May 2008, in Munich) was a German politician, representative of the Christian Social Union of Bavaria. She studied legal science in Munich. She was elected to the Landtag of Bavaria between 1970 and 1994.

== See also ==
- List of Bavarian Christian Social Union politicians
