= Richard Bartsch =

German politician

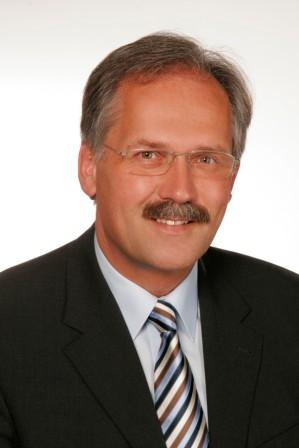

Richard Bartsch (born August 1, 1959) is a German politician, representative of the Christian Social Union of Bavaria.

Bartsch is noted for his work with geriatrics institutions. In 1990 founded the geriatrics Bartsch-Förderverein Mittelfranken eV and was chairman until 2003. In 1993 he was a founding member and chairman of the Bavarian Geriatric Association.

== See also ==
- List of Bavarian Christian Social Union politicians
