= Rudolf Eberhard =

German politician (1914–1998)

Rudolf Eberhard (November 1, 1914 Nuremberg – December 26, 1998 Munich) was a German politician, representative of the Christian Social Union of Bavaria. He was a member of the Landtag of Bavaria between 1950 and 1974.

== Honours and awards ==
- Honorary Doctor of Medicine, University of Erlangen-Nuremberg
- Bavarian Order of Merit (1959)
- Grand Decoration of Honour in Silver with Sash for Services to the Republic of Austria (1959)
- Medal for Combating Deadly Seriousness (1960)
- Grand Merit Cross with Star and Sash

== See also ==
- List of Bavarian Christian Social Union politicians
