= Manfred Ach =

German politician (1940–2024)

Manfred Ach (14 September 1940 – 15 June 2024) was a German politician, representative of the Christian Social Union of Bavaria (CSU). He was a member of the Landtag of Bavaria between 1994 and 2008.

== Career ==
Manfred Ach was born in Ansbach. After passing the Mittlere Reife, Manfred Ach took a traineeship from 1957 to 1961 for the higher non-technical administrative service at the social security office of Würzburg. From 1962 to 1966 he worked at the social security office of Nürnberg. Then from 1966 to 1970 he was employed at the social security authority of Bavaria in Munich, before transferring in 1970 to the government auditing office in Würzburg. From 1991 to 1994 he was the head of this authority, now as an Oberregierungsrat (a senior civil service rank in Germany) in the senior administrative service (since 1989).

From May 1962, Ach was a member of the CSU. Later he was elected the deputy chairman of the local CSU association for the district Würzburg-Land. From 1978 to 1999 he was a member of the municipal and the district councils, and after 1990 was chairman of the CSU group in the district council.

During his time in the Bavarian Landtag, Ach was a member of the committee for budget and finance matters after 1994, and was its committee chairman from 1998 to 2008. He was also a member of the committee for social, health and family policy from 1994 to 1998. He was a member of the CSU parliamentary leadership. For the Bavarian Landtag elections in 2008, he was no longer a candidate.

From 2003 to 2009, Ach was President of the Nordbayerische Musikbund (North Bavarian Music Association).

== Personal life and death ==
Manfred Achs was Catholic, and was married with two daughters. He lived in Margetshöchheim. He died on 15 June 2024, at the age of 83.

== See also ==
- List of Bavarian Christian Social Union politicians
