= Johann Anetseder =

German politician (1898–1948)

Johann Anetseder (7 October 1898 - 12 December 1948) was a German politician, representative of the Christian Social Union of Bavaria. He was a member of the Landtag of Bavaria from December 1946 - December 1948. He was born in Aichet (Thyrnau) and died in Kellberg near Thyrnau.

== See also ==
- List of Bavarian Christian Social Union politicians
