= Demel (surname) =

Demel (feminine: Demelová) is a Czech surname. It came to the Czech language as a derivation from the German surnames Temml and Themml, or from the old German given names Dagomar, Thiemo, Thomas, etc. A similar surname with the same etymology is Deml. Notable people with the surname include:

- Guy Demel (born 1981), Ivorian footballer
- Patrik Demel (born 1995), Czech ice hockey player
- Paul Demel (1903–1951), Czech actor
- Sam Demel (born 1985), American baseball player
- Tomáš Demel (born 1978), Czech ice hockey coach
- Walter Demel (1935–2023), German cross-country skier
