= Adolf Fetsch =

Ukrainian-German politician (born 1940)

Adolf Fetsch (born 1940 in Ukraine) is a Ukrainian-German politician, representative of the Christian Social Union of Bavaria.

He has been a Russian-German integration activist since 2003 and is chairman of the Federal Land team of Germans from Russia.

== See also ==
- List of Christian Social Union of Bavaria politicians
