= Günther Denzler =

German politician (born 1948)

Günther Denzler (born 26 February 1948 in Bamberg) is a German politician, representative of the Christian Social Union in Bavaria. He represents Bamberg (district).

== See also ==
- List of Christian Social Union of Bavaria politicians
