= Walburga Fricke =

German politician

Member of the Bundestag
- In office 5 May 2008 – 28 September 2008

Personal details
- Occupation: Politicians

Walburga Fricke (14 September 1936 – 24 September 2019) was a German politician, representative of the Christian Social Union of Bavaria. She is a member of the Landtag of Bavaria.

== See also ==
- List of Bavarian Christian Social Union politicians
