= Rudolf Engelhard =

German politician (born 1950)

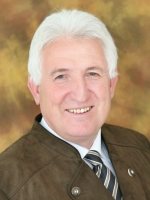
Rudolf Engelhard

Rudolf Engelhard (born 10 March 1950) is a German politician, representative of the Christian Social Union of Bavaria. Between 1986 and 1996 he was a member of the Landtag of Bavaria.

== See also ==
- List of Christian Social Union of Bavaria politicians
