= Erwin Ammann =

German politician

Erwin Ammann (22 October 1916 – 27 December 2000) was a German politician and member of the Christian Social Union of Bavaria. Between 1946 and 1950 he was a member of the Landtag of Bavaria.

== Life ==
Ammann was born in Würzburg. He studied at Nuremberg's school of technical engineering, specialising in telegraph construction and telecommunications. He was a youth leader for the Bündische Jugend (a German Scouting organization) and was arrested for political reasons. In 1935, he undertook the youth group's first trips abroad, firstly to Austria, and subsequently Italy in 1937. His career often suffered due to desire not to join the National Socialist Party because of which he terminated his contract at the Reichspost to complete his secondary school education at a private school. He consequently continued his studies at a state technical institute in Nuremberg. He was drafted into the Wehrmacht in 1941 and served as a soldier fighting in the war until 1945. After returning to civilian life, he became one of the CSU's co-founders in Lower Franconia. He died in Würzburg.

== Political career ==
In 1946 Ammann become a member of Würzburg's town council, as well as the youngest member of the CSU's parliamentary group in Bavaria. From 1947, he was the executive for the district of Ochsenfurt. In the 1946 elections for the first Bavarian Landtag, he won a seat in the district Upper Franconia, whose electoral district he had previously become a member of. Ammann was a member of the Committee on Questions of Civil Service Law and the Salary and the Committee on Legal and Constitutional Issues. He was also a member of the subcommittee of the Constitutional Committee for electoral districts.

== See also ==
- List of Bavarian Christian Social Union politicians
