= Wolfgang Dandorfer =

German politician (1949–2023)

Wolfgang Dandorfer (5 June 1949 – 29 July 2023) was a German politician who was a member of the Christian Social Union in Bavaria (CSU).

== Biography ==
Wolfgang Dandorfer was born in Vilseck on 5 June 1949.

He was mayor of Amberg from 1990 until leaving office in April 2014. He was also a member of the Landtag of Bavaria between 1982 and 1990.

Dandorfer died of a heart attack on 29 July 2023, at the age of 74.

== See also ==
- List of Bavarian Christian Social Union politicians
