= Karl Döhler =

German politician

Karl Döhler (born April 4, 1956) is a German politician, representative of the Christian Social Union of Bavaria. He is a representative of Wunsiedel District in the Landtag of Bavaria.

== Education and profession ==
Karl Döhler completed military service in Regensburg, and then studied biology in Erlangen. After studying as a research assistant at the Universities of Karlsruhe and Bayreuth in the years 1982 to 1988, he was head of the security and environmental protection department of the GBFmbH in Braunschweig from 1989 to 1991. From 1991 to 1995 he worked in the Bavarian Ministry of Health, Food and Consumer Protection, as well as on land development and environmental issues.

== Politics ==
Karl Döhler is a member of the CSU. Since 2002, he has been a district councilor and deputy of the district council in the district of Wunsiedel in the Fichtelgebirge. From 6 October 2003 to 30 April 2008 he was a member of the Landtag.

On March 2, 2008, Karl Döhler became a district administrator in the district of Wunsiedel in the Fichtelgebirge. For the first time since its foundation after the Second World War, the CSU has placed the district councilor in Wunsiedel. In the municipal elections in Bavaria in 2014 he was reelected with 59 per cent as district administrator while the SPD candidate Jörg Nürnberger had 41 percent.

== See also ==
- List of Bavarian Christian Social Union politicians
