= Herbert Ettengruber =

German politician (born 1941)

Herbert Ettengruber (born 19 July 1941) is a German politician, representative of the Christian Social Union of Bavaria. Between 1996 and 2008 he was a member of the Landtag of Bavaria.

== See also ==
- List of Bavarian Christian Social Union politicians
