= Gabriele Pauli =

German politician

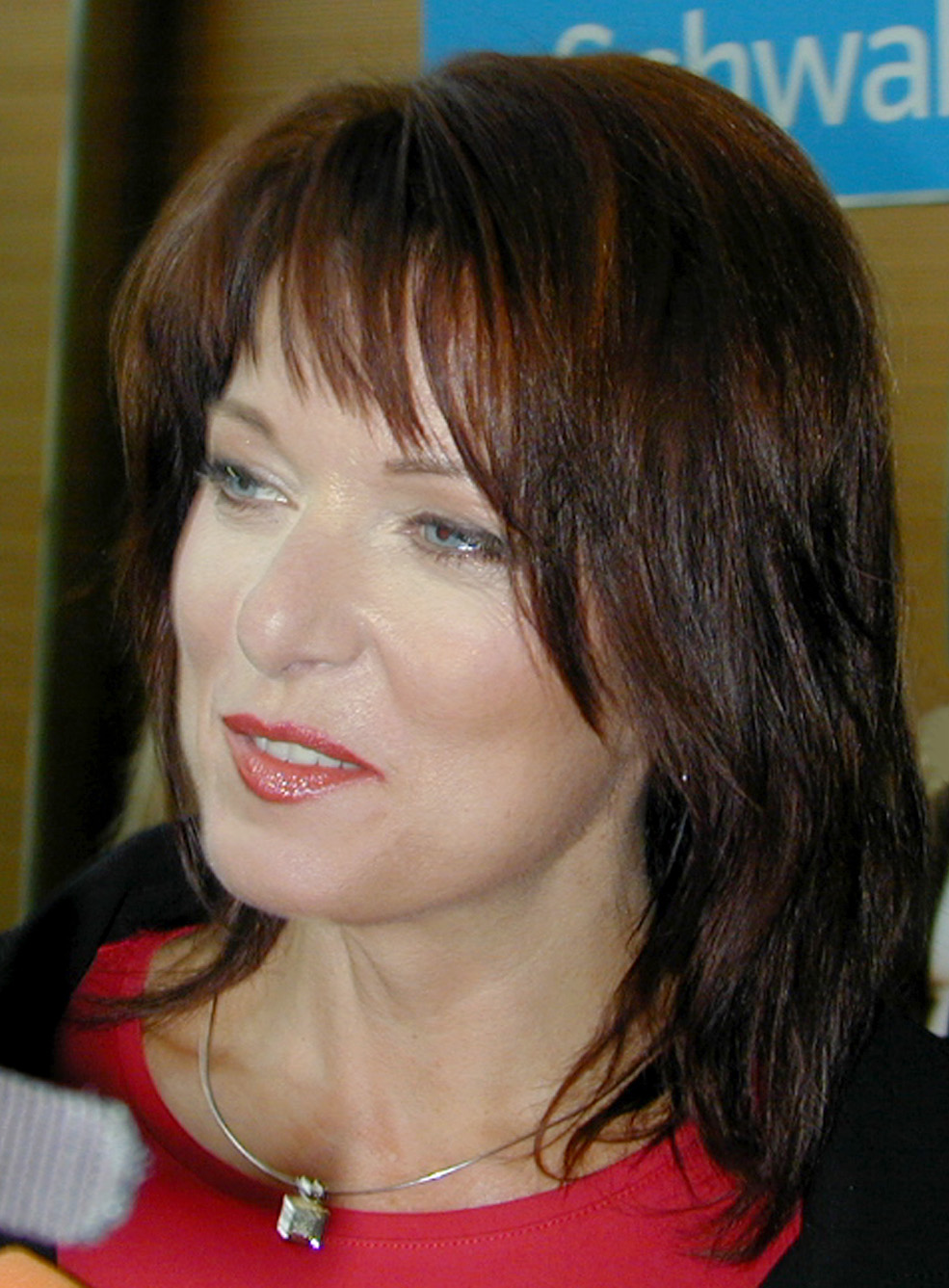

Leader of the Freie Union Party
- In office 21 June 2009 – 27 May 2010
- Preceded by: Position established
- Succeeded by: Helga M. Hummel

Member of the Landtag of Bavaria
- In office 28 September 2008 – 15 September 2013

District administrator of Fürth
- In office 1 May 1990 – 2 March 2008
- Preceded by: Dietrich Sommerschuh
- Succeeded by: Matthias Dießl

Personal details
- Born: 26 June 1957 (age 69) Schweich, Germany
- Party: CSU (1977–2007); Freie Wähler (2008–2009); Freie Union (2009–2010); Independent (since 2010)

Gabriele Pauli (born 26 June 1957) is a German politician, formerly with the conservative Christian Social Union (CSU) party. She was the District Administrator for the rural district of Fürth from 1990 to 2008.

== Career ==
In 2006 and 2007, Pauli's open criticism of Edmund Stoiber, fellow CSU member and minister-president of the German state of Bavaria, led to a crisis in the party which ultimately resulted in Stoiber's resignation.

On 21 September 2007, Pauli shocked the Catholic German state by suggesting marriage should expire after seven years, at which time couples could extend or dissolve the marriage.

She lost a run for the leadership of Bavaria's CSU party in an election won by Erwin Huber by a large margin. Pauli herself received only 2.5% of the votes.

Pauli left the CSU on 21 November 2007. In June 2008, she joined the Freie Wähler Bayern (Independent Voters Association of Bavaria). She was one of the party's candidates for the parliament of the state of Bavaria (Landtag of Bavaria) in September 2008. Although Pauli was listed as candidate number 8 in Middle Franconia, she was ranked first by the region's voters (Bavaria has an open-list system), making her one of the two Independent Voters Association candidates elected from Middle Franconia. She then ran for the European Parliament in June 2009, but her party got only 1.7% of the votes across Germany.

Pauli finished her political career in 2016.
