= Hans Amler =

German politician

- Born: 5 November 1933
- Died: 7 December 2022 (aged 89)
- Occupation: Politician
- Political party: Christian Social Union of Bavaria

Hans Amler (5 November 1933 – 7 December 2022) was a German politician from the Christian Social Union of Bavaria. He was Mayor of Ingolstadt between 1984 and 2002.

== Biography ==
After graduating from high school in Eichstätt, he earned his living as a miner in the Aachen district. The farmer's son, who comes from Pfahldorf, then studied economics in Cologne and Munich. From 1960 to 1984, he held a managerial position at Schubert & Salzer in Ingolstadt. From 1984 Amler was the professional mayor of the city of Ingolstadt and at the same time head of the finance department there. During his time in the town hall, he also held the position of chairman of the Ingolstadt Lebenshilfe. After his 18-year term in office ended in 2002, he was a member of the administrative committee of the Ingolstadt Employment Agency and a member of the supervisory board of the non-profit housing association Ingolstadt mbH until 2004. He was also president of the International Simon Mayr Society until 2003.
