= Christian Baretti =

German politician

Christian Baretti (born 2 July 1973 in Munich) is a German politician, representative of the Christian Social Union of Bavaria.

== See also ==
- List of Christian Social Union of Bavaria politicians
