= Ernst Dietz =

German politician (born 1943)

- Born: 27 May 1943 (age 82); Waldsassen, Bavaria, Germany
- Occupation: Politician
- Political party: Christian Social Union of Bavaria

Ernst Dietz (born 27 May 1943) is a German politician from the Christian Social Union of Bavaria. He was a member of the Landtag of Bavaria from 1970 to 1982.
