= Annette von Aretin =

Annette von Aretin (23 May 1920 in Bamberg – 1 March 2006 in Munich) was christened Marie Adelheid Kunigunde Felicitas Elisabeth, Freiin von Aretin.

She was the first Bavarian television announcer. She gained popularity by appearing on the panel of Robert Lembke's quiz show Was bin ich? (What is my profession?), which was broadcast on German national television, for 34 years.
