= Carljörg Lacherbauer =

German jurist, civil servant and politician

- Born: 23 June 1902; Munich, Germany
- Died: 30 March 1967 (aged 64); Bad Tölz, Bavaria, Germany
- Occupations: Jurist and politician
- Political party: Christian Social Union of Bavaria; Bavaria Party

Carl Hannsjörg Lacherbauer (23 June 1902 – 30 March 1967) was a German jurist, civil servant and politician. He was one of the co-founders of the Christian Social Union of Bavaria. He was a member of the Landtag of Bavaria from 1946 to 1958. In 1953 he affiliated to the Bavaria Party and was elected deputy chairman of the parliamentary group of the BP from 1954 to 1957.
