= Michael Hofmann (politician) =

German politician (born 1974)

Member of the Landtag of Bavaria
- Incumbent
- Assumed office 7 October 2013
- Preceded by: Eduard Nöth
- Constituency: Forchheim

Personal details
- Born: 14 June 1974 (age 52) Forchheim
- Party: Christian Social Union (since 1993)

Michael Hofmann (born 14 June 1974 in Forchheim) is a German politician serving as a member of the Landtag of Bavaria since 2013. He has served as chairman of the Christian Social Union in Forchheim since 2015.
