= Martin Kastler =

German politician (born 1974)

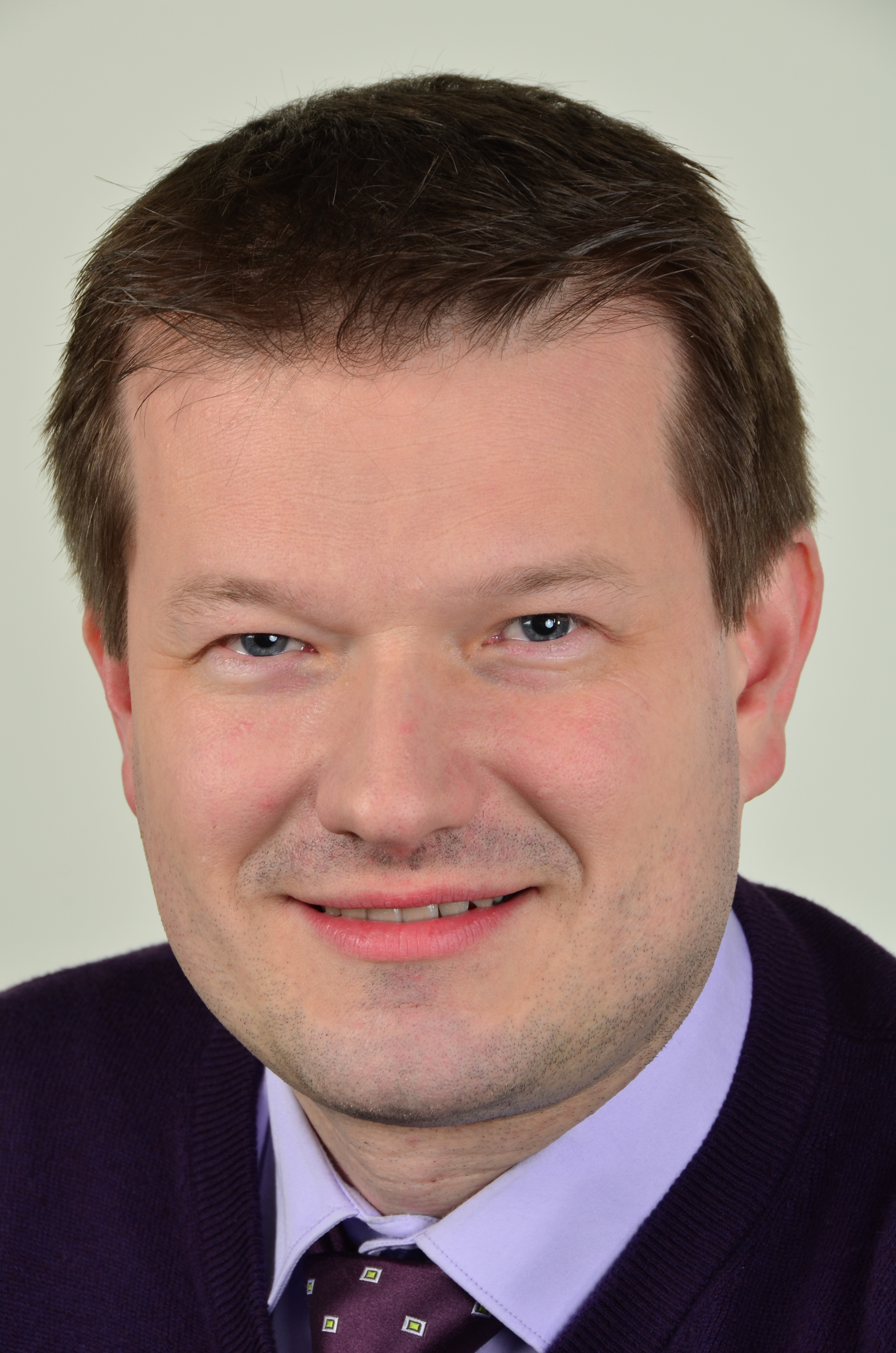
- Kastler in February 2014

Member of European Parliament
- In office 2003–2004; 2009–2014

Personal details
- Born: 1974 (age 51–52) Nuremberg, West Germany
- Party: Christian Social Union of Bavaria

Martin Kastler (born 1974 in Nuremberg) was a German politician of the Christian Social Union of Bavaria (CSU) who was a Member of the European Parliament from 2003 until 2004 and from 2009 until 2014.

== Early life and career ==
After attending the Martin-Behaim-Gymnasium in Nuremberg Kastler studied history and political sciences in Erlangen and Prague. From 1996 to 1997, he gathered experience in the field of European policy as an employee in the Foreign Policy Department of the President of the Czech Republic, Václav Havel. Thereafter, he became press spokesman for the Nuremberg Metropole region and editor for DATEV. Since 1996, he worked freelance as a journalist and publicist. From 2004 until his re-entrance into the European Parliament in December 2008, he was head of the Development Policy Department and Coordinator for EU-Projects for the Hanns Seidel Foundation. After leaving the European Parliament, he headed the Central European project of the Hanns Seidel Foundation based in Prague as a representative and regional manager, responsible for the activities of the CSU-affiliated foundation in the Czech Republic, Slovakia and Hungary. After returning to the foundation headquarters, he moved to the Bavarian State Chancellery in Munich and worked as personal advisor to the two state ministers Melanie Huml and afterwards Eric Beißwenger. In April 2024 he was appointed head of the Representation of the Free State of Bavaria in the Czech Republic.

Martin Kastler is married, has three children and lives in Schwabach and Prague

== Political career ==
Kastler has been a member of the CSU since 1993.

=== Member of Parliament ===
Kastler's first term in European Parliament for the CSU spanned 2003 to 2004, as successor of Emilia Müller, who was called to government by the former minister-president of Bavaria, Edmund Stoiber. After the Bavarian regional elections in September 2008, Kastler succeeded Alexander Radwan. At the European elections in 2009, Martin Kastler was elected as the Member of the European Parliament for the whole legislative period of 2009-2014.

== Committees and delegations ==
Kastler was member of the Committee on Employment and Social Affairs and a substitute member of the Committee on Development. He was member of the Delegation EU-Former Yugoslav Republic of Macedonia and a substitute member of the Delegation to the Joint Parliamentary Assembly EU-ACP, spokesman for Social and Development Policy of the CSU group in the European Parliament and vice chairman of the Intergroup "Bioethics" and the EPP Working Group "Bioethics" in the European Parliament.

== Honorary activities ==
Kastler was more than 12 years chairman of the Sudeten German-Czech Ackermann Gemeinde, based in Munich. In October 2022 he decided not to run for chairman again. Nearly ten years he was elected as European spokesman for the German Catholics in the ZdK, based in Bonn.

In 2012, German Federal Foreign Minister Guido Westerwelle appointed Martin Kastler as one of four German representatives on a voluntary basis to the board of directors of the German-Czech Future Fund in Prague. From 2016 to 2020 he was its chairman. Kastler resigned voluntarily from his mandate in December 2023.

== Honors ==
The Foreign Minister of the Czech Republic, Jan Lipavský, awarded Martin Kastler the medal in 2023 for his long-standing commitment and services to German-Czech, in particular Bavarian-Czech understanding for Diplomacy.

== The First European Citizens' Initiative for a Europe-wide protection of the Sunday ==
Kastler is an initiator of the First European Citizens' Initiative whose aim is to protect Sundays as a day of rest Europe-wide. To that end, he presented the Online-Campagneportal "Mum and Dad belong to us on Sunday!" on 10 February 2010 at the European Parliament in Strasbourg.

Kastler believes that Sunday needs to be protected as a work-free day of family and rest in order that children do not run the risk of suffering from today's flexibilisation of the business world. His view is that the key to a successful protection of children is giving parents time for them. Thus, the introduction of a work-free Sunday contributes to turning Europe into the world's most child-oriented area. He hints at the historical entrenchment of the work-free Sunday in the European social welfare net as well as at the proven advantages of a free weekday on health.
