= Kurt Eckstein =

German politician

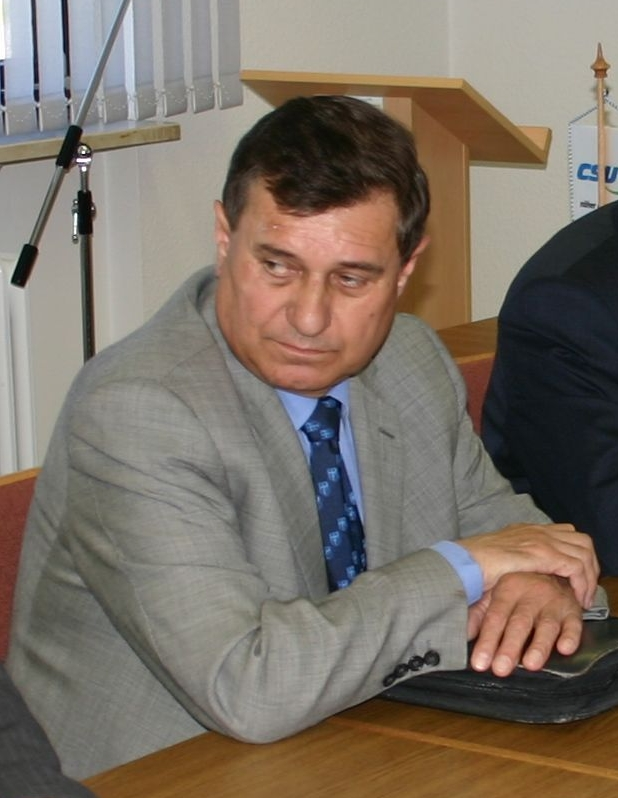
- Born: 12 March 1947 (age 79); Altdorf bei Nürnberg, Nürnberger Land, Germany
- Occupation: Politician
- Political party: Christian Social Union of Bavaria
- Website: http://www.kurt-eckstein.de/

Kurt Eckstein (born 12 March 1947) is a German politician from the Christian Social Union of Bavaria. He has been a member of the Landtag of Bavaria since 1990.
