= Marianne Deml =

German politician

Marianne Deml (born 8 March 1949) is a German politician, representative of the Christian Social Union of Bavaria. Since 1990 she has been a member of the Landtag of Bavaria. From June 1993 to January 2001 she was State Secretary in the Bavarian State Ministry for Food, Agriculture and Forestry.

== See also ==
- List of Bavarian Christian Social Union politicians
