= Eismann =

Eismann is a German surname, meaning "iceman". Notable people include:

- Daniel T. Eismann, American judge
- Johann Anton Eismann, Austrian painter
- Pavel Eismann, Czech footballer
- Peter Eismann, German politician
- Sören Eismann, German footballer
