= Peter Menacher =

German politician (born 1939)

Peter Menacher (born 29 November 1939 in Augsburg, Germany) was the mayor of Augsburg for twelve years between 1990 and 2002. He was a member of the Christian Social Union of Bavaria.
