= Matthias Dießl =

German politician

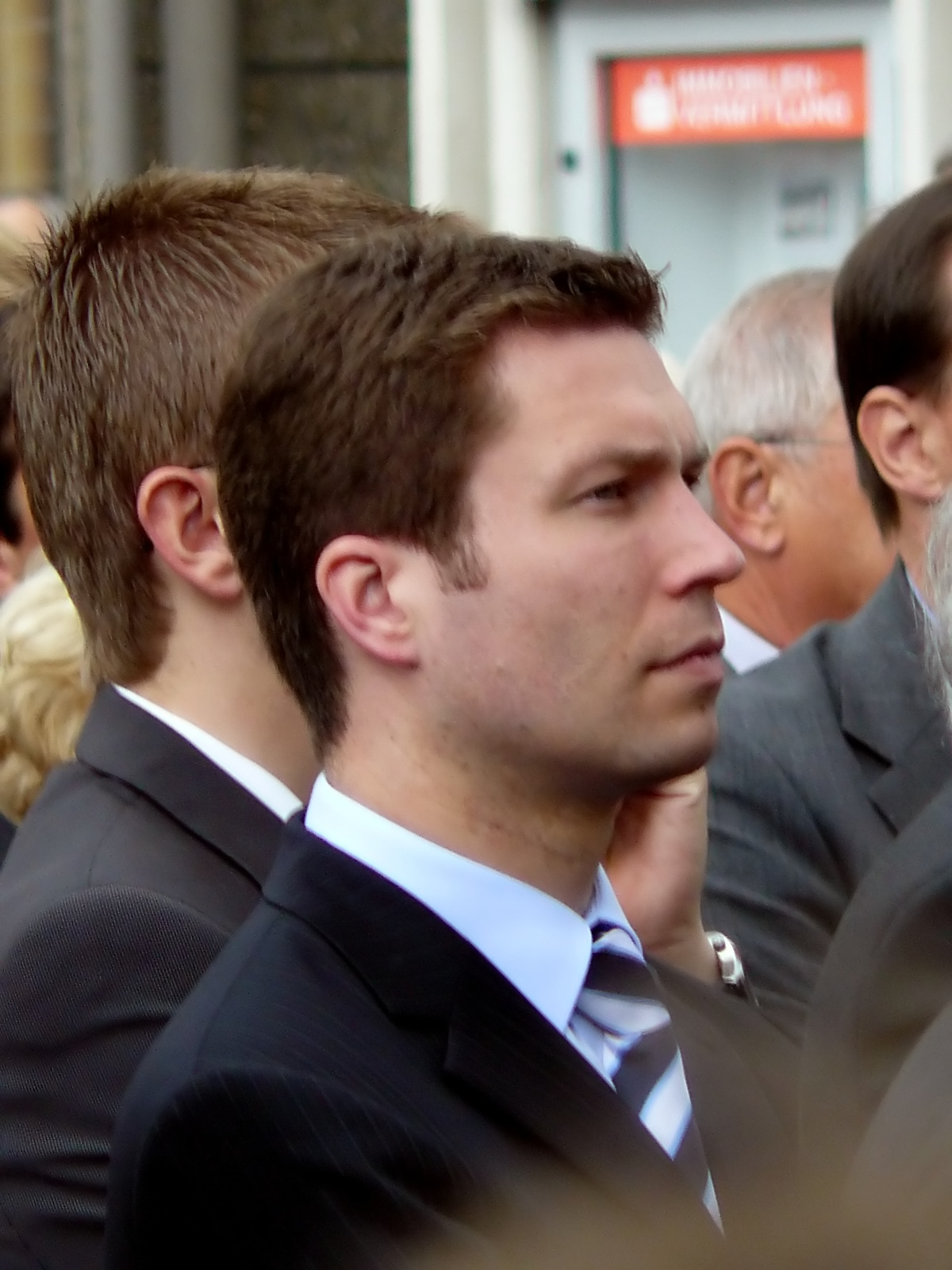
Dießl at the opening of the Nuremberg U-Bahn station Gustav-Adolf-Straße in 2008

Matthias Dießl (born 6 December 1975) is a German politician, representative of the Christian Social Union of Bavaria. He is the District Administrator for the rural district of Fürth since 2008.

== See also ==
- List of Bavarian Christian Social Union politicians
