= Alfred Dreier =

German jurist and politician

- Born: 20 January 1940; Munich, Bavaria, Germany
- Died: 16 February 2011 (aged 71)
- Occupations: Jurist and politician
- Political party: Christian Social Union of Bavaria

Alfred Dreier (20 January 1940 – 16 February 2011) was a German jurist and local politician from the Christian Social Union of Bavaria. He occupied some posts including Minister of Culture of Bavaria from 1986 to 1987.

== Honours ==
- 1995: Order of Merit of the Federal Republic of Germany
- 1998: Medal for outstanding services to the local government
