= Georg Brauchle =

German politician

Georg Brauchle (29 August 1915 - 23 April 1968) was a German politician for the Christian Social Union of Bavaria.

From 1960 until his death in 1968, he was the deputy mayor of Munich under Hans-Jochen Vogel.

The city's northern ring road, the Georg-Brauchle-Ring, is named after him, which in turn provides the name for the Georg-Brauchle-Ring subway station.

== See also ==
- List of Bavarian Christian Social Union politicians
