= Heinz Donhauser =

German politician (born 1951)

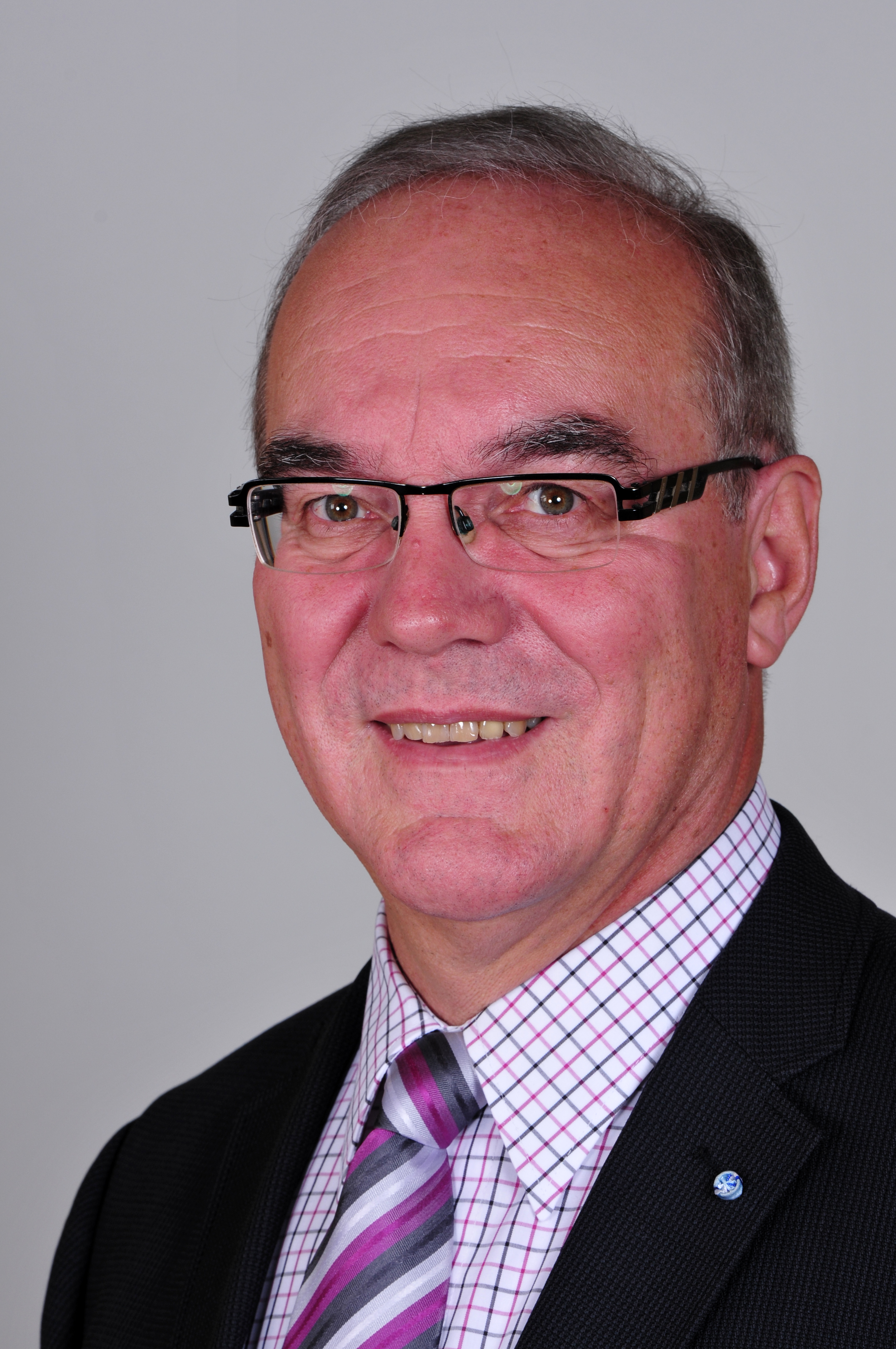
Heinz Donhauser in 2012

Heinz Donhauser (born 22 June 1951 in Amberg) is a German politician, representative of the Christian Social Union of Bavaria. He is a member of the Landtag of Bavaria.

== See also ==
- List of Bavarian Christian Social Union politicians
