= Peter Eismann =

German politician (born 1957)

Peter Eismann (born April 8, 1957, in Frensdorf) is a German politician, representative of the Christian Social Union of Bavaria.

From 2007 to 2008 he was a member of the Landtag of Bavaria.

== See also ==
- List of Bavarian Christian Social Union politicians
