= Toni Donhauser =

German politician

Toni Donhauser (13 March 1921 - 12 December 1990) was a German politician and representative of the Christian Social Union of Bavaria. He was a member of the Landtag of Bavaria from 1974 to 1982.

== See also ==
- List of Bavarian Christian Social Union politicians
