= Erwin Georg Keilholz =

Erwin Georg Keilholz (20 April 1930 – 19 May 2001) was a Bavarian educator and politician, a member of the Christian Social Union (CSU).

Keilholz studied in Bamberg, graduating in both Mathematics and Physics in 1949. He then studied teaching, first working at an elementary school in Ebermannstadt. He trained as a middle school teacher in Munich, and in 1956 began teaching at a middle school in Coburg. He also taught at schools in Forchheim and Herzogenaurach.

Keilholz was a member of the Young Union. From 1958 to 1972 he was chairman of the CSU in Ebermannstadt. He was elected to the Kreistag (district council) from 1960 to 1972 as a deputy of the Governor. He was a member of the Landtag of Bavaria from 1974 to 1978.
