= Martin Fink (politician) =

German politician

Martin Fink (born 5 February 1950) is a German politician, representative of the Christian Social Union of Bavaria. Since 2008 he has been a member of the Landtag of Bavaria.

== See also ==
- List of Bavarian Christian Social Union politicians
