= Melanie Oßwald =

German politician

Melanie Oßwald (born 1 June 1976 in Nuremberg) is a German politician and a former member of the Bundestag with the CSU.

From 1996 to 2000 she studied graphic design at the College of Fine Arts in Nuremberg. She entered the Junge Union in 1992 and the CSU in 2000. In 2002 she campaigned for election to the Bundestag, but narrowly lost. However, since Edmund Stoiber did not accept his Bundestag mandate due to his defeat by Gerhard Schröder, she nevertheless managed to advance. She was not re-elected in 2005.
