= Eric Beißwenger =

German politician (born 1972)

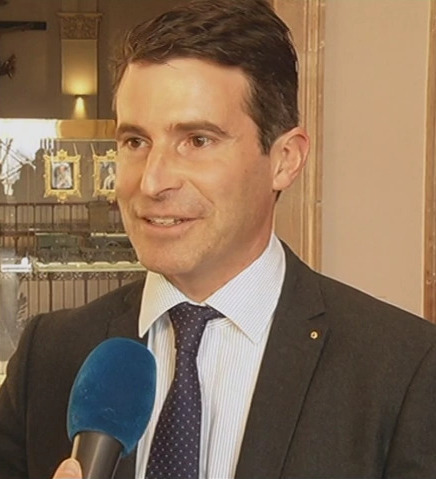
- Beißwenger in 2014

Minister of European and International Affairs of Bavaria
- Incumbent
- Assumed office 8 November 2023
- Minister-President: Markus Söder
- Preceded by: Melanie Huml

Personal details
- Born: 26 July 1972 (age 53) Mannheim
- Party: Christian Social Union

Eric Beißwenger (born 26 July 1972 in Mannheim) is a German politician serving as minister of European and international affairs of Bavaria since 2023. He has been a member of the Landtag of Bavaria since 2013. He has served as chairman of the Christian Social Union in Oberallgäu since 2017, and served as chairman of the party in Bad Hindelang from 2011 to 2019.
