= List of presidents of the Landtag of Bavaria =

This article lists the presidents of the Landtag of Bavaria from 1819 to the present day.

== List ==
Political Party: NLP SPD BVP (1869–1887 Bavarian Patriotic Party, 1887–1918 Bavarian Centre Party) NSDAP CSU None

Portrait	Name	Political party	Term of office
Presidents of the Chamber of Deputies
	Sebastian von Schrenck	Independent	1819–1837
	Karl von Seinsheim	Independent	1840–1843
	Hermann von Rotenhan	Independent	1845–1847
	Karl Friedrich Heintz	Independent	1848
	Karl Kirchgessner	Independent	1848
	Gustav von Lerchenfeld	Independent	1849
	Friedrich von Hegnenberg	Independent	1849–1865
	Josef Pözl	Independent	1865–1869
	Ludwig von Weis	Bavarian Patriotic Party	1870–1871
	Karl von Ow	Bavarian Patriotic Party	1871–1872
	Franz von Stauffenberg	National Liberal Party	1873–1875
	Karl von Ow	Bavarian Patriotic Party	1875–1892
	Johann Baptiste von Walter	Bavarian Centre Party	1893–1897
	August von Clemm	National Liberal Party	1897–1899
	Georg von Orterer	Bavarian Centre Party	1899–1916
	Theobald von Fuchs	Bavarian Centre Party	1917–1918
President of the Provisional National Council
	Franz Schmitt	Social Democratic Party of Germany	1918–1919
Presidents of the Landtag of Bavaria
	Franz Schmitt	Social Democratic Party of Germany	1919–1920
	Heinrich Königbauer	Bavarian People's Party	1920–1929
	Georg Stang	Bavarian People's Party	1929–1933
	Hermann Esser	Nazi Party	1933
Chairman of the Bayerische Beratende Landesauschuss
	Georg Stang	Christian Social Union	1946
President of the Bayerische Verfassunggebende Landesversammlung
	Michael Horlacher	Christian Social Union	1946
Presidents of the Landtag of Bavaria
	Michael Horlacher	Christian Social Union	1946–1950
	Georg Stang	Christian Social Union	1950–1951
	Alois Hundhammer	Christian Social Union	1951–1954
	Hans Ehard	Christian Social Union	1954–1960
	Rudolf Hanauer	Christian Social Union	1960–1978
	Franz Heubl	Christian Social Union	1978–1990
	Wilhelm Vorndran	Christian Social Union	1990–1994
	Johann Böhm	Christian Social Union	1994–2003
	Alois Glück	Christian Social Union	2003–2008
	Barbara Stamm	Christian Social Union	2008–2018
	Ilse Aigner	Christian Social Union	2018–present

== See also ==
- Bavaria
- Politics of Bavaria
- Landtag of Bavaria

== Sources ==
- Präsidenten von 1819 bis 1946
- Balke, Hilde (2001): Die Präsidenten des bayerischen Landtags von 1946 bis 1994, Bayerische Landtag, Munich ISBN 3-927924-23-7
