= Katholische Landjugendbewegung =

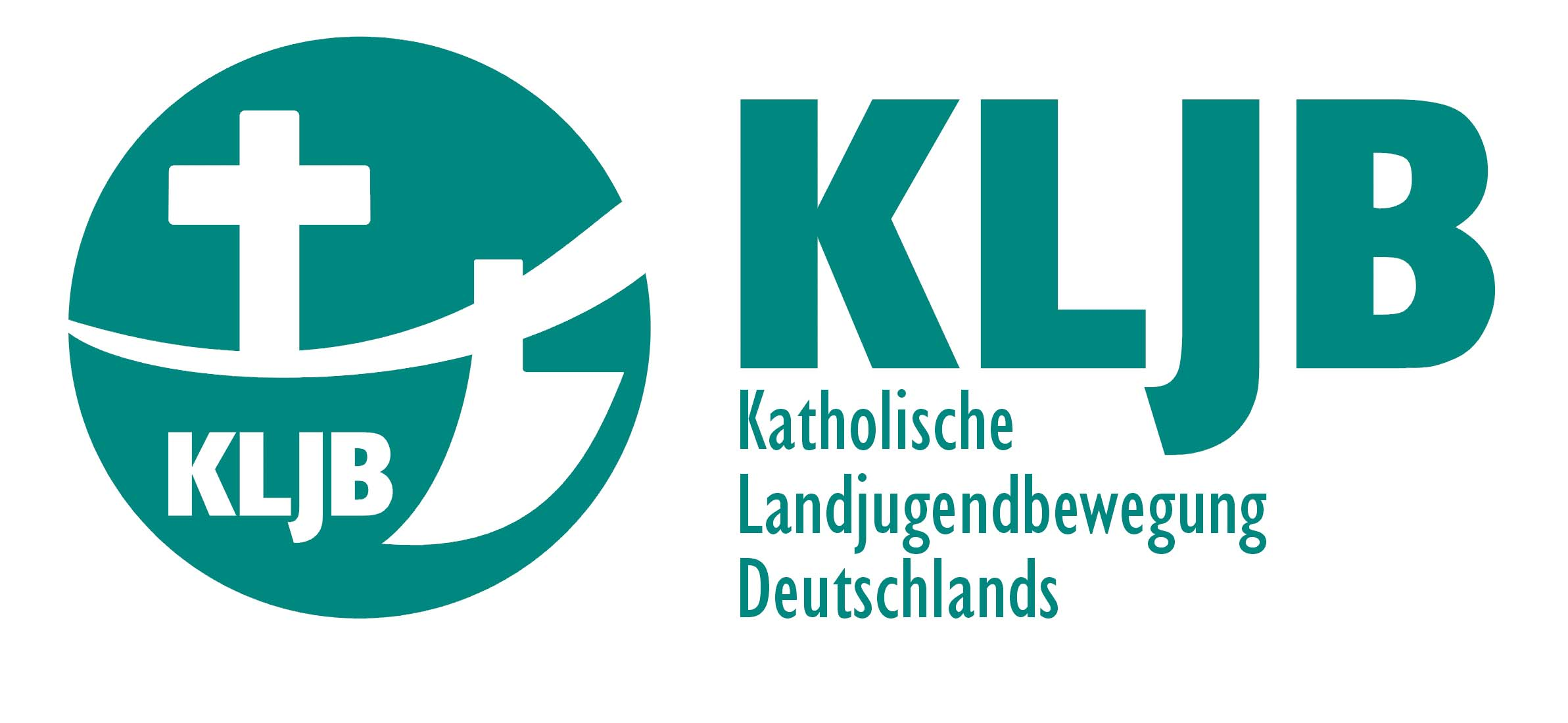
- Logo of KLJB
- Formation: 1947; 79 years ago., Hardehausen, Germany
- Type: Non-governmental organization
- Legal status: Association
- Purpose: Rural areas, agriculture, solidarity, environmentalism, faith, youth politics
- Headquarters: Bad Honnef, Germany
- Region served: Germany
- Members: 70,000
- Federal chairman: Jannis Fughe
- Federal chairwomen: Daniela Ordowski, Sarah Schulte-Döinghaus
- Federal pastoral: Carola Lutz
- Main organ: General assembly, formed by delegates of the diocesan levels.
- Staff: 20 (2018)
- Volunteers: 5,000
- Website: www.kljb.org
- Formerly called: Action of the rural youth ("Aktion Landjugend")

The Catholic rural youth Movement of Germany (CARYM) (German: Katholische Landjugendbewegung Deutschlands, KLJB) is a Catholic youth organization which is mainly active in rural areas in Germany.

== History ==
The movement was founded in 1947 inside its nowadays umbrella organization Union of the German Catholic Youth (German: Bund der Deutschen Katholischen Jugend, BDKJ). In the first years, the name of KLJB was "Action of the rural youth" (German: Aktion Landjugend). Main actions in the founding years were "rural seminars" to discuss rural formation and the social situation in the villages in rural areas. The members of KLJB developed five educational objectives in the 1950s and chose the association's patron Nicholas of Flüe. During the time, MIJARC (French: Mouvement Internationale de la Jeunesse Agricole et Rurale Catholique) was founded as international "Catholic Agricultural and Rural Youth Movement" (CARYM). KLJB was one of its founding members. In 1961, KLJB's umbrella organization BDKJ decided to build KLJB as independent federal association in Germany and to have it as one of the member organizations in BDKJ. The name of the former "Action of the rural youth" was finally switched to its today's name.

In the 1970s, topics like democracy, social justice and peace were main issues, but also the merging of the men's youth and the women's youth of KLJB into one common association with a common federal board. Since that time, the boards on local, regional, diocesan and federal levels are elected due to gender parity. In the 1980s, KLJB focused on ecology and energy politics, but also on the formation of the rural areas. A big mile stone in the 1990s was the introduction of the campaign "eco fair wear" (German: Öko-fair tragen) and the founding of the clothing brand LamuLamu, which was labeled as "highly recommended" by "Label online" concerning standards, independence, controlling and transparency.

== Organization ==
With its 70,000 members KLJB is one of the biggest youth movements in Germany. The organization makes an effort in its 1,900 local groups for the rural youth' interests in church, politics and society. KLJB's members are especially youth people and young adults with 14 years or olders. In some of the diocesan associations of KLJB there is also the possibility for younger ones to be member. Starting at local level up to diocesan and federal level, over 5,000 young people are involved voluntarily in KLJB as leaders of the local groups, in activities organized by the movement and in the organs of KLJB. The federal office of KLJB is located in Bad Honnef-Rhöndorf in North Rhine-Westphalia.

The association is connecting with political and religious institutions and also with other associations and organizations. It is known as an expert organization for young people in rural areas.

The different local and regional groups in 20 different diocesan association are helping each other to reach the aims of the organization.

KLJB is member in its umbrella organization Bund der Deutschen Katholischen Jugend (BDKJ), member of the Climate-Alliance Germany and advisory member in the German Agrarbündnis. Its European and global interest are represented in the international Catholic Agricultural and Rural Youth Movement (MIJARC)

At state level, there is a specificity in Bavaria, where KLJB with its 26,000 members is a recognized youth association in the Bavarian farmer's association (German: Bayerischer Bauernverband) – beside the Protestant rural youth organization and the Bavarian young farmer's association.

Patron is the national saint of Switzerland, Nicholas of Flüe, whose saint's day is on 25 September. KLJB is working close together with the German Catholic Rural People's Movement (German: Katholische Landvolkbewegung), which was founded by adult members of KLJB after their time in the youth movement.

== Topics ==
The association is:

1. a movement of young Christians
2. a place, where young people live together
3. a movement in rural areas
4. an ecological movement
5. a movement, which is committed to International solidarity

== Famous members ==
- Alois Glück (German politician, Christian Social Union in Bavaria, former member and president of the Bavarian Landtag, former president of the Central Committee of German Catholics)
- Josef Miller (German politician, Christian Social Union in Bavaria, former member of the Bavarian Landtag (1986–2014), former Bavarian State Minister for Nutrition, Agriculture and Forest (1998–2008))
- Gerd Müller (German politician, Christian Social Union in Bavaria, Member of the German Bundestag, German Federal Minister for Economic Cooperation and Development since 2013)
- Marianne Schieder (German politician, Social Democratic Party of Germany, Member of the German Bundestag (since 2005), former Federal chairwoman of KLJB)
- Theo Waigel (German politician, Christian Social Union in Bavaria, former member of the German Bundestag (1972–2002), German Federal Minister of Finance (in office 21 April 1989 – 27 October 1998))

== See also ==
- Bund der Deutschen Katholischen Jugend
- MIJARC
