= Karl von Seinsheim =

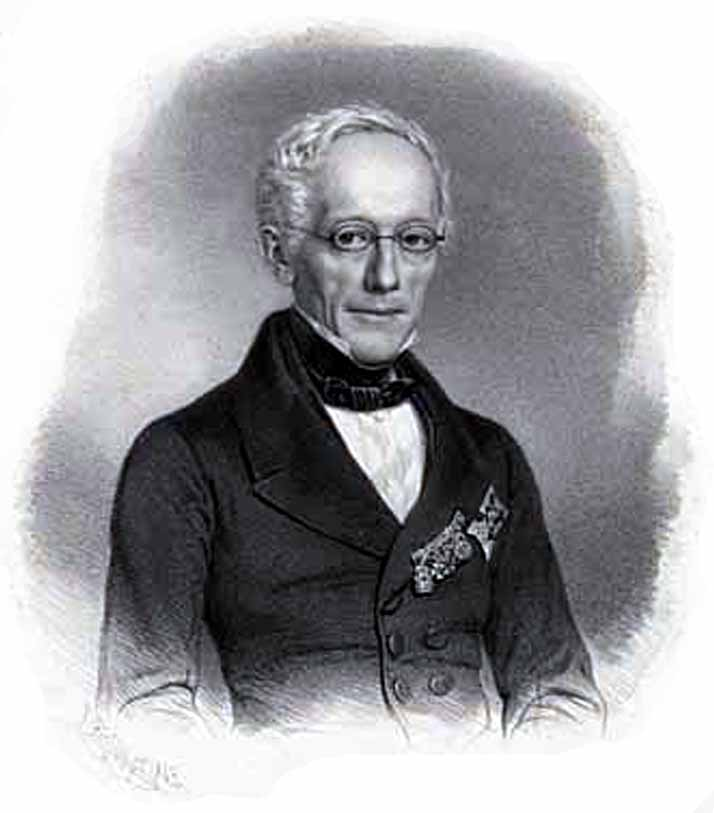

Bavarian Minister of Finance
- In office 1840–1847

Member of the Bavarian Chamber of Deputies
- In office 1827–1846

Personal details
- Born: 17 February 1784 Munich, Electorate of Bavaria, Holy Roman Empire
- Died: 26 November 1864 (aged 80) Munich, Kingdom of Bavaria, German Confederation

Karl August Joseph Maria Donatus, Count of Seinsheim (17 February 1784 in Munich – 26 November 1864 in Munich) was the Bavarian Finance Minister and President of the Bavarian Chamber of Deputies (German: Präsident der Bayerischen Abgeordnetenkammer).

== Biography ==
Karl Graf von Seinsheim was the son of the statesman Maximilian Joseph Clemens Maria von Seinsheim (1751–1803) and his wife Maria Anna Freiin von Franckenstein (1754–1832). He was educated privately and then studied jurisprudence at the Ludwig-Maximilians-Universität in Landshut and the University of Göttingen. He then accompanied Ludwig, Crown Prince of Bavaria on a trip to Italy. In 1806, he held administrative posts in Bavaria's Directorate-General in Munich. He was a member of the government councils of the administrative districts of the Etschkreis (Trento) in 1808, Regenkreis (Straubing) in 1809, Salzachkreis (Salzburg) in 1810, and Isarkreis (Munich) in 1817. Between 1824 and 1832, he was 2. Director and from 1832 to 1840 President of the Government of the Isarkreis (from 1837 Upper Bavaria). In 1837, he became State Councilor and from 1840 to 1847 he was Minister of Finance. Since 1827, he was a member of the Bavarian Chamber of Deputies (German: der Bayerischen Abgeordnetenkammer), from which he retired 1846 after he served as its president from 1840 to 1843. In 1846, he became a lifelong member of the Imperial Council (German: Reichsrat). He retired as State Councilor on 25 February 1848.

== Marriage and family ==
On 27 December 1808, Karl Graf von Seinsheim married Isabella Gräfin von Lodron-Laterano (1787–1816), with whom he had two sons and two daughters.

== Literature ==
- Walter Schärl: Die Zusammensetzung der bayerischen Beamtenschaft von 1806 bis 1918 (= Münchner historische Studien. Abt. Bayerische Geschichte, Band 1). Lassleben, Kallmünz 1955.
- Hö: Seinsheim, Karl August Joseph Maria Donatus Graf von. In: Karl Bosl (hrsg.): Bosls Bayerische Biographie. Pustet, Regensburg 1983-1988
