= Federal Agency for Civic Education =

German federal government agency

Coordinates: 50°43′40″N 7°06′33″E

- Bundeszentrale für politische Bildung

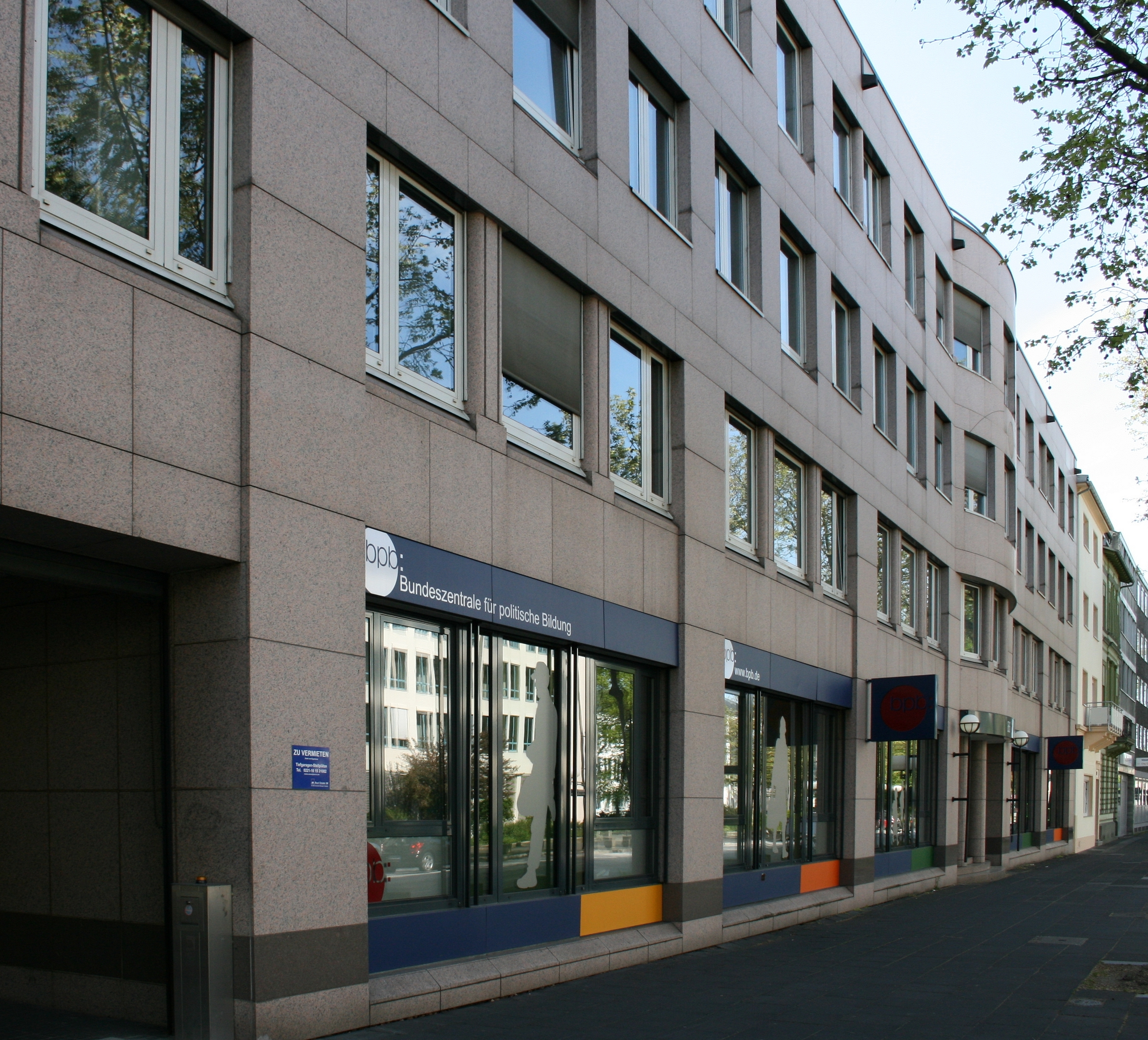

Agency overview
- Formed: 25 November 1952 (73 years ago)
- Jurisdiction: Government of Germany
- Headquarters: Bonn, Germany
- Employees: 450+
- Annual budget: €100.1 million (2024)
- Agency executive: Volker Ullrich, Vice President, provisional director
- Website: www.bpb.de

The Federal Agency for Civic Education (FACE, German: Bundeszentrale für politische Bildung (bpb)) is a German federal government agency responsible for promoting civic education. It is subordinated to the Federal Ministry of the Interior. Thomas Krüger has served as president of the agency since 2000. The modern agency was established in West Germany in 1952 by the Adenauer government to counteract communism during the Cold War, but it has its roots in earlier government agencies dating back to the First World War.

== Objective ==
In 1997 the objectives for bpb were specified, and these were officially defined in 2001. Its task is now to promote understanding of political issues, strengthen awareness for democracy and willingness to participate in political processes amongst the citizen.

Furthermore, a committee of 22 members of the Bundestag is responsible for monitoring the effectiveness and political neutrality of the bpb.

Bpb publishes Informationen zur politischen Bildung (a magazine published quarterly) and Aus Politik und Zeitgeschichte (APuZ), a weekly topical journal of essays and academic articles. German, Arabic, Turkish and Russian versions of the Grundgesetz can be ordered for free by anyone living in Germany. Furthermore, it offers extensive material, e.g. books, journals and information material for schools on contemporary topics in politics, history, sociology and economy.

A number of congresses, symposia and excursions are organised by bpb either directly for citizens or for experts on selected topics. Furthermore, bpb co-operates with a number of political foundations, associations and organisations committed to civic education.

== History ==
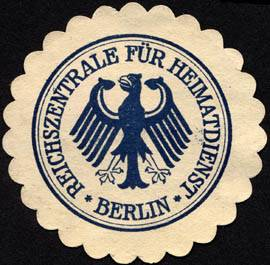
The seal of the Reichszentrale für Heimatdienst, c. 1925

The Agency has its background in the propaganda war of World War I. In October 1914 the Zentrale für Auslandsdienst (Agency for Foreign Service) was established for the purpose of propaganda conducted outside Germany. In 1918 it was complemented by the Zentralstelle für Heimatdienst (Agency for Homeland Service) which was formed for the purpose of domestic propaganda; in order to strengthen the public resilience during the war. In the Weimar Republic it was renamed as the Reichszentrale für Heimatsdienst (Reich Agency for Homeland Service).

Heimatdienst, which literally means homeland service, may also be translated as "domestic propaganda" or "political explanation/education in the homeland".

Following the Nazi ascent to power in Germany the agency was dissolved on 16 March 1933. The facilities and staff of the agency were incorporated into the new Ministry of Public Enlightenment and Propaganda headed by Joseph Goebbels and responsible for enforcing Nazi doctrine on the people and controlling public opinion.

The Agency was re-established on November 25, 1952 as the Bundeszentrale für Heimatdienst (Federal Agency for Homeland Service), and in 1963 it was renamed as the Bundeszentrale für politische Bildung (Federal Agency for Civic Education). It can also be translated as "Federal Agency for Political Education", as in the German language "civic education" normally translates as "Bürgerschaftliche Erziehung", of which "Politische Bildung" represents just a sub-category.

The initial primary focus of the activities of the re-established agency during the 1950s was to counteract Communism in West Germany.

== Voting advice ==
The agency runs a voting advice application website Wahl-O-Mat, which compares the user's political position with the platforms of the parties and shows all parties ranked for closeness to the user's position. The tool was originally developed for young, internet savvy voters and the questions asked to determine user preferences were chosen accordingly by a young team. In 2026 Neue Zürcher Zeitung journalists questioned the Federal Agencies concept, pointing out that the majority of the users was by now older and the questions asked did not correspond to their realities anymore, while the Agency did not explicitly inform users that their app was still aimed at a younger demographic.

== State agencies ==
In addition to the federal agency, 15 of Germany's 16 states each have their own state agency for civic education. These agencies are independent from the federal agency, and subordinated to the state governments, usually to the state ministry of the interior. The agencies are:

- State Agency for Civic Education of Baden-Württemberg
- Bavarian State Agency for Civic Education
- State Agency for Civic Education of Berlin
- State Agency for Civic Education of Brandenburg
- State Agency for Civic Education of Bremen
- State Agency for Civic Education of Hamburg
- Hessian State Agency for Civic Education
- State Agency for Civic Education of Mecklenburg-Vorpommern
- State Agency for Civic Education of North Rhine-Westphalia
- State Agency for Civic Education of Rhineland-Palatinate
- State Agency for Civic Education of Saarland
- Saxon State Agency for Civic Education
- State Agency for Civic Education of Saxony-Anhalt
- State Agency for Civic Education of Schleswig-Holstein
- State Agency for Civic Education of Thuringia
