= Claudia Stamm =

German politician

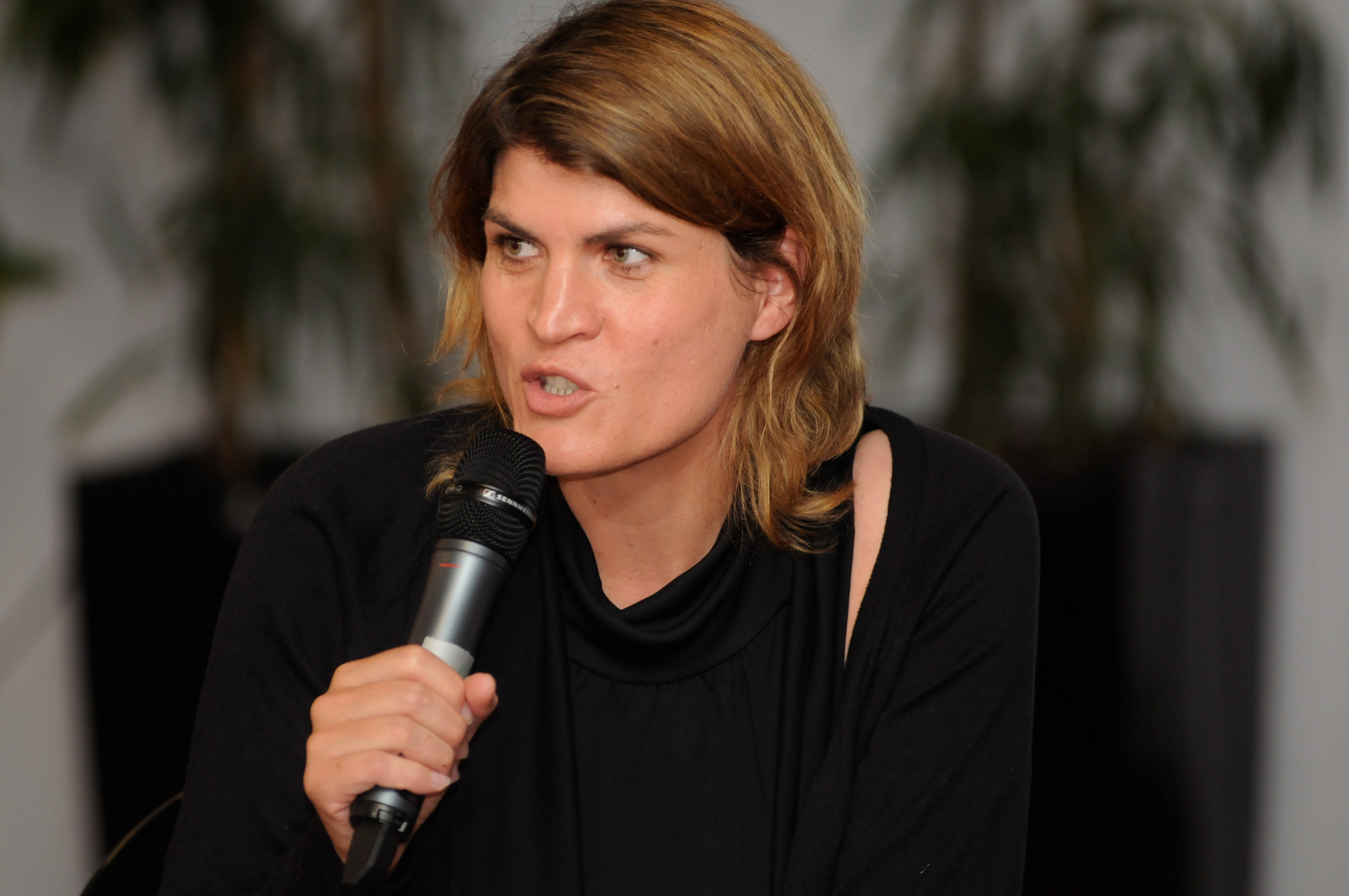
- Stamm campaigning in 2011

Co-founder of Mut

Personal details
- Born: Claudia Stamm; 8 October 1970 (age 55) Würzburg, Franconia, Bavaria, West Germany
- Party: Mut (2017–present)
- Other political affiliations: Greens (2009–2017)
- Children: 5
- Education: Political science at Catholic University of Eichstätt-Ingolstadt, University of Cologne, and University of Salamanca
- Website: http://claudia-stamm.de/

Claudia Stamm (born 8 October 1970) is a German politician.

== Early life and education ==
Stamm, born on 8 October 1970 in Würzburg of Bavaria, graduated from the Wirsberg-Gymnasium high school in Würzburg in 1990. She spent one year as an exchange student in Illinois, USA. She went on to complete her Master's in political science specialising in women's studies at the Eichstätt-Ingolstadt university, then at the University of Cologne, and at the University of Salamanca in Spain. After working for a women's association, she was employed in 1999 by Bayerischer Rundfunk as a freelance writer and editor.

== Political career ==
On 3 April 2009, Stamm joined the political party Alliance 90/The Greens and was elected member of the Bavarian state parliament. In March 2017, she resigned from the party and carried on her mandate as an independent until October 2018 when she resigned from the state parliament.

In 2017, Stamm became one of the co-founders and chair person of the Mut political party. (Note: "Mut" in German means "courage.") Stamm and the Mut party are in alliance with Yanis Varoufakis for the 2019 European Parliament election.

== Personal life ==
Claudia Stamm is the daughter of Ludwig Stamm and the Christian Social Union politician and former state parliament president Barbara Stamm.

She was married to photographer Hajü Staudt, co-founder or the Mut party, until his sudden death in Munich from a heart attack on 30 July 2018, aged 59. They had two daughters and, from Staudt's previous marriage, three stepchildren.
