= Catholic Church in Europe =

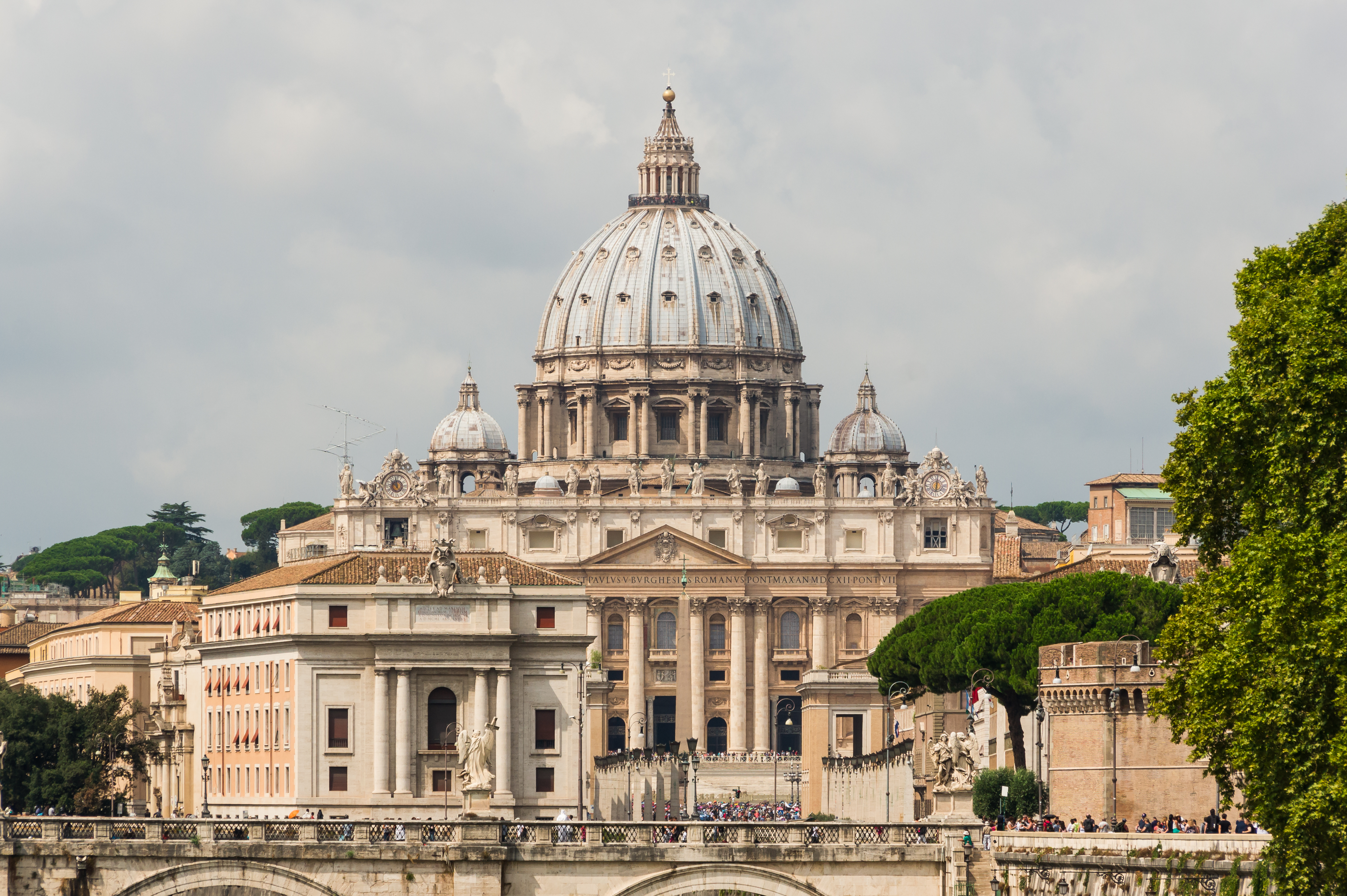
Saint Peter's Basilica in Vatican City State.

The Catholic Church in Europe is part of the worldwide Catholic Church in full communion with the Holy See in Rome, including represented Eastern Catholic missions. Demographically, Catholics are the largest religious group in Europe.

== Demographics ==
Adherence to Catholicism in Europe (2010)

About 35% of the population of Europe today is Catholic, but only about a quarter of all Catholics worldwide reside in Europe. This is due in part to the movement and immigration at various times of largely Catholic European ethnic groups (such as the Irish, Italians, Poles, Portuguese, and Spaniards) to continents such as the Americas and Australia. Furthermore, Catholicism has been spread outside Europe through both historical Catholic missionary activity, especially in Latin America, and the past colonization and conversion of native people by Catholic European countries, specifically the Spanish, Portuguese, French and Belgian colonial empire, in regions such as South America, the Caribbean, Central Africa and West Africa, and Southeast Asia.

== The Holy See and the European episcopal conferences ==
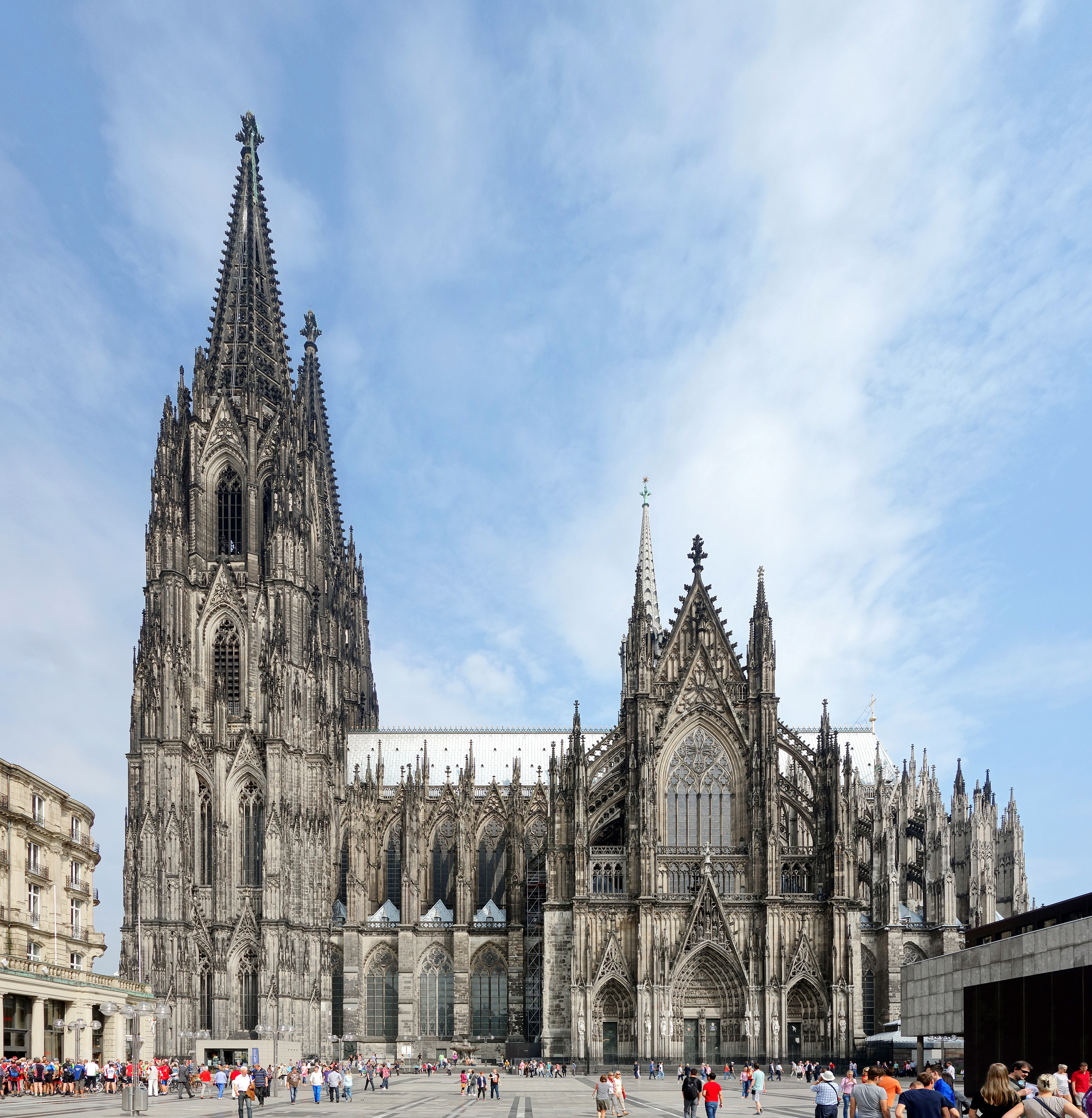
Cologne Cathedral in Germany.

=== Holy See–European Union relations ===
As the Vatican State is a theocracy, it cannot become a member of the European Union. However, traditionally there are very strong ties of the Holy See with the only neighboring country of the Vatican City, Italy and also with the European Union. Since 1970 the European Union accredits an official representative from the Holy See (an Apostolic Nuncio) to the EU. Even though the Vatican City is not an official member of the European Union, it has adopted the Euro as its currency and has open borders with the Schengen Area.

=== Statements of the Holy See and other dignitaries of the Catholic Church on the European integration ===
In 2016 Pope Francis was awarded with the Charlemagne prize. During his speech of thanks Pope Francis criticized a "crisis of solidarity" in Europe and condemned "national self-interest, renationalization and particularism".

In December 2018 Cardinal Reinhard Marx, archbishop of Munich and Freising and former president of COMECE, called for a deeper European integration and condemned the harmful consequences of nationalism.

=== The Council of the Bishops' Conferences of Europe (CCEE) ===
The Council of the Bishops' Conferences of Europe (Latin: Consilium Conferentiarum Episcoporum Europae) (CCEE) is a conference of the presidents of the 33 Roman Catholic episcopal conferences of Europe, the Archbishop of Luxembourg, the Archbishop of Monaco, Maronite Catholic Archeparch of Cyprus, the Roman Catholic Bishop of Chişinău, the Ruthenian Catholic Eparch of Mukacheve, and the Apostolic Administrator of Estonia. The CCEE Secretariat is located in St. Gallen, Switzerland.

=== The Commission of the Bishops' Conferences of the European Community (COMECE) ===
The Commission of the Bishops' Conferences of the European Community (Latin: Commissio Episcopatuum Communitatis Europaeae; COMECE) is the association of Catholic Church episcopal conferences in member states of the European Union (EU) which officially represents those episcopal conferences at EU institutions. COMECE bishops are delegated by Catholic episcopal conferences in EU member states and has a permanent Secretariat in Brussels, Belgium. It was established in 1980 and replaced the European Catholic Pastoral Information Service (SIPECA, 1976–1980). Discussions during the 1970s about creating an episcopal conferences' liaison organization to the European Community led to the decision, on the eve of the 1979 European Parliament election, to establish COMECE.

== Important European Catholic lay organizations ==
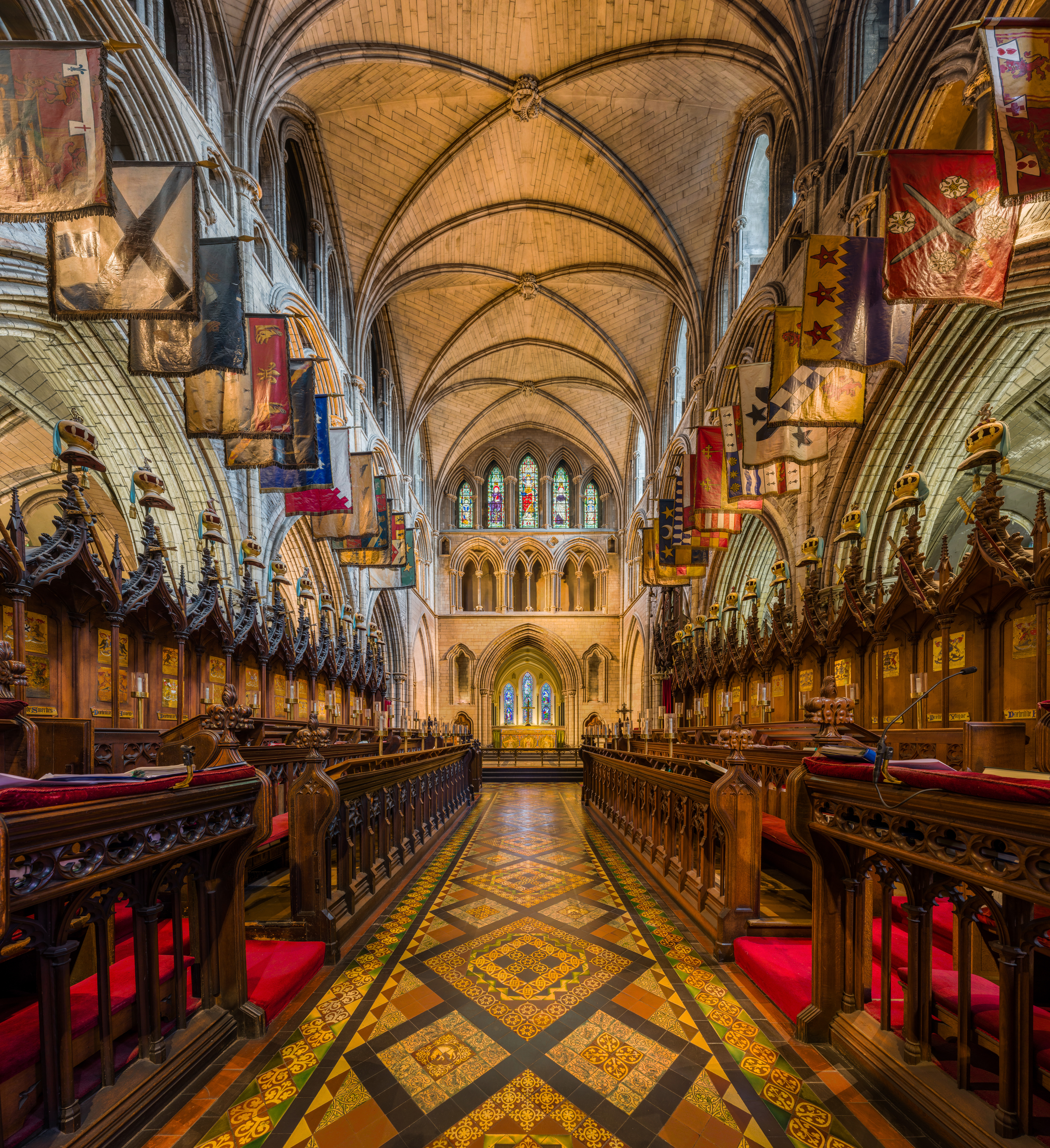
St Patrick's Cathedral in Dublin, Republic of Ireland.

=== European Catholic youth organizations ===
Fimcap Europe (International Federation of Catholic Parochial Youth Movements): Fimcap is an umbrella organization for catholic youth organizations, especially for youth organizations which are based at parish level. (See also: Fimcap Europe)

MIJARC Europe (International Movement of Catholic Agricultural and Rural Youth): MIJARC Europe is a platform representing the catholic, agricultural and rural youth movements in Europe.

=== Other important Catholic lay organizations ===
CIDSE (International Cooperation for Development and Solidarity): CIDSE is an umbrella organization for Catholic development agencies from Europe and North America.

World Movement of Christian Workers consists of Catholic workingmen and workingwomen.

== Important sites for the Catholic Church in Europe ==
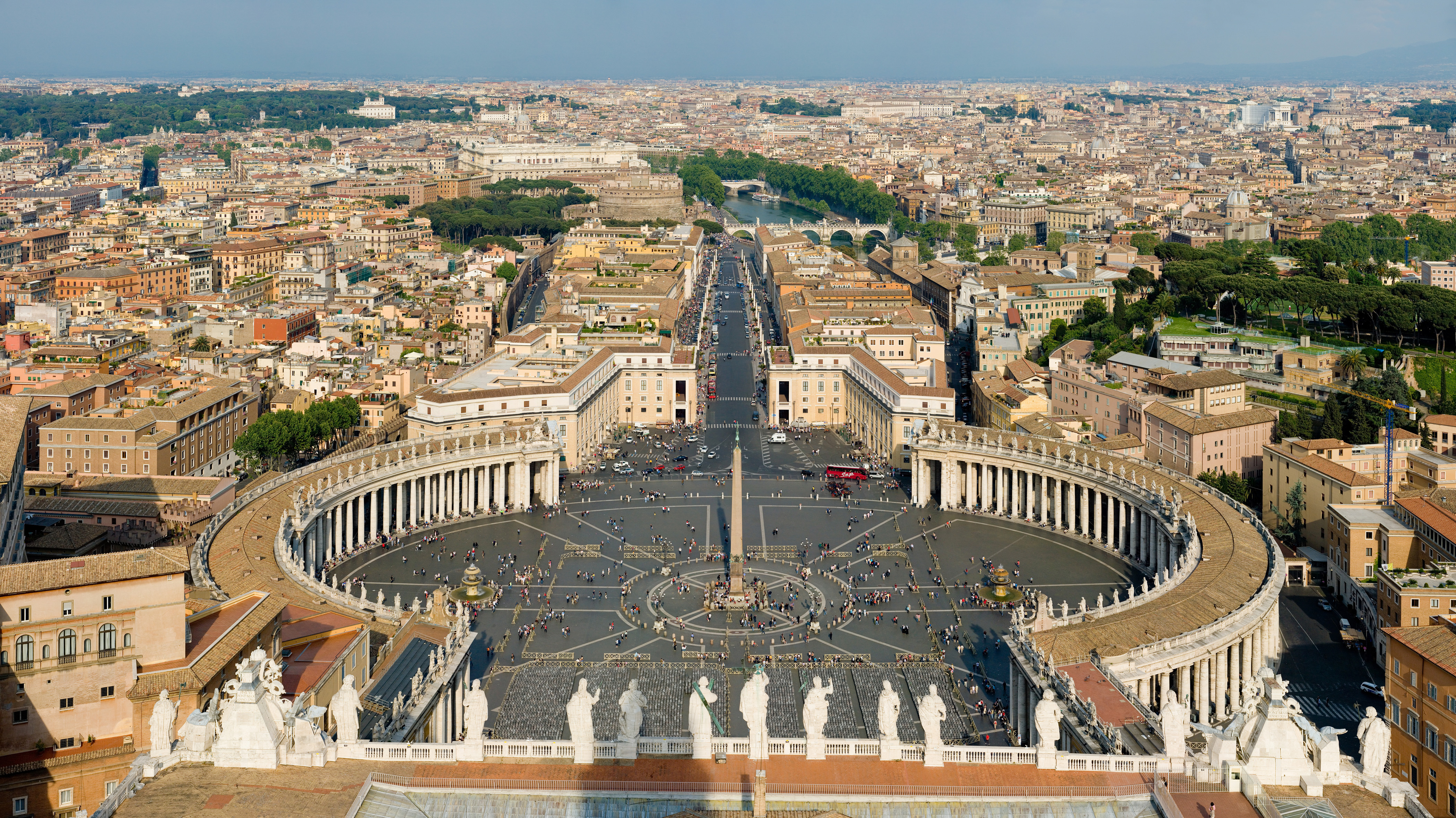
St. Peter's Square in Vatican City, Rome, Italy.

=== Vatican City and Rome ===
According to the Catholic tradition, Saint Peter, one of the Twelve Apostles of Jesus Christ and leader of the early church, was crucified and buried in Rome under Emperor Nero Augustus Caesar. On the place supposed to be the burial site of Saint Peter the Saint Peter's Basilica was built. Rome is also the residence city of the Pope, the leader of the Catholic Church, who at the same time is also the Bishop of Rome. Until today the Pope rules over an ecclesiastical state, the Vatican City, which encompasses 44 hectares of the city area. Rome hosts also the Papal Major basilicas. Besides the Saint Peter's Basilica there are three other Major basilicas: Archbasilica of Saint John Lateran, Basilica of Saint Paul Outside the Walls and Basilica di Santa Maria Maggiore.

=== Santiago de Compostela ===
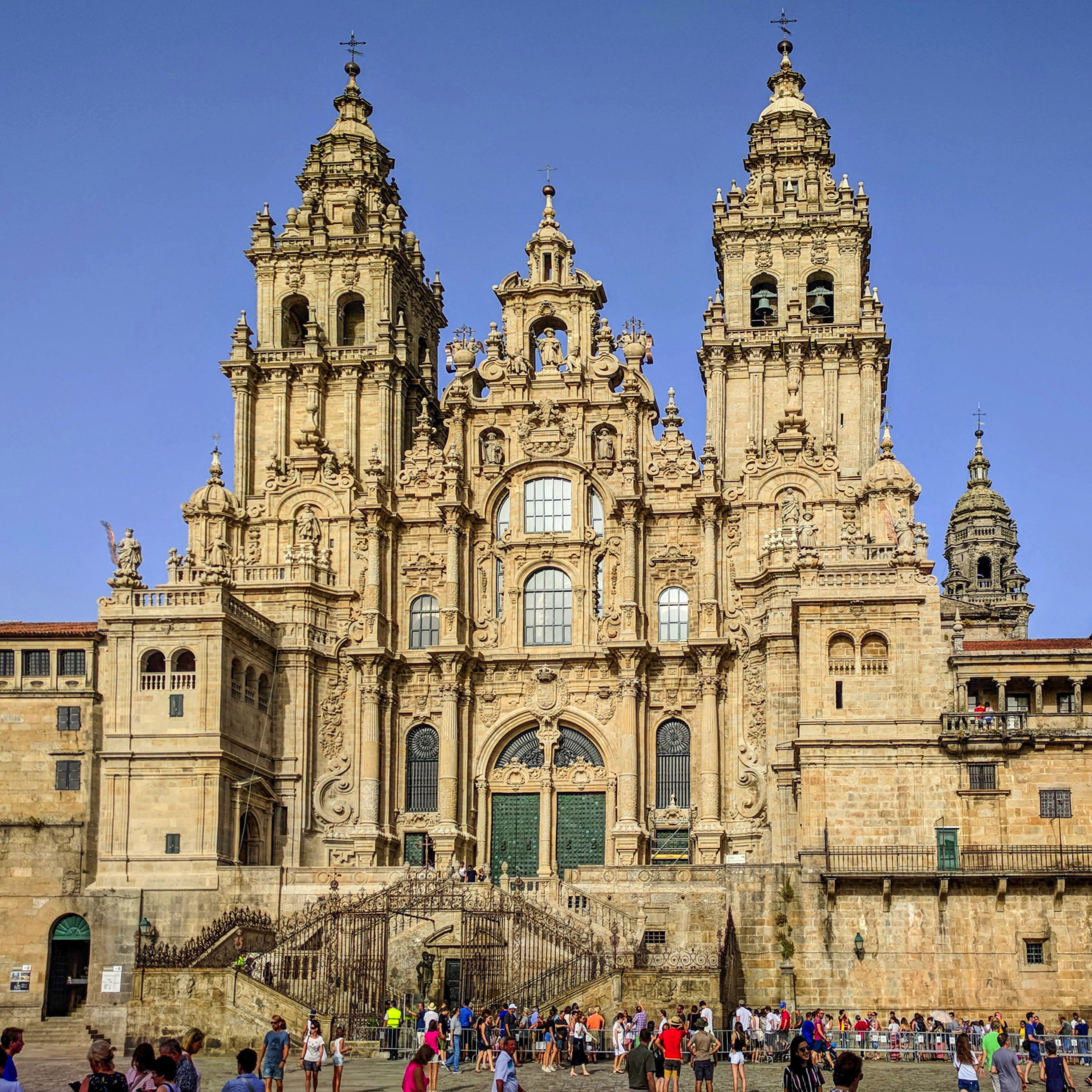
Santiago de Compostela Cathedral in Spain.

One of the most important and famous sites for pilgrimages for the Catholic Church is Santiago de Compostela in Galicia, Spain. The cathedral of the city hosts the shrine of Saint James, one of the Twelve Apostles of Jesus, and traditionally considered the first apostle to be martyred. Santiago de Compostela is the final destination of the Way of Saint James (Galician: O Camiño de Santiago).

=== Assisi ===
Assisi, a town in the Umbria region in Italy, hosts two more papal basilicas: the Basilica of San Francesco d'Assisi and the Basilica of Santa Maria degli Angeli. The Basilica of San Francesco d'Assisi is the mother church of the Order of Friars Minor, commonly known as the "Franciscan Order". Assisi is the town in which the founder of the order, Saint Francis of Assisi, was born and died.

== See also ==
- Catholic Church by country
- Catholic Church in Africa
- Catholic Church in Asia
- Catholic Church in North America
- Catholic Church in Latin America
- Catholic Church in Oceania
- List of Catholic dioceses in Europe
