= WikiWoods =

Volunteer tree-planting group

- Founded: 2007 (19 years ago)
- Type: NGO
- Purpose: Tree planting; Environmentalism
- Location: Berlin, Germany
- Official language: German
- Volunteers: 3400 (to October 2016)
- Award: Theodor Heuss medal
- Website: wikiwoods.org

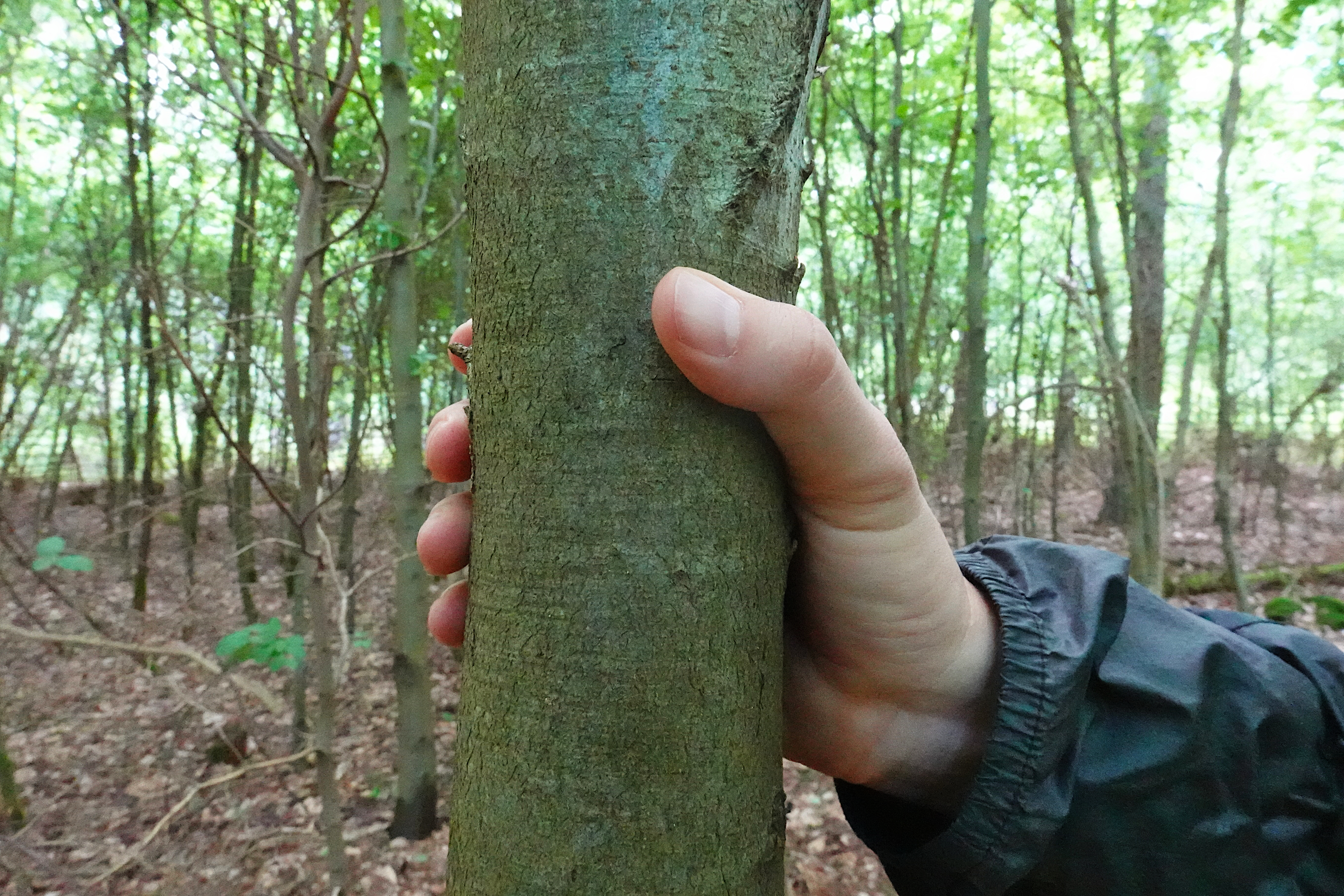
WikiWoods planting from 7 November 2009 at NSG Biesenthaler Becken, Brandenburg, Germany, now nearly 15 years old when photographed

WikiWoods is a group of volunteers who plant trees with the joint aims of preventing climate change and inspiring people to be environmentally aware. Founded in 2007, around 3,400 volunteers have planted 163,100 trees to October 2016. The group is based around a wiki, which enables people to register their own tree planting events, to find like-minded friends in their region, and to network with foresters and other tree experts. As of 2016, events have taken place in Berlin, Brandenburg, Göttingen, and Mecklenburg-Vorpommern in Germany as well as in Hîrbovăț in Moldova. It is hoped that the idea will spread, with further volunteers getting involved in organising tree planting events using the WikiWoods software as a coordinating platform.

WikiWoods plants according to a set of sustainability guidelines that were specially developed for the group. The events that have been carried out so far include afforestation, the conversion of monoculture coniferous forests into mixed woodland, the planting of hedges and forest edges, as well as the planting, harvesting, and pruning of fruit trees.

In order to ensure the future protection of the trees that are planted, WikiWoods works with environmental partners who provide the land and take responsibility for their ongoing care. Partner organizations include WWF, BUND, NABU National Heritage Foundation (NABU-Stiftung Nationales Naturerbe), and the Lower Oder Valley National Park.

WikiWoods is supported by sponsor organization Active Commons e.V., which provides funds for planting projects and the operation of the Internet platform. WikiWoods is a member of the Climate-Alliance Germany.

== Activities ==
Tree growth

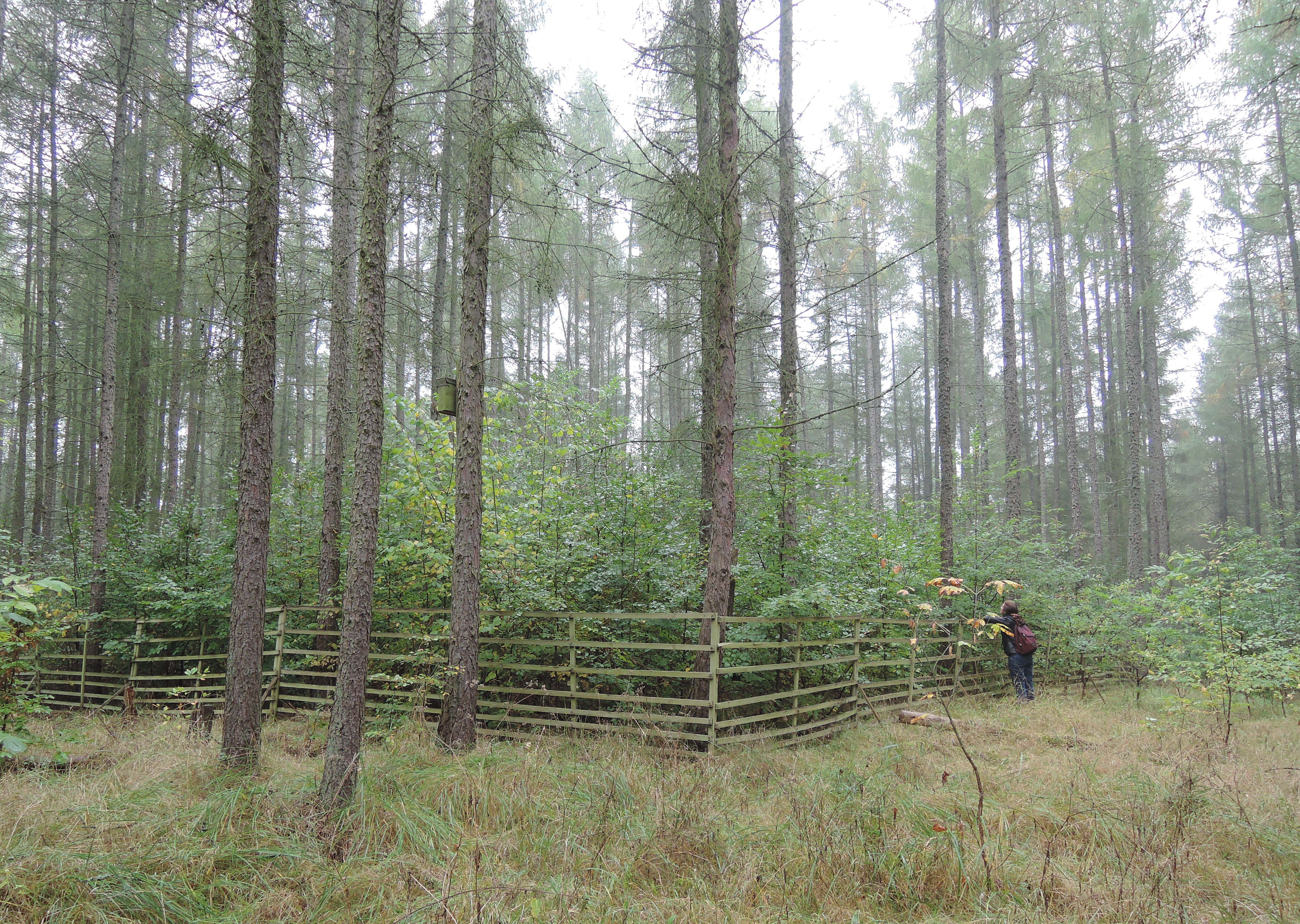
After 7 years

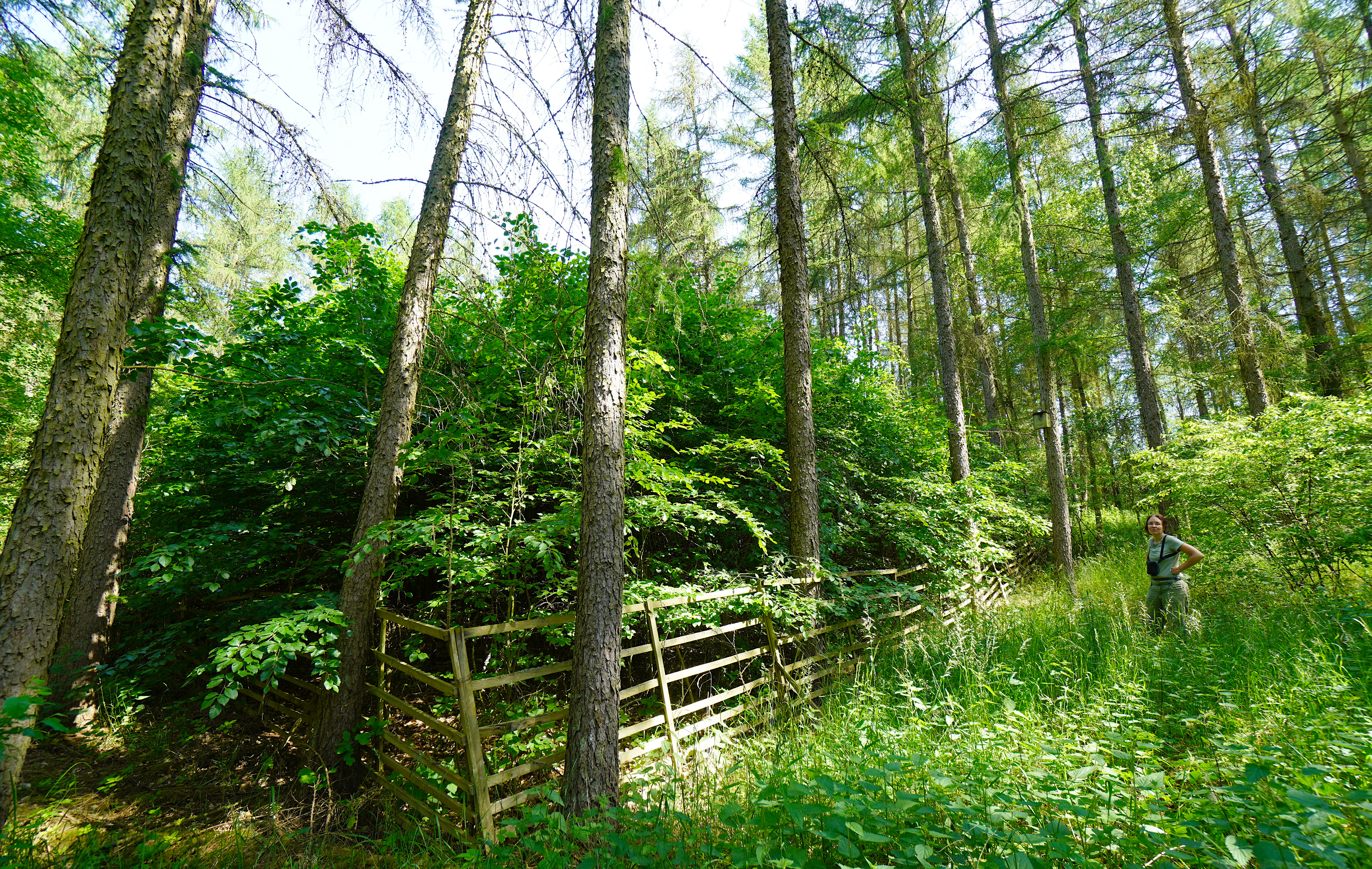
After 12 years

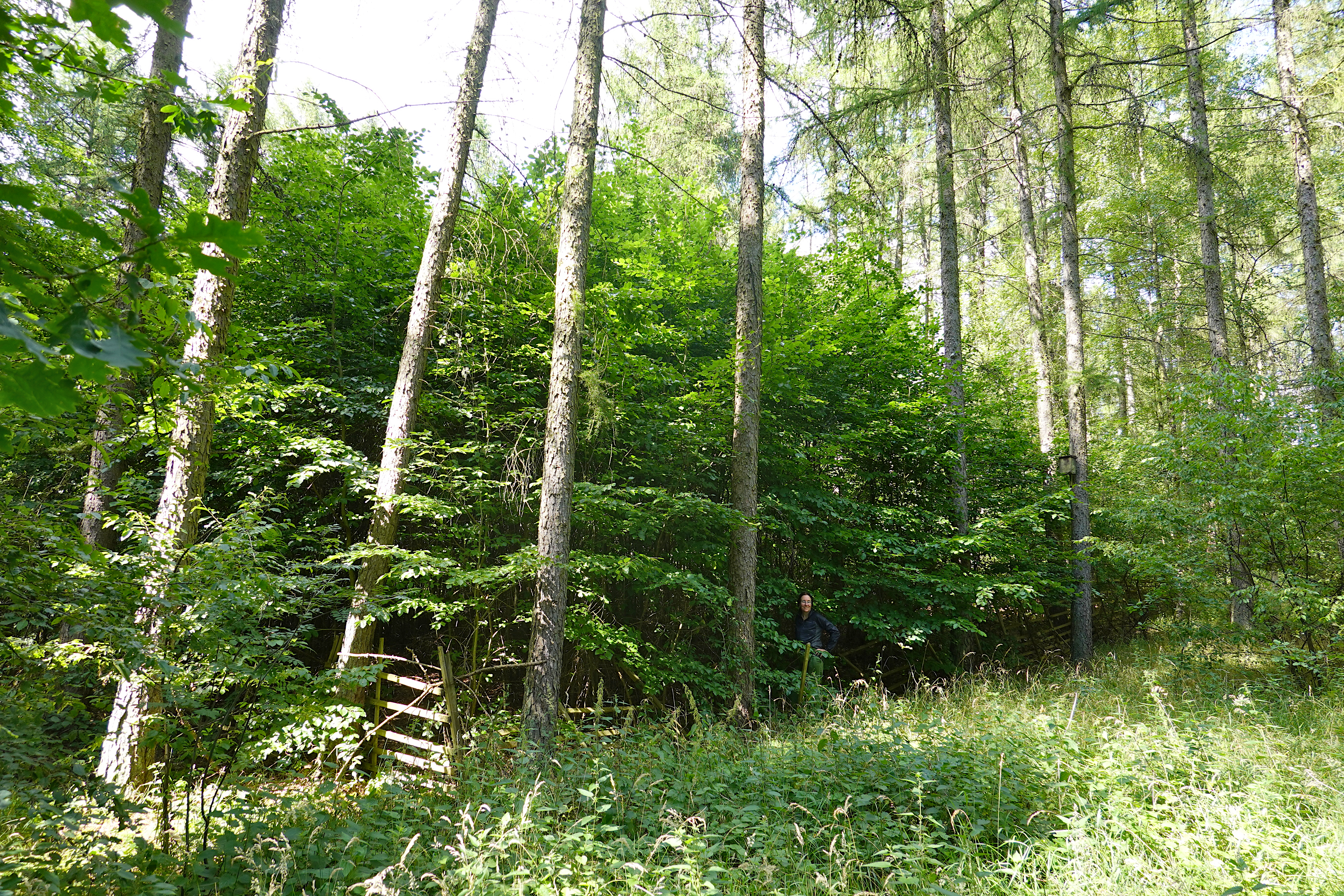
After 15 years

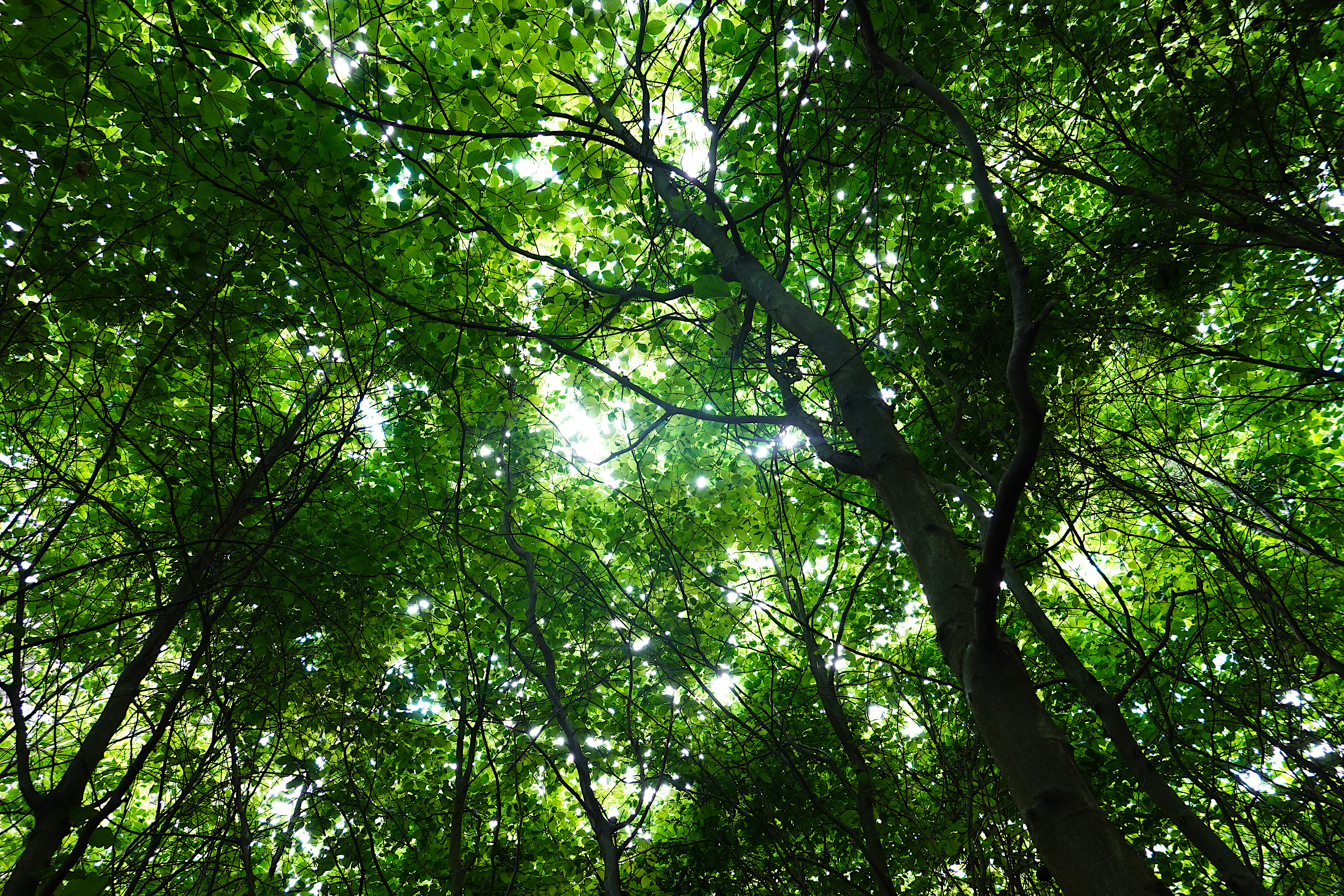
After 15 years looking up

Photographs from the same planting in November 2009 at NSG Biesenthaler Becken, Brandenburg, Germany. The fenced areas depicted differ slightly by location. The same person in each photo provides scale.

In 2009, WikiWoods started a new area of activity, namely the planting of fruit trees. In May 2009, the mayor of the Berlin district of Kreuzberg, Franz Schulz, and member of the German Parliament Hans-Christian Ströbele (Green Party) helped WikiWoods plant 10 fruit trees at Yaam am Ostbahnhof, Berlin.

2010 saw WikiWoods campaigning against the controversial carbon capture and storage (CCS) pilot projects planned for Beeskow, Neutrebbin, and Letschin. The 'Trees instead of CO_{2} store' (Baüme statt CO_{2}-Lager) campaign was attended by politicians including Dagmar Enkelmann (Die Linke) and Hans-Georg von der Marwitz (CDU/CSU).

In 2011, several WikiWoods projects were undertaken through the Youth in Action program, funded by the European Union.

WikiWoods reacted to the devastating sandstorm of 9 April 2011 in the German federal state of Mecklenburg-West Pomerania by planting wind protection hedges. These newly planted hedges should help to alleviate soil erosion in the future.

== Awards ==
WikiWoods has been awarded several prizes. In 2008, it won the 'Environmental Award People and Nature' (Umweltpreis Mensch und Natur) from broadcaster ZDF and the German Federal Environmental Foundation (BDU). The organization competed under the section 'Ideas and Innovation'. On 9 April 2011, WikiWoods received the Theodor Heuss medal from the Theodor Heuss Foundation (Theodor Heuss Stiftung). This prize is awarded for exemplary democratic disposition and the focus in 2011 was the environment.

== See also ==
- Forest restoration
- Reforestation
- Team Trees
- Tree planting
