= Michael Horlacher =

German politician

Michael Horlacher (18 January 1888 in Pottenstein – 12 October 1957 in Bad Tölz) was a German politician and member of the Bavarian People's Party and later Christian Social Union in Bavaria. After Second World War and the establishment of West Germany, he served as president of the Landtag of Bavaria.

== Biography ==
Horlacher studied law and political science at the Ludwig-Maximilians-Universität München and became a member of the Cartellverband. On October 1914, he entered during the First World War as a volunteer in the 6th field artillery regiment "Prince Ferdinand of Bourbon, Duke of Calabria" of the Bavarian Army in Fürth, but was released in early December due to incapacity.

He then worked until spring 1917 as an employee in the Bavarian State Statistical Office or at the Bavarian food office under it. From 1917 to 1918, he was the economics editor at the Munich-Augsburg evening newspaper. In 1919, he was managing director of the Association of Agricultural Associations and the Agricultural Industry in Bavaria and – alongside Karl Mayr, Karl Graf von Bothmer, Gottfried Feder, Joseph Hofmiller and others – was a speaker at political propaganda courses in cooperation with the Reichswehr and the Bavarian office of the Reich Agency for Homeland Service were carried out at the Ludwig-Maximilians-Universität München. From 1920 to 1933, he acted as director of the newly created Bavarian Chamber of Farmers (Chamber of Agriculture for Bavaria). After the Nazis seized power, Horlacher was retired in 1933 for political reasons. He was arrested in 1933 and 1944, and spent the last months of the war in the Dachau concentration camp.

=== Postwar ===
After the war, he was director of the Bavarian Raiffeisen Association and State Commissioner for Agricultural Cooperatives, and in 1945 participated in the re-establishment of the Bavarian Farmers' Association. His son Hellmut Horlacher succeeded him as President of the Bavarian Raiffeisen Association.

From 1946 to 1950, he was again a member of the Bavarian Parliament, until the resignation of his mandate on 8 February 1950 due to his election to the German Bundestag, he was also President of the Parliament. From 1947 to 1949, he was a member of the State Council of the American Occupation Territory (German: Länderrat des amerikanischen Besatzungsgebietes) He was a member of the German Bundestag in the first two legislative periods (1949–1957) and represented the constituency of Forchheim in parliament. In 1952, he belonged to the group of Bavarian MPs who unsuccessfully applied to amend Article 102 of the Basic Law (the German constitution) with the aim of reintroducing the death penalty for certain offenses. From 1956 to 1957, he was the deputy chairman of the parliamentary committee of inquiry to examine processes in the import and supply center for fats.

His saying became a trademark of his coarse peasant rhetoric: "As an individual, the woman looks like a flower in parliament, but in the masses like weeds".
