= Bund der Deutschen Katholischen Jugend =

German youth organization

- Abbreviation: BDKJ
- Formation: 1947; 79 years ago
- Purpose: Umbrella organization of German Catholic youth organizations
- Headquarters: Düsseldorf, Germany
- Members: 660,000 members
- Presidents: Volker Andres, Lena Bloemacher, Henner Gädtke, Daniela Hottenbacher
- Website: www.bdkj.de

The Bund der Deutschen Katholischen Jugend (BDKJ) is the umbrella of Catholic youth organizations in Germany.

== Member organizations ==
- Aktion West-Ost
- Bund der St. Sebastianus Schützenjugend (BdSJ)
- Christliche Arbeiterjugend (CAJ)
- DJK-Sportjugend (youth organization of DJK-Sportverband)
- Deutsche Pfadfinderschaft Sankt Georg (DPSG)
- Jugendverbände der Gemeinschaft Christlichen Lebens (J-GCL)
- Katholische junge Gemeinde (KjG)
- Katholische Landjugendbewegung (KLJB)
- Kolpingjugend
- Katholische Studierende Jugend (KSJ)
- Pfadfinderinnenschaft Sankt Georg (PSG)
- Quickborn Arbeitskreis
- Unitas-Verband
