= Dasnice =

- Municipality
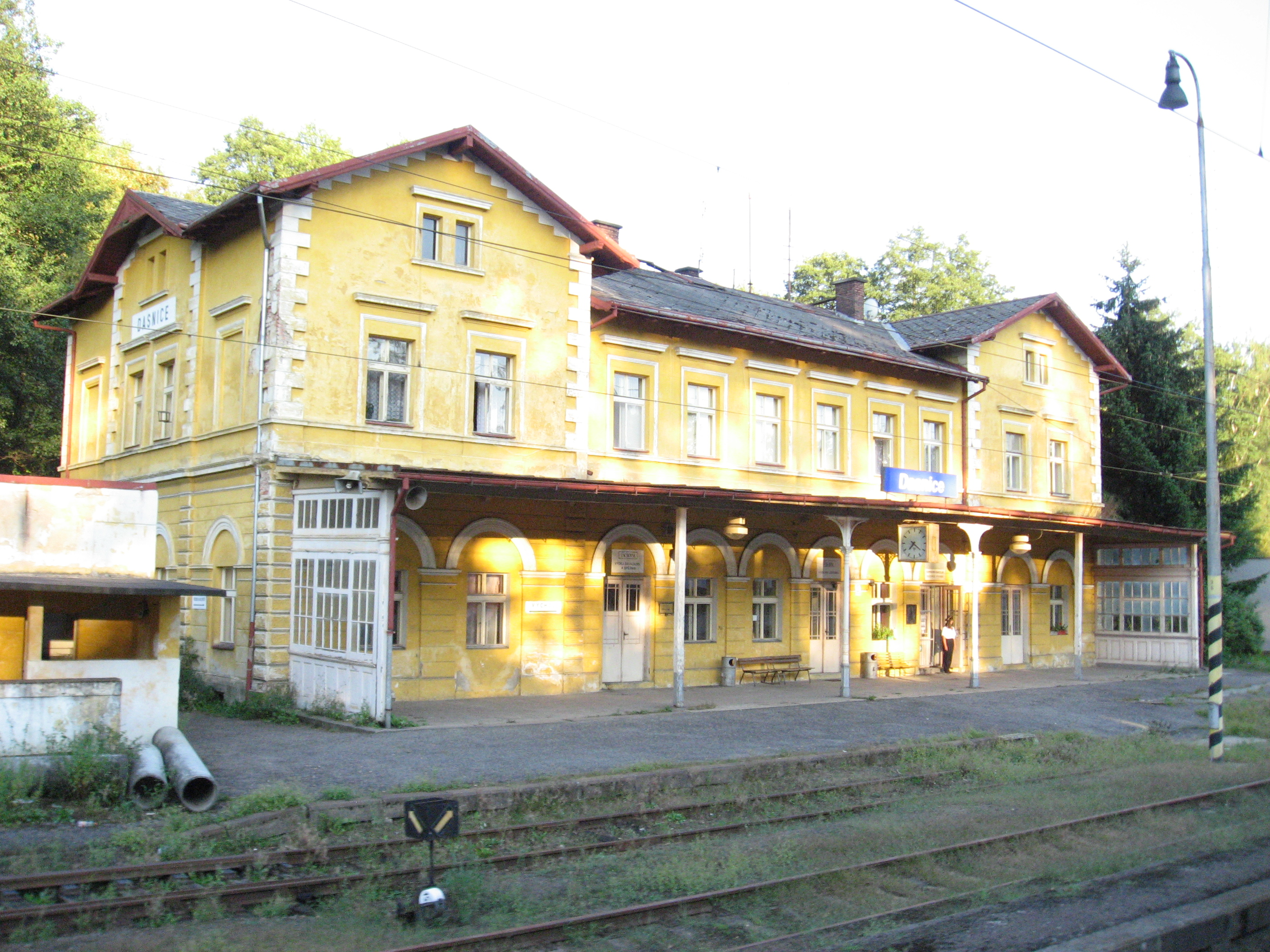
- Railway station

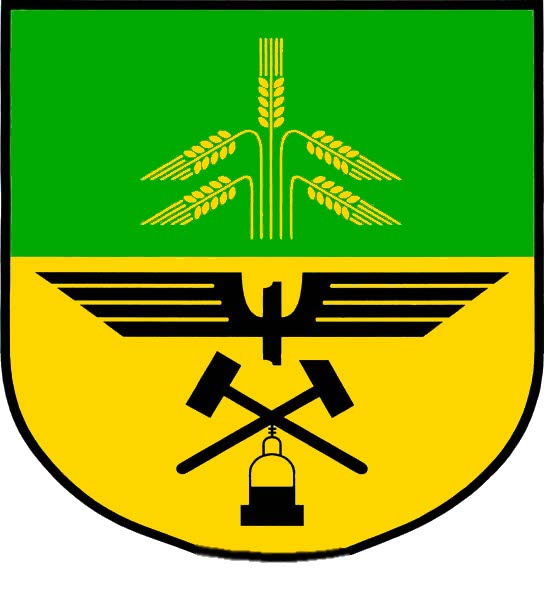
- Flag Coat of arms

- Location in the Czech Republic
- Coordinates: 50°8′48″N 12°34′2″E
- Country: Czech Republic
- Region: Karlovy Vary
- District: Sokolov
- First mentioned: 1370

Area
  - Total: 4.04 km^{2} (1.56 sq mi)
- Elevation: 442 m (1,450 ft)

Population (2026-01-01)
  - Total: 249
  - Density: 61.6/km^{2} (160/sq mi)
- Time zone: UTC+1 (CET)
  - Summer (DST): UTC+2 (CEST)
- Postal code: 357 09
- Website: www.dasnice.eu

Dasnice (German: Daßnitz) is a municipality and village in Sokolov District in the Karlovy Vary Region of the Czech Republic. It has about 200 inhabitants.

== Demographics ==
Historical population
Year	Pop.	±%
1869	309	—
1880	273	−11.7%
1890	312	+14.3%
1900	396	+26.9%
1910	437	+10.4%
1921	442	+1.1%
1930	473	+7.0%
1950	257	−45.7%
1961	493	+91.8%
1970	493	+0.0%
1980	357	−27.6%
1991	330	−7.6%
2001	353	+7.0%
2011	318	−9.9%
2021	255	−19.8%
Source: Censuses

== Notable people ==
- Johann Böhm (born 1937), German politician
