= Mut (political party) =

German political party

Courage Mut
- Founders: Claudia Stamm; Stephan Lessenich
- Founded: 1 June 2017
- Dissolved: 9 April 2026
- Split from: Alliance 90/The Greens
- Headquarters: Munich
- Ideology: Ecologism; Social liberalism
- Political position: Centre-left
- European political alliance: DiEM25

Website
- www.partei-mut.de

Mut (lit. 'Courage') was a German political party founded in June 2017 by Claudia Stamm and Stephan Lessenich.

== History ==
Since 2009, Stamm has been associated with the Greens as a Member of Parliament. She resigned in March 2017 and formed Mut on 1 June 2017 with Lessenich and others. Apart from Stamm and Lessenich, the board members included Nicole Britz and Alex Schweiger, the treasurer. Britz is the former Chairman of the Pirate Party of Bavaria.

Other known members of the party were Renate Ackermann and Matthias Matuschik.

It was the youngest political party to participate in the Bavarian state elections of 2018. Initially, the party had problems finding eligible candidates to contest in the election but they fulfilled the requirement. Among 44 out of 91 constituencies, Mut party had direct candidates.

In January 2026, the party announced on its website that it would dissolve in accordance with the decision of a special party congress in August 2025 and the result of a subsequent ballot.
