= Lower Bavaria =

Administrative region of Bavaria, Germany

Lower Bavaria Niederbayern (German) Niedabayern (Bavarian)
- Regierungsbezirk
- Flag Coat of arms

- Map of Bavaria highlighting Lower Bavaria
- Coordinates: 48°32′15″N 12°09′24″E
- Country: Germany
- State: Bavaria
- Region seat: Landshut

Government
  - District President: Olaf Heinrich (CSU)

Area
  - Total: 10,329.87 km^{2} (3,988.39 sq mi)

Population (31 December 2025)
  - Total: 1,260,007
  - Density: 121.9770/km^{2} (315.9191/sq mi)

GDP
  - Total: €63.132 billion (2024)
  - Per capita: €50,145 (2024)
- Website: regierung.niederbayern.bayern.de

Lower Bavaria (German: Niederbayern, pronounced [ˈniːdɐˌbaɪɐn]; Bavarian: Niedabayern, Niadabayern, Niedabayan or Niadabayan) is one of the seven administrative regions of Bavaria, Germany, located in the east of the state. It consists of nine districts and 258 municipalities (including three cities).

== Geography ==
Lower Bavaria is subdivided into two regions (Planungsverband) – Landshut and Donau-Wald. Recent election results mark it as the most conservative part of Germany, generally giving huge margins to the CSU. This part of Bavaria includes the Bavarian Forest, a well-known tourist destination in Germany, and the Lower Bavarian Upland.

Landkreise
(districts)

1. Deggendorf
2. Dingolfing-Landau
3. Freyung-Grafenau
4. Kelheim
5. Landshut
6. Passau
7. Regen
8. Rottal-Inn
9. Straubing-Bogen

Kreisfreie Städte
(district-free towns)

1. Landshut
2. Passau
3. Straubing

== Population ==
Historical population

Year	Pop.	±% p.a.
1900	678,192	—
1910	724,331	+0.66%
1939	755,980	+0.15%
1950	1,041,333	+2.95%
1960	927,399	−1.15%
1970	977,166	+0.52%
1980	998,192	+0.21%

Year	Pop.	±% p.a.
1990	1,078,110	+0.77%
2000	1,176,206	+0.87%
2005	1,196,923	+0.35%
2010	1,189,701	−0.12%
2015	1,212,119	+0.37%
2019	1,244,169	+0.65%

== Economy ==
The gross domestic product (GDP) of the region was €48.5 billion in 2018, accounting for 1.4% of German economic output. GDP per capita adjusted for purchasing power was €36,100 or 120% of the EU27 average in the same year. The GDP per employee was 100% of the EU average.

== Main sights ==
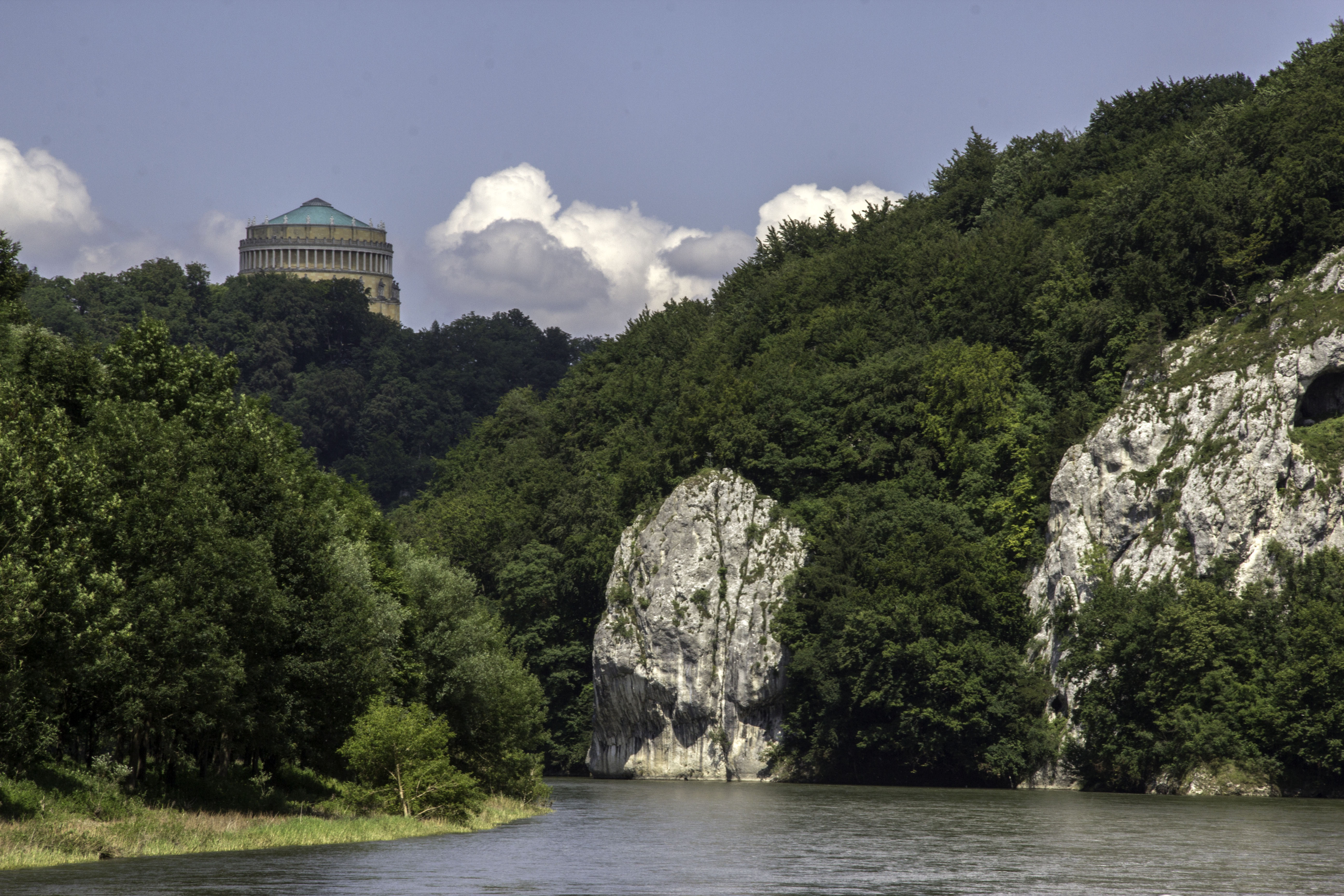
Befreiungshalle in Kelheim with River Danube

Next to the former ducal residences Landshut and Straubing and the baroque episcopal city of Passau, the city of Kelheim with the Befreiungshalle and Weltenburg Abbey belong to the major tourist attractions. To the scenic attractions belong the River Danube including the Donaudurchbruch at Weltenburg and the Bavarian Forest with Mount Großer Arber.

== History ==
The Duchy of Lower Bavaria was created for the first time with the First Bavarian Partition in 1255 under Duke Henry, though the Duchy was not identical in extent to the current territory. After the reunification in 1340, Bavaria was divided again in 1349. In 1353 Bavaria-Straubing and Bavaria-Landshut were created in Lower Bavaria. In 1505 Bavaria was permanently reunited. For administrative purposes, Bavaria was split into Rentämter (plural of Rentamt). Lower Bavaria consisted of the Rentamt Landshut and Rentamt Straubing.

Control of Lower Bavaria was one of the issues involved in the War of the Bavarian Succession in 1778-9.

After the founding of the Kingdom of Bavaria following the dissolution of the Holy Roman Empire in 1805, the state was totally reorganized. In 1808 it was divided into 15 administrative districts (German: Regierungsbezirke, singular Regierungsbezirk), in Bavaria called Kreise (singular Kreis). They were created in the same fashion as the French departements, being fairly similar to each other in size and population, and named after their main rivers. In the following years, territorial changes (such as the loss of Tyrol [to Italy and Austria] and the addition of the Palatinate) reduced the number of districts to eight. One of these was the Unterdonaukreis (Lower Danube District). In 1837, King Ludwig I of Bavaria renamed the Kreise after historical territorial names and tribes. This also involved border changes and territorial exchanges. Thus the Unterdonaukreis became Lower Bavaria. The district capital was moved from Passau to Landshut which was added from Isarkreis.

Lower Bavaria and Upper Palatinate were consolidated in 1932 into one administrative district. In 1954 the two separate districts were restored. In 1972 Lower Bavaria was reshaped when the rural districts it included were also reshaped.
