= Alois Glück =

German politician (1940–2024)

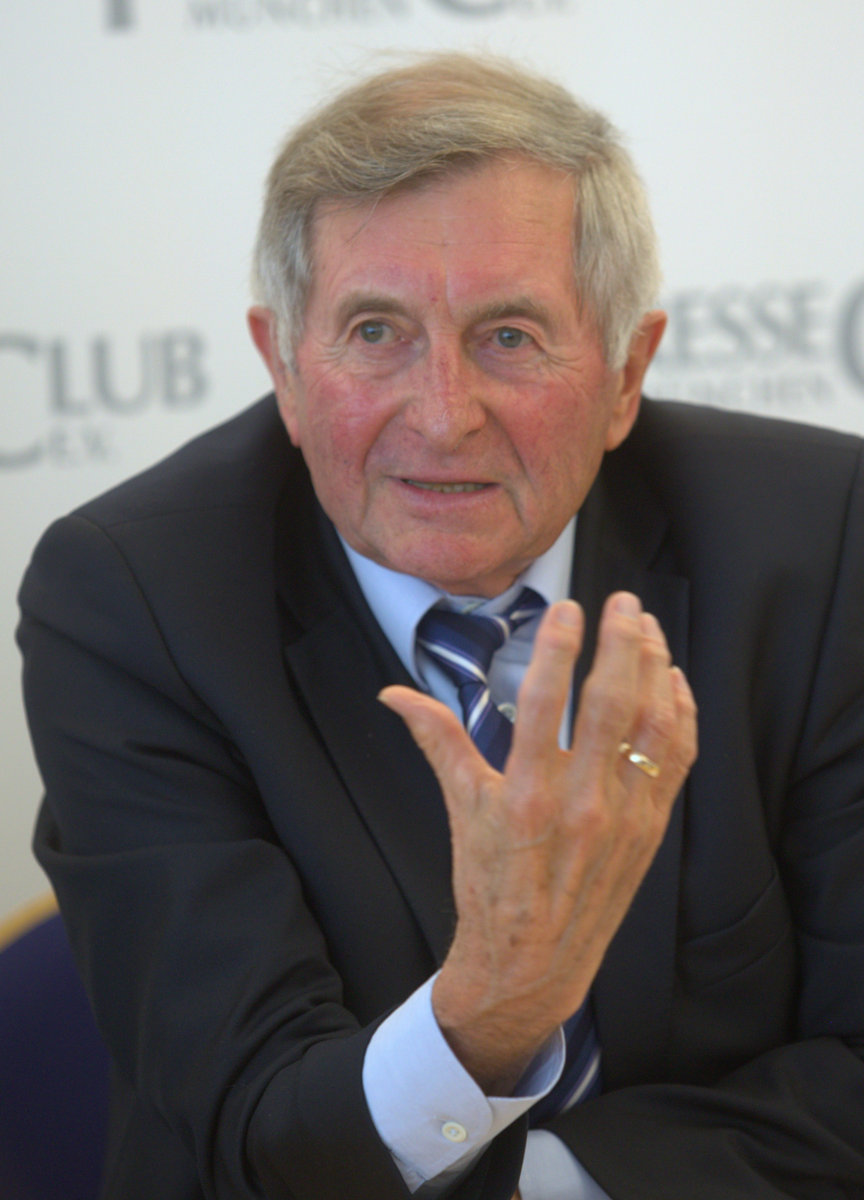
Glück in 2017

Alois Glück (German pronunciation: [ˈaːlɔʏs ˈɡlʏk]) (24 January 1940 – 26 February 2024) was a German politician of the CSU in Bavaria.

== Life and career ==
Glück was born in Hörzing in the district of Traunstein. He started his political engagement in the Catholic Rural Youth Movement of Germany . After a journalistic career the skilled agriculturist was elected for the CSU in the Landtag of Bavaria in 1970. In 1986 Franz Josef Strauß appointed him as a permanent secretary in the Bavarian State Ministry for State Development and Environmental Questions, since 1988 he led the CSU Landtag fraction and from 1994 to 2007 the CSU district association Upper Bavaria. In 2003 he was selected to the Landtagspräsident (President of the Landtag).

From July 1999 Glück was additionally the chairman of the CSU principle commission. As such he significantly contributed to the development of strategic CSU position documents like "Aktive Bürgergesellschaft" (Active Commoners Society) and "Soziale Marktwirtschaft für das 21. Jahrhundert" (Social Market Economy for the 21st Century).

Apart from his political career Glück accepted many honorary posts. From 1983 he was a member of the Zentralkomitee der deutschen Katholiken (Central Committee of German Catholics – and its president since 2009), the chairman of the Bergwacht Bayern (Mountain rescue Bavaria), of the charity association Caritas Children's Village Irschenberg.

Glück died on 26 February 2024, at the age of 84.

== Other activities ==
- Freundeskreis Abtei Frauenwörth, Chairman of the Circle of Friends
- Hanns Seidel Foundation, Vice Chairman
- ProChrist, Member of the Board of Trustees
- Freya von Moltke Foundation, Member of the Board of Trustees
- German Council for Sustainable Development (RNE), Member (2011-2016, appointed ad personam by Chancellor Angela Merkel)

Preceded by Johann Böhm	Presidents of the Landtag of Bavaria; 2003–2008	Succeeded by Barbara Stamm
