= Upper Bavaria =

Coordinates: 48°08′N 11°34′E

Upper Bavaria Oberbayern (German)
- Regierungsbezirk
- Flag Coat of arms

- Map of Bavaria highlighting Upper Bavaria
- Country: Germany
- State: Bavaria
- Region seat: Munich

Government
  - District President: Thomas Schwarzenberger (CSU)

Area
  - Total: 17,529.41 km^{2} (6,768.14 sq mi)

Population (31 December 2025)
  - Total: 4,767,226
  - Density: 271.9559/km^{2} (704.3625/sq mi)

GDP
  - Total: €359.141 billion (2024)
  - Per capita: €75,386 (2024)
- Website: regierung.oberbayern.bayern.de

Upper Bavaria (German: Oberbayern, pronounced [ˈoːbɐˌbaɪ̯ɐn]; Bavarian: Oberbayern) is one of the seven administrative regions of Bavaria, Germany.

== Geography ==
Upper Bavaria is located in the southern portion of Bavaria, and is centred on the city of Munich, both state capital and seat of the district government. Because of this, it is by far the most populous administrative division in Bavaria. It is subdivided into four planning regions (Planungsverband): Ingolstadt, Munich, Bayerisches Oberland (Bavarian Highland), and Südostoberbayern (South East Upper Bavaria). The name 'Upper Bavaria' refers to the relative position on the Danube and its tributaries: downstream, Upper Bavaria is followed by Lower Bavaria, then Upper Austria, and subsequently Lower Austria. It consists of 20 districts and 500 municipalities (including three cities).

Landkreise (districts):

- Altötting
- Bad Tölz-Wolfratshausen
- Berchtesgadener Land
- Dachau
- Ebersberg
- Eichstätt
- Erding
- Freising
- Fürstenfeldbruck
- Garmisch-Partenkirchen
- Landsberg
- Miesbach
- Mühldorf
- Munich (München)
- Neuburg-Schrobenhausen
- Pfaffenhofen
- Rosenheim
- Starnberg
- Traunstein
- Weilheim-Schongau

Kreisfreie Städte (district-free cities):

- Ingolstadt
- Munich (München)
- Rosenheim

== Population ==
Historical population of Upper Bavaria:

Year	Inhabitants
1840	711,861
1871	865,178
1900	1,351,086
1925	1,727,483
1939	1,999,048
1950	2,541,896
1960	2,844,910
1970	3,372,700
1980	3,657,776
1990	3,801,448
2000	4,083,077
2010	4,373,588
2015	4,588,944
2019	4,710,865

== Economy ==
The gross domestic product (GDP) of the region was €273.7 billion in 2018, accounting for 8.2% of German economic output. GDP per capita adjusted for purchasing power was €53,900 or 179% of the EU27 average in the same year. The GDP per employee was 134% of the EU average. This makes Upper Bavaria one of the richest regions in Europe.

The region is served by Munich Airport which is also Germany's second-busiest airport after Frankfurt Airport and the eleventh busiest in Europe, handling 41.6 million passengers in 2024. The airport had been ranked as the 39th-busiest airport worldwide that year.

== History ==
The duchy of Upper Bavaria was created for the first time with the First Bavarian partition in 1255 under duke Louis II, but there was no exact correlation between this duchy and the current territory. After the reunification in 1340 Bavaria was divided again in 1349, and in 1392 the duchies Bavaria-Munich and Bavaria-Ingolstadt were created in Upper Bavaria. In 1505 Bavaria was permanently reunited. For administrative purposes, Bavaria was split into Rentämter (plural of Rentamt). Upper Bavaria consisted of the Rentamt Munich and Rentamt Burghausen.

After the founding of the Kingdom of Bavaria the state was totally reorganised and, in 1808, divided into 15 administrative districts (Regierungsbezirke (singular Regierungsbezirk)), in Bavaria called (Kreise (singular Kreis)). They were created in the fashion of the French departements, quite even in size and population, and named after their main rivers. In the following years, due to territorial changes (e.g. loss of Tyrol, addition of the Palatinate), the number of districts was reduced to 8. One of these was the Isarkreis (Isar District). In 1837 king Ludwig I of Bavaria renamed the Kreise after historical names, and tribes. This also involved border changes or territorial swaps. Thus, the Isarkreis changed to Upper Bavaria.

Instead of a Rentamt-style mere administrational unit, the newly created districts became predecessors of modern regional self-government, building a political and administrational link inbetween the Bavarian state as a whole and the local authorities.

== Main sights ==
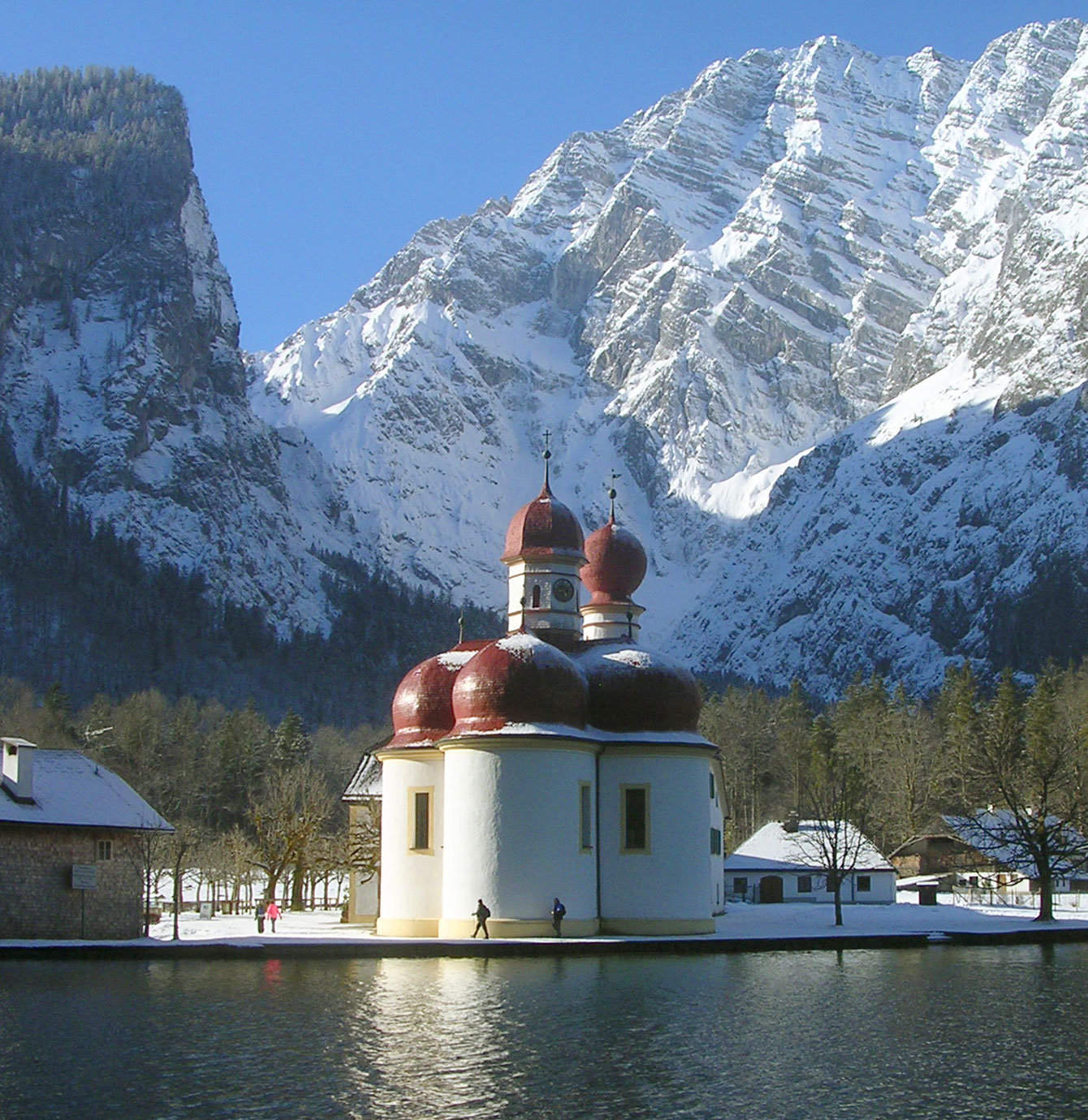
Watzmann East Face, rising behind St. Batholomew's Church at lake Königssee

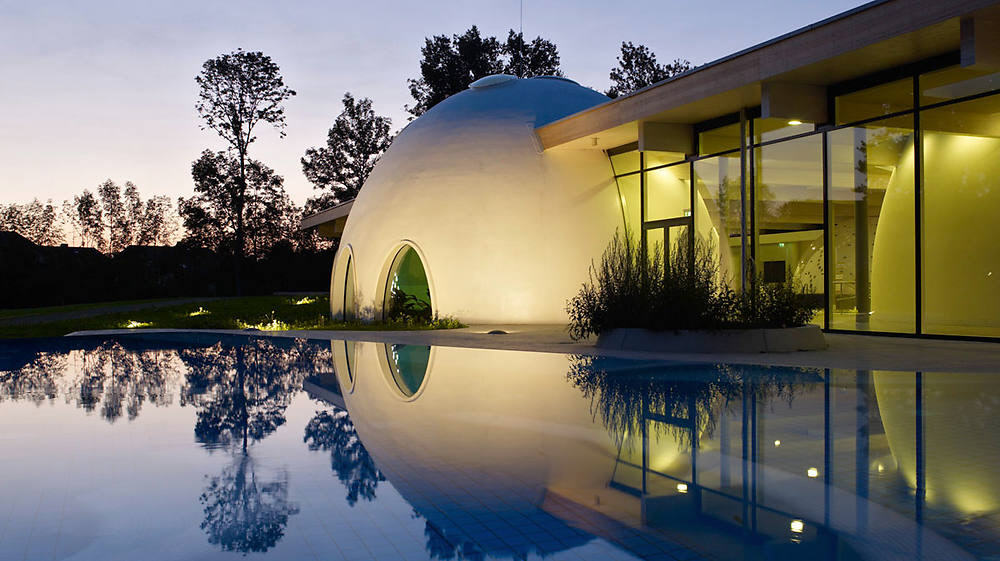
The thermal baths in Bad Aibling with its special architecture in the form of domes

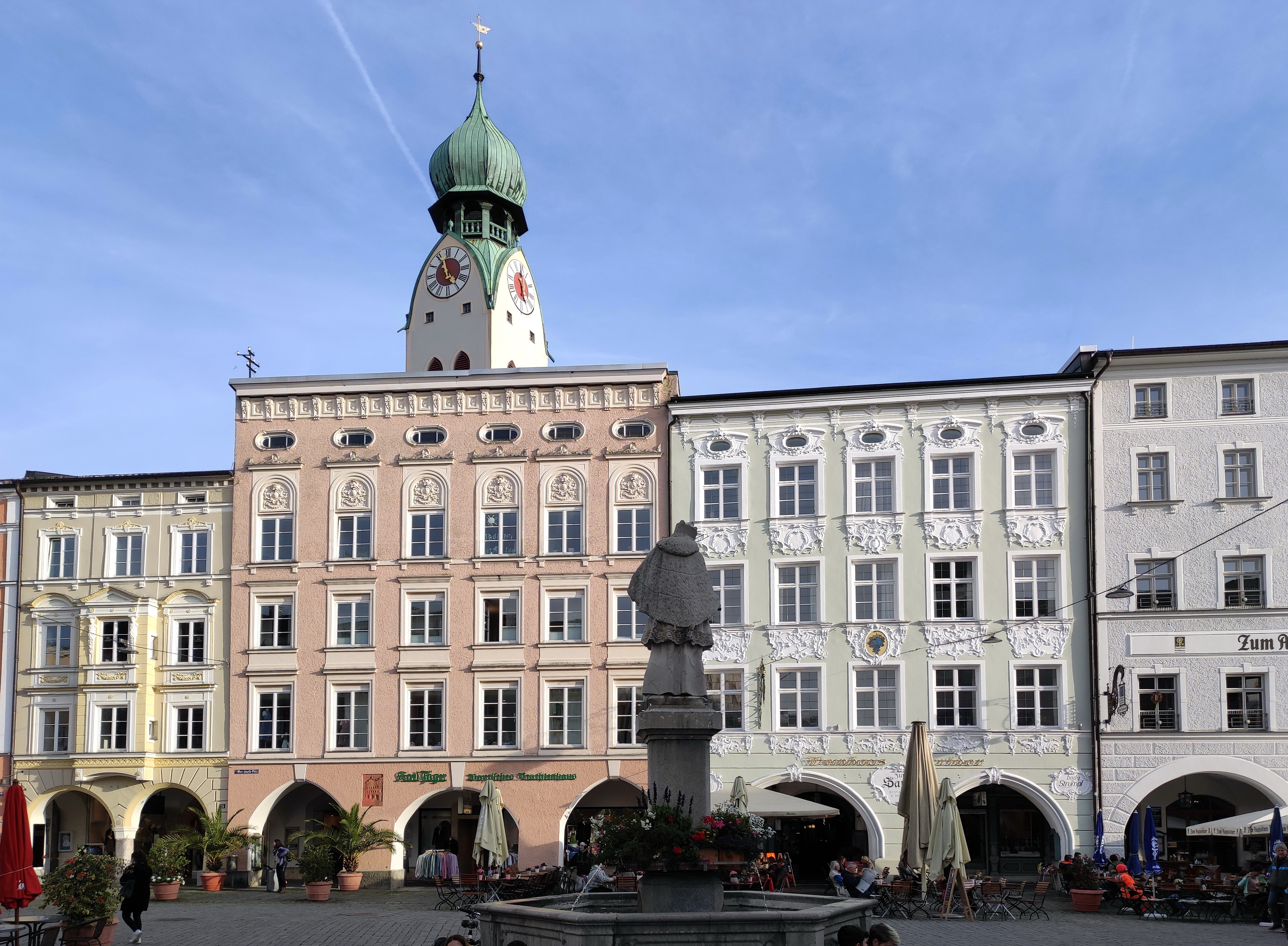
Max Josefs Platz in the center of Rosenheim

Featured former residence cities are the capital Munich, Ingolstadt and Neuburg an der Donau and the diocesan towns of Freising and Eichstätt. Interesting townscapes are found at Landsberg am Lech, Wasserburg am Inn and Burghausen and further south Bad Reichenhall and Berchtesgaden.

The highest mountain in Upper Bavaria, Zugspitze, offers a panoramic view of the Alps. The region includes popular recreational lakes including the Tegernsee, Schliersee, and Spitzingsee. The larger lakes, like Starnberger See, Ammersee (south-west of Munich), and Chiemsee further to the east, all situated in the pre-alpine uplands, offer regular passenger services on steamers.

Sacred art treasures can be found in the monasteries Andechs, Schäftlarn, Fürstenfeld, Benediktbeuern, Polling and Ettal and in the Wieskirche. Among popular excursions in Upper Bavaria are the Koenigssee with the Sanctuary of St Bartholomew's and mount Watzmann, the royal castles of Ludwig II, Linderhof and Herrenchiemsee in Chiemsee, the Burghausen Castle and the castle Hohenaschau. The most important places of pilgrimage are Altoetting and Tuntenhausen.
