= MIJARC Europe =

MIJARC Europe (Mouvement International de la Jeunesse Agricole et Rurale Catholique, or International Movement of Catholic Agricultural and Rural Youth) is the European continental branch of MIJARC. It is the platform or umbrella organization, representing the catholic, agricultural and rural youth movements in Europe. MIJARC Europe brings together youth organizations from Portugal (JARC), Spain (MJRC), France (MRJC), Belgium (KLJ), Germany (KLJB), Bulgaria (YMDRAB), Armenia (FYCA), Georgia (Umbrella), Malta (Innovative Youth), and Romania (APSD-Agenda 21), representing around 170 000 rural young people aged from 12 to 35 years old. Italy (EuroYouth) takes part as an observer member. The organisation is rooted in Christian values and works with rural youth organisations across Europe At world level, MIJARC represents more than two million young people from Asia, Africa, Latin America and Europe.

MIJARC Europe
Name	MIJARC Europe
Logo	
Official Formation	1996; 30 years ago
Purpose	Umbrella organization of international youth organizations
Headquarters	Brussels, Belgium
Number of members	more than 170,000 members
President	Medea Pavliashvili
Treasurer	Hrachya Javadyan
Legal Representative	Sophie Utner
Website	www.mijarc-europe.org

Officially registered in 1996 as non-profit organization, based in Belgium, MIJARC Europe strives to implement and raise awareness about sustainable agricultural, rural and international development, European citizenship, youth policies, gender equality, environmental protection, interculturality and human rights, by facilitating inter-cultural exchanges, camps, seminars, campaigns and non-formal learning opportunities in a sustainable and culturally sensitive manner, considering the Christian values. MIJARC Europe is driven by Christian values, advocating tolerance, respect, solidarity and peace. MIJARC Europe supports the empowerment and personal development of young people through educational activities, with the aim of creating opportunities for the development of thriving rural communities. Its various activities (summer camps, seminars, training courses, study-sessions and non-formal learning opportunities) empower young people to participate actively in society to advocate for the interests of their organisations and communities on a local and European level.

MIJARC Europe is a member of the European Youth Forum (YFJ) and the European Coordination La Via Campesina (ECVC) and has a participatory status in the Council of Europe, with a representative in the Advisory Council on Youth.

== History ==
Catholic rural youth movements existed before the Second World War, but international cooperation between them developed more strongly in the post-war period. The aim was to promote exchange among rural young people from different countries and to contribute to greater social and economic justice. Movements from Flanders, Wallonia, France, the Netherlands, Luxembourg, Italy, Germany, Portugal, Switzerland, and Austria subsequently came together to establish the International Catholic Movement for Rural and Agricultural Youth (French: Mouvement International de la Jeunesse Agricole et Rurale Catholique, MIJARC).

MIJARC was created to represent the interests of rural and agricultural youth beyond the national level and became involved in various international organisations and institutions.

=== The 1960s and 1970s ===
During the 1960s, MIJARC Europe increasingly addressed political and social developments affecting rural youth in Europe, including European economic integration, the development of the European Economic Community, market integration, and migration. The organisation provided a forum for rural young people to discuss these changes and their impact on rural communities.

In 1965, MIJARC Europe organised a European Festival in Stuttgart, Germany, which brought together more than 20,000 young people from across Europe. The event was one of the movement's largest international gatherings during this period.

=== The 1980s and 1990s ===
During the 1980s, MIJARC Europe broadened its work to include issues such as the role of women in rural areas, international solidarity, genetically modified organisms, and debates about the future of Europe. These topics were addressed through seminars, training activities, and other international events involving rural young people from across Europe.

Following the political changes in Central and Eastern Europe at the end of the 1980s and beginning of the 1990s, MIJARC Europe developed contacts with rural youth organisations in countries including Poland, Hungary, Slovenia, and Latvia. An East-West Working Group was established to support this cooperation, alongside bilateral partnerships between organisations.

In 1996, MIJARC Europe became legally autonomous from MIJARC World. It was registered as an independent organisation in Belgium on 28 November 1996.

=== The 2000s ===
In the early 2000s, MIJARC Europe strengthened its cooperation with European networks including the European Youth Forum (YFJ) and the European Coordination Via Campesina (ECVC), increasing its involvement in discussions concerning rural youth and agricultural policy at the European level.

In 2005, MIJARC Europe cooperated with Rural Youth Europe (RYE) on a pilot project supported by the European Commission. Together, the organisations represented more than 700,000 rural young people from over 30 countries and worked to increase the participation of rural youth in European policy discussions, particularly in areas related to agriculture and rural development.

=== The 2010s and 2020s ===
During the 2010s, MIJARC Europe expanded its network and developed cooperation with youth organisations in countries including Armenia, Romania, and Malta. This contributed to broader exchanges between rural youth organisations from different parts of Europe.

MIJARC Europe also increased its participation in Erasmus+ activities, particularly under Key Actions 1 and 3, and continued its cooperation with the European Youth Foundation. Through these programmes and partnerships, the organisation supported international learning opportunities, youth participation, advocacy, and cooperation among rural young people across Europe.

=== The COVID-19 and Beyond ===
During the COVID-19 pandemic, MIJARC Europe adapted its activities to online formats in response to restrictions on travel and in-person meetings.

During this period, the organisation also participated in the Our Food Our Future project, coordinated by Christliche Initiative Romero (CIR) and supported through the European Commission’s DEAR Programme. The project focused on promoting more sustainable and rights-based food systems, including issues related to agroecology.

As restrictions were lifted, MIJARC Europe resumed in-person activities and continued its work on youth participation, equality, inclusion, and the involvement of young people living in rural areas.

== Structure ==
MIJARC Europe member movements have a "bottom-up" structure, starting at the grassroots level. Rural young people gather in local groups. Their leaders gather in regional (diocesan) boards, and some regional representatives gather at the national level (national board).

MIJARC Europe itself is run by the Executive Board or European Team, composed of three to five elected representatives that can be proposed by member movements.

The European Team is observed by the European Coordination, which is composed by one elected representative from each member movement, called European coordinator.

At the top of decision-making is the General Assembly which is represented by each member movement. Every four years is led an "Orientations General Assembly" which prepares and decides the action plan of MIJARC Europe for the next four years. The next one is scheduled for 2029.

== Working topics (2025 - 2029) ==
After the OGA in 2025 it was decided to structure MIJARC Europe's work around several thematic priority areas. The orientations discussed by its member organisations include:

Youth participation and democracy – strengthening the participation of rural young people in democratic processes, supporting local youth initiatives and promoting active citizenship.

Agriculture and rural development – advocating for rural youth, sustainable agriculture and agroecology, including engagement with European agricultural and rural development policies.

International cooperation and networking – strengthening cooperation between member organisations, facilitating international exchanges and increasing the participation of rural young people in European and international activities.

Values, faith and dialogue – reflecting on MIJARC Europe's values and its Christian roots while fostering dialogue and inclusion across its network.

Organisational development and governance – strengthening the internal structures, sustainability and development of MIJARC Europe and its network.

== Working topics (2017 - 2021) ==
MIJARC Europe's Action Plan for 2017-2021 includes specific objectives on the topics of:

- Human rights
- A European vision towards an interconnected world
- Environmental protection
- Youth participation
- Food sovereignty and sustainable agriculture in Europe
- Holistic quality of education and lifelong learning in rural areas (with special emphasis in the recognition of non-formal and informal education)
- Solidarity based economy

== Current Board ==
The board consists of three to five members and is elected for a mandate of three years at the General Assembly. The board members act on the same hierarchical level. Currently the board looks like this:

Name	Position	Nationality	Member Organisation	Member of the Board since
Medea Pavliashvili	President	Georgia	UMBRELLA	2024
Sophie Utner	Legal Representative	Germany	KLJB	2025
Hrachya Javadyan	Treasurer	Armenia	FYCA	2023

== Former Board members ==
Name	Nationality	Mandate
Hrachya Javadyan	Armenia	2026-present
Sophie Utner	Germany	2025-present
Medea Pavliashvili	Georgia	2024-present
Hrachya Javadyan	Armenia	2023-2026
Simon Guerin Sanz	France	2023-2025
Denis Lageiro	Portugal	2023-2023
Ionut Dochianu	Romania	2022-2025
Isabelle Rutkowski	Germany	2022-2024
Enya Putignano	Malta	2021-2022
Adelina Zhiyanski	Bulgaria	2020-2023
Sophie Fromentin	France	2020-2022
Jannis Fughe	Germany	2020-2022
Armine Movsesyan	Armenia	2020-2021
Sara Neagu	Romania	2019-2022
Cristiana Palma	Portugal	2017-2020
Daniela Ordowski	Germany	2017-2020
Claire Perrot-Minot	France	2017-2020
Arman Grigoryan	Armenia	2017-2020
Anastasia Cârjan	Romania	2015-2016
Alexandru Hanny	Romania	2015-2016
Jeroen Decorte	Belgium	2014-2017
Veronika Nordhus	Germany	2014-2017
Thibault Duisit	France	2014-2017
Jan Vanwijnsberghe	Belgium	2013-2015
Anna Caryk	Poland	2012-2014
Lyubomir Todorov	Bulgaria	2009-2014
Olivier Dugrain	France	2011-2014
Florian Aurbacher	Germany	2011-2014
Claire Quin	France	2009-2012
Jürgen Westermann	Germany	2009-2012
Gaëtan Vallée	France	2006-2009
