= Barbara Stamm =

German politician (1944–2022)

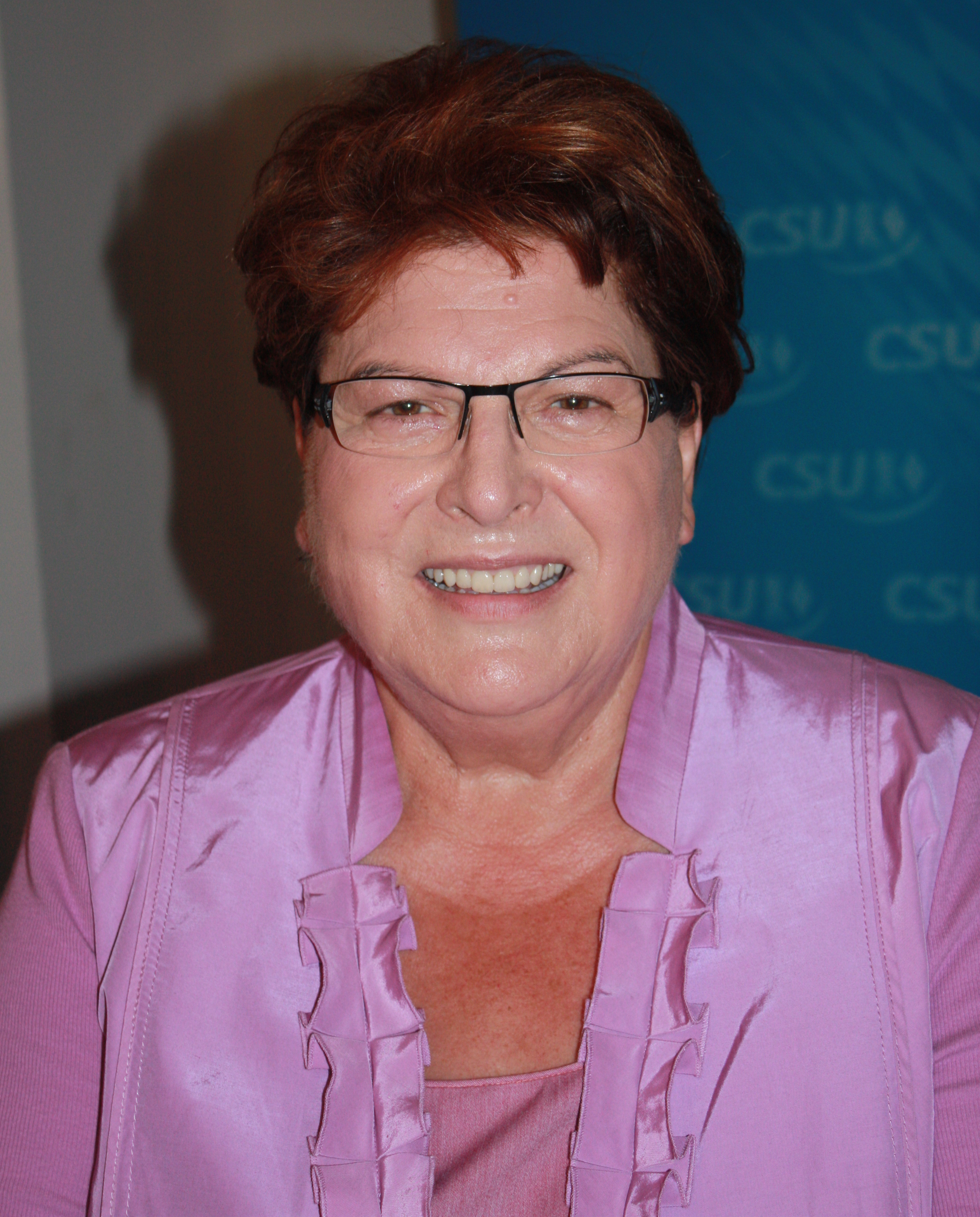
- Stamm in 2013

President of the Landtag of Bavaria
- In office 20 October 2008 – 5 November 2018
- Preceded by: Alois Glück
- Succeeded by: Ilse Aigner

Deputy Minister President of Bavaria
- In office 6 October 1998 – 29 January 2001
- Minister-President: Edmund Stoiber
- Preceded by: Hans Zehetmair
- Succeeded by: Günther Beckstein

Minister of Labour, Social Order, Family, Women and Health of Bavaria
- In office 27 October 1994 – 29 January 2001
- Minister-President: Edmund Stoiber
- Preceded by: Gebhard Glück
- Succeeded by: Christa Stewens

Personal details
- Born: Barbara Stocker; 29 October 1944 Bad Mergentheim, Württemberg, Germany
- Died: 5 October 2022 (aged 77) Würzburg, Bavaria, Germany
- Party: Christian Social Union
- Spouse: Ludwig Stamm
- Children: 3, including Claudia
- Awards: Order of Merit of the Federal Republic of Germany; Bayerische Verfassungsmedaille; Order of the Star of Romania; Order of St. Gregory the Great

Barbara Stamm (née Stocker; 29 October 1944 – 5 October 2022) was a German politician of the Christian Social Union in Bavaria. She joined the CSU in 1969, was a member of the town council of Würzburg from 1972, and a member of the Landtag of Bavaria from 1976. She was vice-chair of the CSU from 1993 to 2017, and President of the Landtag from 2008 to 2018, the first woman in the position. She was regarded as the most popular Bavarian politician and as her party's "social conscience".

== Life and career ==
Barbara Stocker was born in Bad Mergentheim on 29 October 1944 to a deaf mother. She grew up with foster parents until age eight, when her mother came to take her home. She had an alcoholic stepfather, who hit her. At times she recovered in a Kinderheim.

In the 1960s, she trained to be a kindergarten teacher (Erzieherin), made possible by a loan from her religion teacher. She worked as Erzieherin and in the care of young people (Jugendarbeit) of the Diocese of Würzburg. She met her future husband at the time, who encouraged her to turn to politics.

=== Political career ===
Stamm joined the Christian Social Union (CSU) in 1969. She was a member of the town council of Würzburg from 1972 to 1987. She was a member of the Bavarian parliament from 1976 to 2018. She served as deputy chairwoman of the CSU from 1993 until 2017. She was from 1990 Bavaria's commissioner in Romania.

From 1994 until 2001, Stamm was Bavarian State Minister for Health in the government of Minister-President Edmund Stoiber. From 1994 to 2001 she also was Deputy Minister-President of Bavaria. From 2008 to 2018 she served as President of the Landtag of Bavaria. She was a candidate again in 2018, but due to her party's low result was not elected again.

Stamm served as a CSU delegate to the Federal Convention for the purpose of electing the President of Germany in 2004, 2009, 2010, 2012, and 2017. In the negotiations to form a coalition government following the 2013 federal elections, she was part of the 15-member leadership circle chaired by Angela Merkel, Horst Seehofer and Sigmar Gabriel.

=== Personal life ===
Stamm and her husband, Ludwig Stamm, had three children. One, Claudia Stamm (born 1970), was a member of the Bavarian Landtag, from 2009 until 2017 for the Alliance 90/The Greens, then until 2018 without party association.

Barbara Stamm was diagnosed with breast cancer in 2008, and again in 2018.

Stamm died in Würzburg on 5 October 2022 at age 77.

== Other activities ==
- Lebenshilfe, president from 2001
- Bayerischer Rundfunk (BR), president of the Board of Directors (Verwaltungsrat) from 2008 to 2013
- University of Würzburg, member of the Board of Trustees, from 2019 honorary senators
- Technical University of Munich (TUM), member of the Board of Trustees (Hochschulrat) from 2015
- Gegen Vergessen – Für Demokratie, member of the Advisory Board

== Awards ==
Stamm received the Bavarian Order of Merit in 1987, and the Order of Merit of the Federal Republic of Germany in 1990. She was awarded the Bayerische Verfassungsmedaille in silver and gold in 1999. In 2000, she became an officer of the Order of the Star of Romania.

In 2019, Stamm was honoured by the papal Order of St Gregory the Great. Bishop Franz Jung called her "an outstanding political personality who has always been known as a Christian and as a Catholic, even when she was criticized for it by dissenters" ("herausragende Politiker persönlichkeit, die sich stets als Christin, als Katholikin bekannt hat – auch dann, wenn sie von Andersdenkenden dafür kritisiert wurde"). The same year, she was named an honorary senator of the University of Würzburg.

| Preceded by Alois Glück | Presidents of the Landtag of Bavaria; 2008–2018 | Succeeded by Ilse Aigner |
