= Johann Böhm (German politician) =

German politician

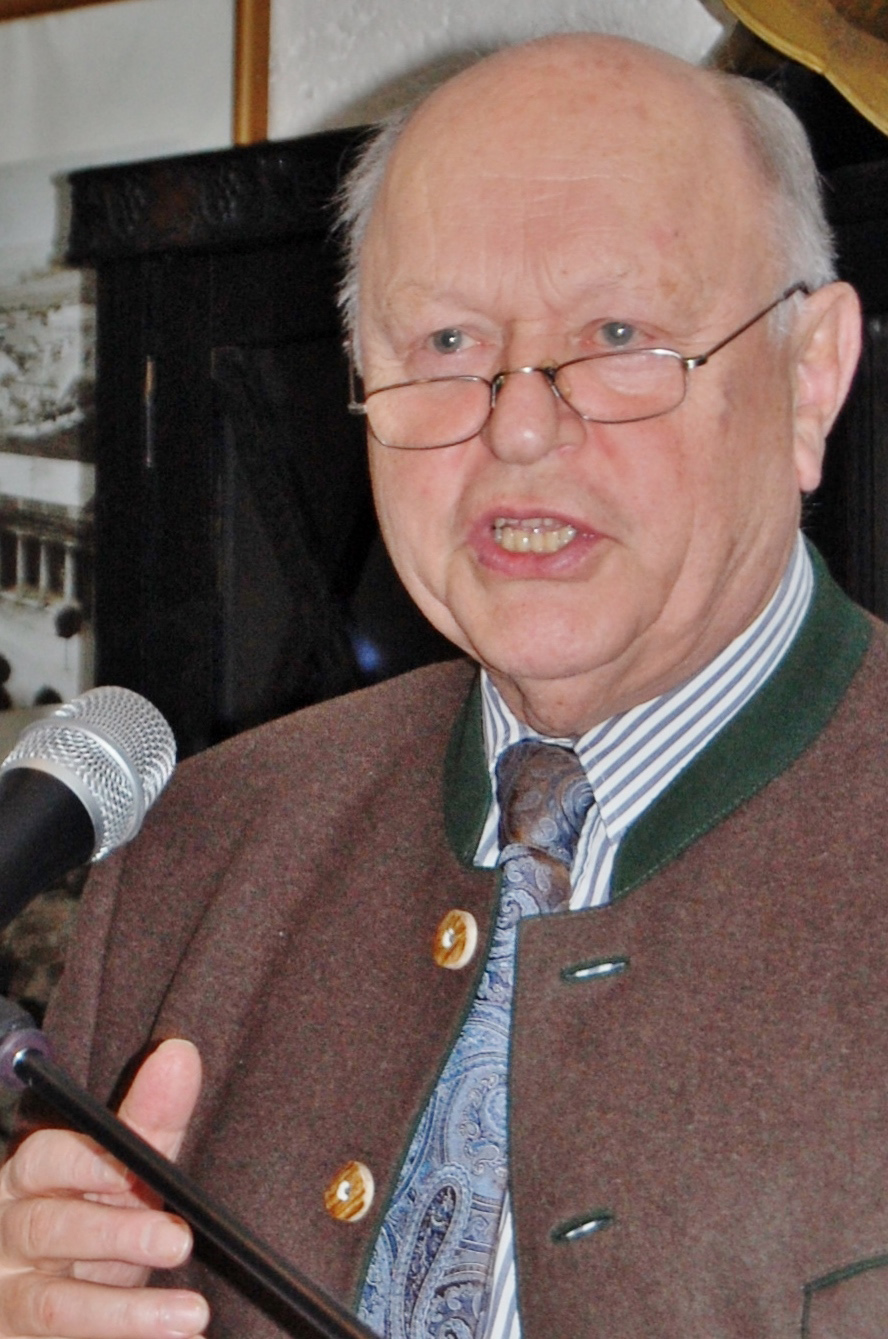
Böhm in 2015

Johann Böhm (born 18 October 1937 in Dasnice, Czechoslovakia) is a German politician, representative of the Christian Social Union of Bavaria (CSU). He was a member of the Landtag of Bavaria from 1974 to 2003, and was President of the Landtag of Bavaria from 1994 to 2003.

== See also ==
- List of Bavarian Christian Social Union politicians

Preceded by Wilhelm Vorndran	Presidents of the Landtag of Bavaria; 1994–2003	Succeeded by Alois Glück
