= Reichszentrale für Heimatsdienst =

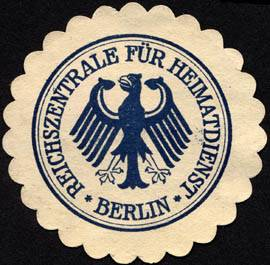
Emblem of the Reichszentrale für Heimatdienst

Reichszentrale für Heimatdienst ("Reich Agency for Homeland Service") was an organisation established in Germany in March 1918 to disseminate propaganda and educational material. It was soon to play a role in the emergent Weimar Republic. The organisation was dissolved on 16 March 1933 following the Nazi seizure of power. In many ways it was replaced by Joseph Goebbels's Reich Ministry of Public Enlightenment and Propaganda established on 14 March 1933.

== Origins ==
The Heimatdienst was first set up as the "Zentrale für Heimatdienst" under the control of Erhard Deutelmoser, head of the Kriegspresseamt (War Press Office), overseen by the Oberste Heeresleitung (OHL) or Supreme Army Command. During the German Revolution of 1918, the Council of the People's Deputies placed it under the control of Philipp Scheidemann, a leading politician from the Majority Social Democratic Party of Germany. During the next few months its main role was producing propaganda in the Berlin area in favour of the Council of the People's Deputies and against the system of Workers' Councils advocated by the Spartacus League. In November 1919, it was renamed as the Reichszentrale für Heimatdienst and on 1 January 1920, the Deutschen Zentralverlags (German Central Publishing House) was set up as a private company subordinated to the Heimatdienst with a similar offshoot the Deutschen Lichtbilddienst (German photographic service) being established in 1922.
