= Climate-Alliance Germany =

German alliance of Climate organisations

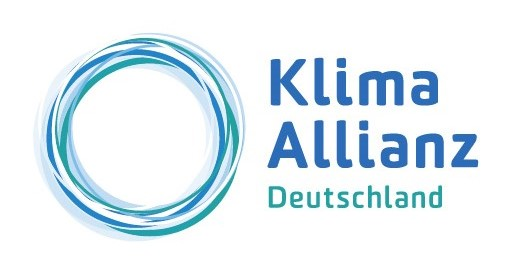
- Established: 24 April 2007 (19 years ago)
- Legal status: Registered association
- Headquarters: Berlin
- Country: Germany
- Membership: 150 (2026)
- Revenue: 1,514,000 euro (2023)
- Employees: 13 (2023)
- Website: www.klima-allianz.de/english/

Climate-Alliance Germany (German: Klima-Allianz Deutschland) is a network of about 150 civil society organizations, including environment groups, development groups, churches, organisations from the fields of youth, education, culture, social welfare and health, as well as trade unions, and consumer associations. Founded in 2007, the aim of the Alliance is to provide a common front to apply pressure to German decision-makers to adopt socially just climate action measures. Prominent members include WWF, BUND (or Friends of the Earth Germany), and the trade union ver.di.

A key issue for the Alliance is the prevention of new coal-fired power plants (the Anti-Coal Campaign). The Alliance wants the German government to phase-out coal (Kohleausstieg) and promote renewable energy.

== Activities ==
=== Coordination of Climate Protection Plan 2050 and Programme of Measures 2030 ===
Coordinated by Climate Alliance Germany, more than 50 organisations published the "Climate Protection Plan 2050 of German Civil Society" in November 2016 as a result of a broad participation process. In it, they call for more ambitious climate protection targets and legal binding force. As a national response to the Paris Climate Agreement, the German government had previously published its Climate Protection Plan 2050, which was criticised by Climate Alliance Germany as insufficient.

Climate Alliance Germany then coordinated the "Climate Protection 2030 Action Programme of German Civil Society". More than sixty organisations from across the spectrum of civil society describe in the extensive demands paper the measures they see as necessary in all fields of climate policy in order for Germany to achieve its climate target of 2030. The central demands are an early exit from coal, the rapid implementation of changes in the transport and agricultural sectors, and an ambitious price for CO_{2}. Both projects were funded by the German Federal Ministry for the Environment.

=== Berlin Climate Talks ===
Since November 2015, Climate Alliance Germany has hosted the Berlin Climate Talks on changing topics several times a year. The events take place in cooperation with its member organisations. The panel guests have already included several federal ministers, state secretaries and party leaders. The first event was dedicated to civil society proposals for a more climate-friendly air transport concept for Germany.

=== Anti-Coal Campaign ===
Climate Alliance Germany advocates an ambitious coal phase-out. The reduction of coal generation and coal mining is a key element in meeting German and international climate targets and achieving the necessary decarbonisation in terms of effective climate protection. For this reason, the Alliance demands that no new opencast mines be approved. Existing opencast mines in the Rhineland lignite mining area, in Lusatia and in Central Germany are not to be expanded but reduced in size.

The structural change in the lignite regions must be actively shaped politically and financially secured, for example through a structural change fund. In cooperation with local and regional groups, Climate Alliance Germany is also committed to the preservation of villages and landscapes threatened by opencast mining. In order to achieve these goals, the Alliance has made the legal, economic and social aspects of the commercial use of coal a priority issue. In political talks, demand papers, expert reports and studies, Climate Alliance Germany points out the dangers of coal-fired power generation for the climate, environment and health. In addition, it creates public attention through media reports, events, actions and demonstrations.

From 2008 to 2013, Climate Alliance Germany organized an anti-coal campaign to prevent new coal-fired power plants in Germany. The Alliance coordinated and supported civil society activities. As a result of the campaign in cooperation with citizens' initiatives, environmental associations and activists from various sectors of society, 17 climate-damaging coal-fired power plant projects were stopped during this period.

Following a Greenpeace protest against lignite mining in the Lausitz in September 2013, a petition of 112,157 signatures in support was handed to the Lausitz authorities. Daniela Setton, an energy policy speaker from the Alliance, commented that it was the most successful collection of signatures against a new German opencast mine ever.

In July 2014 the Alliance co-authored and co-published a report on the top 30 most polluting coal-fired power plants in Europe and called for their decommissioning.

In July 2016, the Alliance, together with BUND, the Heinrich Böll Foundation, and the Rosa Luxemburg Foundation released a report on the aftermath of lignite mining in Germany. The report, co-authored by IASS Potsdam, argues that the financial resources needed to remedy the damage caused by lignite mining are not adequately backed up by the existing mining operators Vattenfall (who later sold its lignite-fired plants and mines to EPH), RWE, and MIBRAG.

=== Climate Manifesto ===
The Climate Manifesto is a manifesto initiated by Climate Alliance Germany in 2016 describing a vision of the climate movement. The text calls on politicians and society to work for a world that is oriented towards the goals of the Paris Climate Agreement and the global goals for sustainable development. The member organisations of Climate Alliance Germany were involved in its creation.

The manifesto identifies climate change and the high consumption of natural resources as global and urgent challenges that can only be met through joint efforts. It emphasises that the problems of a globalised world with extreme injustice and inequality can only be solved through global cooperation and solidarity. The industrialised countries, which have built up their prosperity on the basis of fossil fuels and have thus significantly caused climate change, have a special responsibility in this respect.

The climate manifesto was presented in September 2016 at a festive event on the meadow in front of the Reichstag building in Berlin. Ahead of the Bundestag elections in the following year, leaders of the parties represented in the Bundestag were also invited.

=== Networking and training ===
In addition to activist activities, the Alliance mediates and maintains the substantive and tactical networks of its member organizations and with other civil society actors. In addition, Climate Alliance Germany offers its members opportunities for further development, for example through specific seminars.

=== Global Climate Day of Action ===
From 2007 to 2015, Climate Alliance Germany organised nationwide demonstrations for the annual Global Climate Day of Action. The goal was to protest at the lack of environmental awareness in politics and the economy and to encourage climate protection measures.

Alliance spokesperson Katharina Reuter, in an interview with Deutschlandfunk in December 2011, criticized the exit by Canada from the Kyoto Protocol.

=== Alternative Energy Summit ===
The Alliance organized an Alternative Energy Summit annually from 2010 to 2015 where energy and climate policy issues were discussed.

In an April 2016 media report about the future of RWE, an Alliance expert stated that the power company had become completely unprofitable after failing to adapt to the German Energiewende.

== Organization ==
Fundamental political decisions are made in a plenum that meets at least twice a year. The secretariat is responsible for implementing the resolutions in coordination with a "speakers' council" made up of up to ten representatives from member organizations, who are elected in a plenary session. The "speakers' council" makes decisions between the plena and determines the annual plan.

Climate Alliance Germany has been a non-profit, registered association since 2022. Previously, from 2014 to 2021, its legal entity was the Forum Ecological-Social Market Economy. The budget (2022: around 956,000 euros) is covered by income from project funds and membership fees. Since January 2023, Climate Alliance Germany receives institutional funding from the German Federal Ministry for Economic Affairs and Climate Protection. Projects are currently (2023) funded the Mercator Foundation, the Allianz Foundation and the Federal Ministry for the Environment, Nature Conservation and Nuclear Safety. About 15 per cent of the budget is achieved through membership fees, plus donations of a small amount. Past projects have also been funded by the European Climate Foundation, the Children's Investment Fund, the DBU, the Federal Project Management Jülich and other foundations.

== See also ==
- Climate Action Network – an umbrella group for environmental NGOs active on climate change
- List of environmental organizations § Germany
- The Climate Reality Project – a non-profit organization involved in climate change education and advocacy
- VENRO (Association of German Development and Humanitarian Aid NGOs)
