= Isarkreis =

Former administrative district of the Kingdom of Bavaria

- Regierungsbezirk of the Kingdom of Bavaria
- 1808–1837
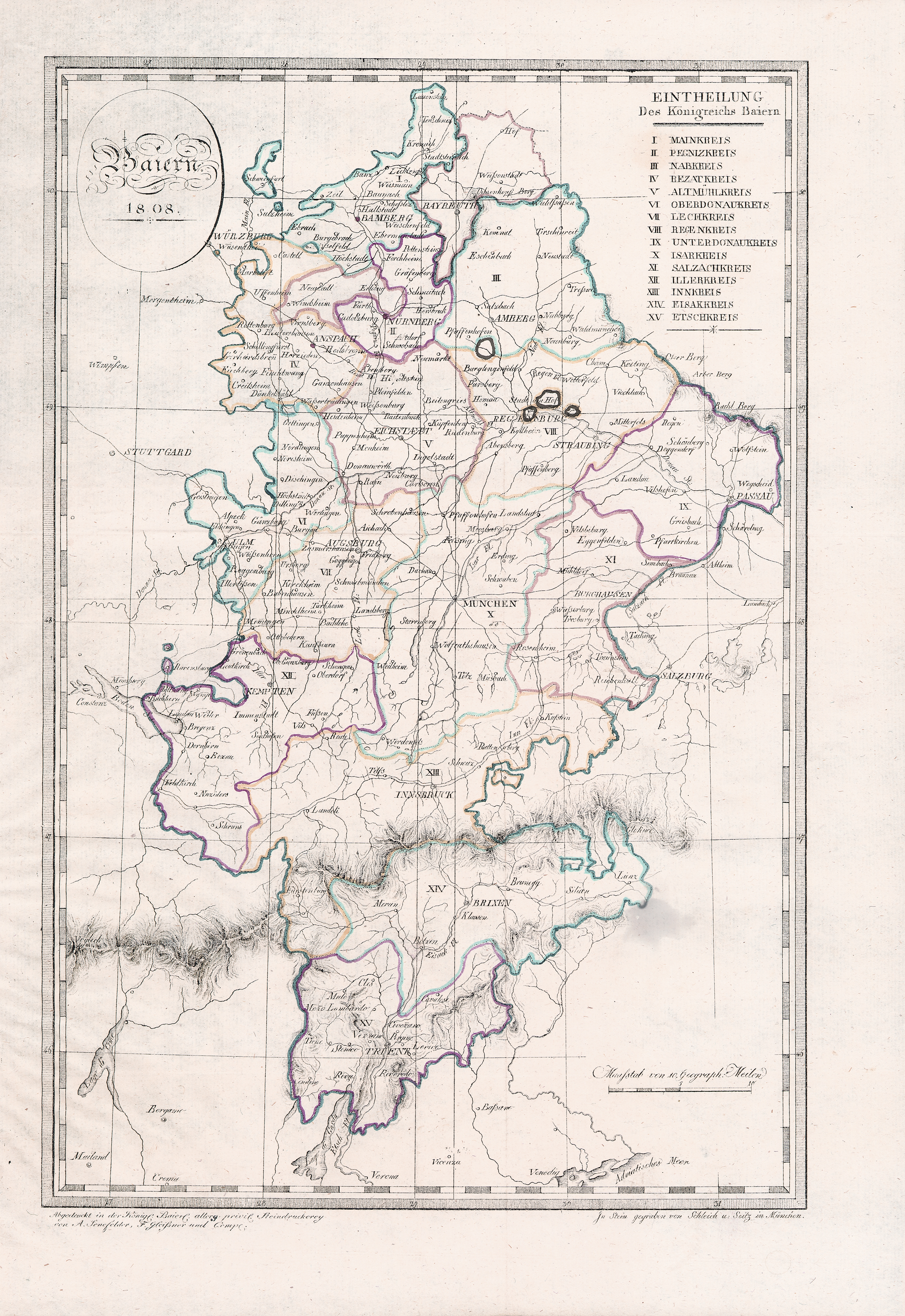
- Districts of Bavaria, including Tyrol, in 1808
- Capital: Munich
- History
  - Established: 1808
  - Disestablished: 1837
Succeeded by
Upper Bavaria
- Today part of: Bavaria

The Isarkreis (German: Isar District) was one of the 15 administrative districts (German: Bezirke or Regierungsbezirke) of the Kingdom of Bavaria between 1808 and 1837. It is named after its main river, the Isar. It was the predecessor of the Regierungsbezirk Oberbayern (Administrative District of Upper Bavaria).

== History ==
In 1808 the Kingdom of Bavaria was divided into 15 districts. Their names were taken from their main rivers. The Isarkreis, with Munich as its capital, was initially composed of 14 rural divisions and, since 1809, of the independent cities of Munich and Landsberg. In 1810, the Isarkreis was expanded. In 1817, there was another reshuffle; some areas were added and other ones given to the Upper Danube District (Oberdonaukreis). In another territorial reorganization initiated by King Ludwig I on 29 November 1837, the Isarkreis was renamed Upper Bavaria (Oberbayern).

== Independent cities ==
- Munich
- Landshut

== Subdivisions ==
The district was divided in the following judicial districts (Landgerichte = LG), according to the original borders of the districts of the former territories (Herrschaftsgerichte = HG):

- Aichach (since 1810),
- Altötting (since 1817),
- Berchtesgaden (since 1817),
- Brannenburg (since 1814),
- Burghausen (since 1817),
- Dachau,
- Ebersberg (since 1812),
- Erding,
- Freising,
- Friedberg (since 1810),
- Landsberg am Lech (since 1810),
- Landshut,
- Laufen (since 1817),
- Miesbach,
- Moosburg,
- Mühldorf (since 1810),
- Munich,
- Neubeuern (since 1813),
- Pfaffenhofen,
- Prien (since 1813),
- Rosenheim (since 1810),
- Schrobenhausen (abt 1810),
- Schwaben (until 1812),
- Starnberg,
- Tegernsee (since 1814),
- Teisendorf (since 1817),
- Tittmoning (since 1817),
- Tölz,
- Traunstein (since 1817),
- Trostberg (since 1810),
- Vilsbiburg (since 1810),
- Wasserburg (since 1810),
- Weilheim,
- Werdenfels (until 1810 and since 1814),
- Wolfratshausen
