= Bavarian Order of Merit =

Order of Merit of the Free State of Bavaria

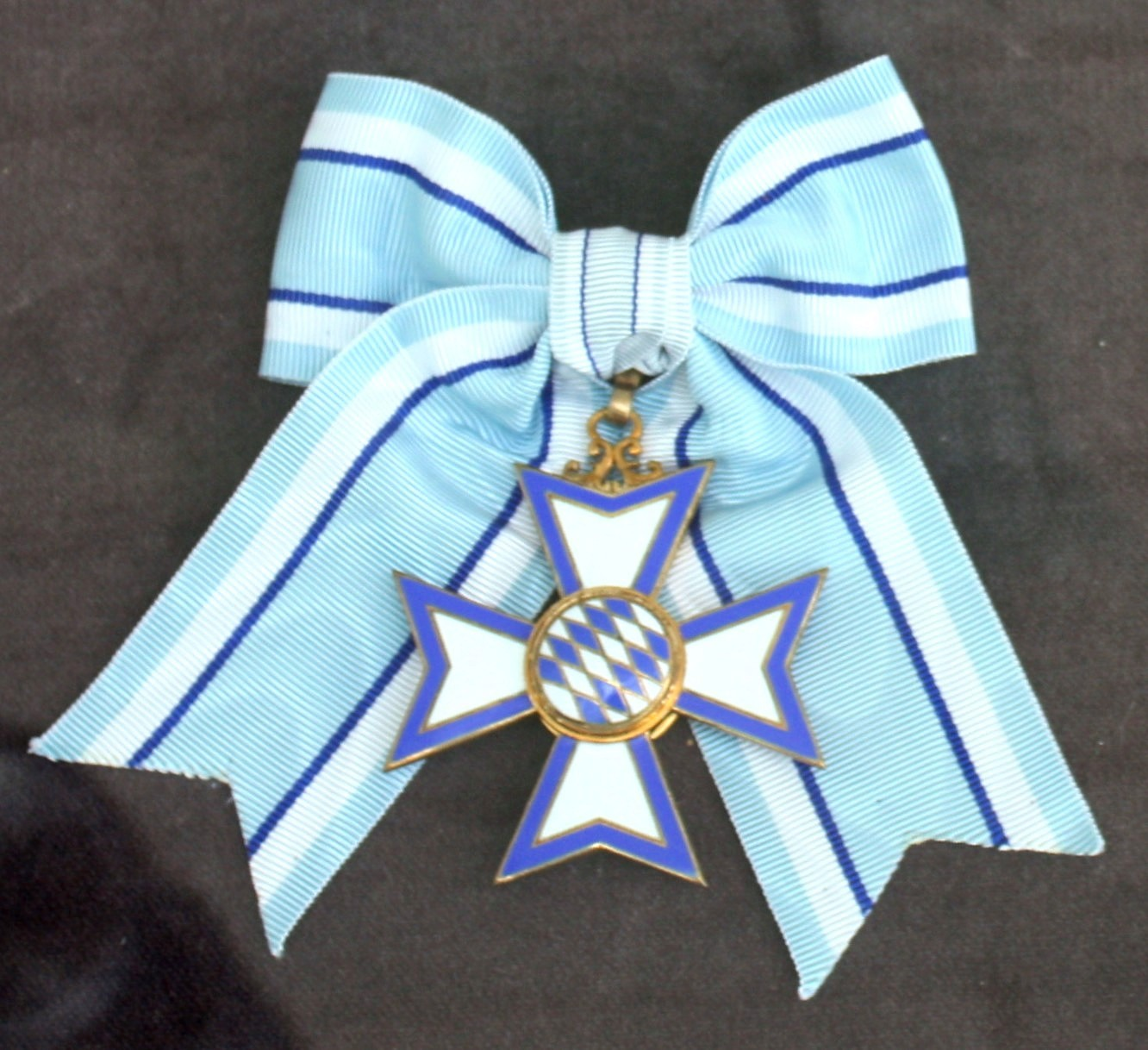
- Badge of the order for women

Awarded by the Minister-President of Bavaria
- Type: Order of Merit
- Established: 11 June 1957
- Country: Bavaria, Germany
- Eligibility: Men and women without distinction of nationality or class
- Awarded for: Outstanding contributions to the Free State of Bavaria and the Bavarian people
- Status: Currently awarded
- Founder: Wilhelm Hoegner
- Ordensherr: Markus Söder

Statistics
- Total inductees: 5,602 (as of August 2018)

Precedence
- Next (higher): Bavarian Maximilian Order for Science and Art
- Related: Order of Merit of the Bavarian Crown; Order of the Lion of Bavaria
- Ribbon bar of the order

The Bavarian Order of Merit (German: Bayerischer Verdienstorden) is the Order of Merit of the Free State of Bavaria. It is awarded by the Minister-President of Bavaria as a "recognition of outstanding contributions to the Free State of Bavaria and the Bavarian people".

The order was instituted by law on 11 June 1957. The Prime Minister and the Cabinet can nominate awardees.

Hemmerle, a German jewellery house based in Munich founded in 1893, is the exclusive maker of the Bavarian Order of Merit since it was instituted in 1957.

List of recipients
- Hermann Josef Abs
- Ann-Kristin Achleitner
- Josef Ackermann (journalist)
- Lea Ackermann
- Konrad Adenauer
- Percy Adlon
- Mario Adorf
- Josef Afritsch
- Heinrich Aigner
- Ilse Aigner
- Korbinian Aigner
- Werner Andreas Albert
- Walter Althammer
- Paul Althaus
- Axel von Ambesser
- Tobias Angerer
- Willi Ankermüller
- Gisela Anton
- Evangelos Averoff
- Georg Bachmann
- Rudolf Bachmann
- Friedrich Baethgen
- Michael Ballhaus
- Klaus Barthel
- Władysław Bartoszewski
- Rainer Barzel
- Baudouin of Belgium
- Friedrich L. Bauer
- Heinz Bauer
- Josef Bauer (politician)
- Gustl Bayrhammer
- Augustin Bea
- Walter Becher
- Franz Beckenbauer
- Günther Beckstein
- Heinrich Bedford-Strohm
- Hildegard Behrens
- Werner Beierwaltes
- Heinrich Bender (conductor)
- Pope Benedict XVI
- Lilian Benningsen
- Iris Berben
- Roland Berger
- Senta Berger
- Mathilde Berghofer-Weichner
- Karl-Friedrich Beringer
- Lennart Bernadotte
- Sonja Bernadotte
- Otto Bernheimer
- Christian Bernreiter
- Anton Betz
- Gerhard Bletschacher
- Peter Boenisch
- Willy Bogner Jr.
- Kurt Böhme
- Uwe Brandl
- Eberhard von Brauchitsch
- Klaus Dieter Breitschwert
- Beppo Brem
- Heinrich von Brentano
- Hans Breuer (politician)
- Alois von Brinz
- Dominik Brunner
- Aenne Burda
- Franz Burda
- Adolf Butenandt
- José Carreras
- Karl Carstens
- Sergiu Celibidache
- Jean Charest
- Princess Christa of Thurn and Taxis
- Hans Clarin
- Maurice Couve de Murville
- Ernst Cramer (journalist)
- Herbert Czaja
- Aden Adde
- Thomas Dachser
- Viktor Josef Dammertz
- Diana Damrau
- Adolf Dassler
- Rudolf Dassler
- Colin Davis
- Michael S. Davison
- Jacques Delors
- Albert Dess
- Alfred Dick (politician)
- Paul Diethei
- Helmut Dietl
- Uschi Disl
- Renate Dodell
- Klaus Doldinger
- Julius Döpfner
- Claude Dornier
- Hans Drachsler
- Luis Durnwalder
- Rudolf Eberhard
- Gisela Ehrensperger
- Irenäus Eibl-Eibesfeldt
- Bernd Eichinger
- Hans A. Engelhard
- Matthias Engelsberger
- Kieth Engen
- Karl Engisch
- Annette Erös
- Reinhard Erös
- Kurt Faltlhauser
- Brigitte Fassbaender
- Hans-Josef Fell
- Ludwig Fellermaier
- Markus Ferber
- Fredl Fesl
- Wolfgang Fikentscher
- Ernst Otto Fischer
- Max Fischer (politician)
- Friedrich Flick
- Franz Joseph, 9th Prince of Thurn and Taxis
- Ludwig Franz
- Joseph von Fraunhofer
- Gottlob Frick
- Ingo Friedrich
- Karl von Frisch
- Cornelia Froboess
- Karl Fuchs (politician)
- Joachim Fuchsberger
- Joseph-Ernst Graf Fugger von Glött
- Maria Furtwängler
- John Galvin (general)
- Georg Gänswein
- Charles de Gaulle
- Peter Gauweiler
- Martina Gedeck
- Rudolf Geiger
- Willi Geiger (painter)
- Uschi Glas
- Gloria, Princess of Thurn and Taxis
- Peter Glotz
- Nora-Eugenie Gomringer
- Alfons Goppel
- Josef Göppel
- Silvia Görres
- Eveline Gottzein
- Franz Götz (politician)
- Hugo Grau
- Ulrich Grigull
- Monika Gruber
- Max Grundig
- Enoch zu Guttenberg
- Wolfgang Haber
- Peter Häberle
- Otto von Habsburg
- Dietmar Hahlweg
- Ingeborg Hallstein
- Bernhard Häring
- Anja Harteros
- Gerda Hasselfeldt
- Johannes Heesters
- Robert Heger
- Werner Heisenberg
- Florian Henckel von Donnersmarck
- Josef Henselmann
- Wolfgang A. Herrmann
- Friedrich August Freiherr von der Heydte
- Wilfried Hiller
- Friedrich Högner
- Karl Höller
- Christiane Hörbiger
- Melanie Huml
- Mariss Jansons
- Prince Johann Georg of Hohenzollern
- Marcus Junkelmann
- Konstantinos Karamanlis
- Karl, 8th Prince of Löwenstein-Wertheim-Rosenberg
- Ellis Kaut
- Joseph Keilberth
- Paul Kirchhof
- Susanne Klatten
- Carlos Kleiber
- Ewald-Heinrich von Kleist-Schmenzin
- Herbert Knaup
- Herlinde Koelbl
- Juliane Köhler
- Peter Jona Korn
- Platon Kornyljak
- Max Kruse (author)
- Rafael Kubelík
- Reiner Kunze
- Benno Kusche
- Bernard Landry
- Gottfried Landwehr
- Bernhard Langer
- Pascalina Lehnert
- Franz Lehrndorfer
- Robert Lembke
- Harald Lesch
- Sabine Leutheusser-Schnarrenberger
- Hans Ritter von Lex
- Herbert Loebl
- Loriot
- Heidi Lück
- Prince Luitpold of Bavaria (b. 1951)
- Yury Luzhkov
- Lorin Maazel
- Peter Maffay
- Jean Mandel
- Max Mannheimer
- Ursula Männle
- Hubert Markl
- Hellmuth Matiasek
- Paul Augustin Mayer
- Walther Meissner
- Otto Meitinger
- Maria-Elisabeth Michel-Beyerle
- Joachim Milberg
- Jürgen Mittelstraß
- Walter Mixa
- Martha Mödl
- Jan Mojto
- Alex Möller
- Horst Möller
- Wolf-Dieter Montag
- Hans Müller (politician)
- Gebhard Müller
- Max Müller (Catholic intellectual)
- Thomas Müller
- Ann Murray
- Anne-Sophie Mutter
- Kent Nagano
- Marlene Neubauer-Woerner
- Christine Neubauer
- Manuel Neuer
- Angelika Niebler
- Asha Noppeney
- Theodor Oberländer
- Hermann Oberth
- Carl Orff
- Peter Ostermayr
- Wolfhart Pannenberg
- Paul of Greece
- Max-Josef Pemsel
- Oskar Perron
- Wolfgang Petersen
- Hubertus von Pilgrim
- Susanne Porsche
- Mirjam Pressler
- Otfried Preußler
- Hermann Prey
- Maria Probst
- Karl Pschigode
- Josef Pühringer
- Liselotte Pulver
- Prince Raphael Rainer of Thurn and Taxis
- Georg Ratzinger
- Hanns Reinartz
- Christoph Reiners
- Norbert Reithofer
- Günther Rennert
- Stefan Reuter
- Erich Riedl
- Herbert Rosendorfer
- Marcus H. Rosenmüller
- Philip Rosenthal (industrialist)
- Claudia Roth
- Joseph Rovan
- Sep Ruf
- Ivo Sanader
- Carl Sattler
- Dieter Sattler
- Robert Sauer (mathematician)
- Wolfgang Sawallisch
- Lotte Schädle
- Georg Schäfer
- Anna Schaffelhuber
- Fritz Schäffer
- Franz Schausberger
- Marianne Schech
- Volker Schlöndorff
- Michael Schmaus
- Gerhard Schmidt-Gaden
- Christian Schmidt (politician)
- Horst R. Schmidt
- Heinz Schmidtke
- Franz Schnabel
- Gabriele Schnaut
- Peter Schneider (conductor)
- Hanns-Martin Schneidt
- Jürgen E. Schrempp
- Theobald Schrems
- Wolfgang Schüssel
- Ernst Schwarz (philologist)
- Bastian Schweinsteiger
- Roland Schwing
- Hanna Schygulla
- Hans-Christoph Seebohm
- Horst Seehofer
- Alwin Seifert
- Kurt Semm
- Hans Joachim Sewering
- Ralph Siegel
- Günther Sigl
- Queen Silvia of Sweden
- Erika Simon
- Elke Sommer
- Jutta Speidel
- Friede Springer
- Franz Stadler
- Josef Stangl
- Heinz Starke
- Franz-Ludwig Schenk Graf von Stauffenberg
- Francesco Stefani (film director)
- Gisela Stein
- Erika Steinbach
- Udo Steiner
- Josef Stingl
- Edmund Stoiber
- Franz Josef Strauss
- Florian Streibl
- Max Streibl
- Kurt Suttner
- Peter Tamm
- Jack Terry
- Hans Thamm
- Pierre-Marie Théas
- Heinz Hermann Thiele
- Hertha Töpper
- Luis Trenker
- Konstantinos Tsatsos
- Christian Ude
- Erich Valentin
- Astrid Varnay
- Günter Verheugen
- Michael Verhoeven
- Konstanze Vernon
- Oskar Vierling
- Joseph Vilsmaier
- Rudolf Voderholzer
- Hans-Jochen Vogel
- Kurt Vogel (historian)
- Miriam Vogt
- Karl Vötterle
- Franz Vranitzky
- Hermann Wagner
- Wolfgang Wagner
- Theo Waigel
- Luggi Waldleitner
- Ulrich Walter
- Herbert Walther
- Felix Wankel
- Markus Wasmeier
- Friedrich Weber (general)
- Bernd Weikl
- Grete Weil
- Joseph Wendel
- Friedrich Wetter
- Egon Wiberg
- Bernhard Wicki
- Georg Wieter
- Wolfgang Wild (physicist)
- Ulrich Wilhelm
- Ernst-Ludwig Winnacker
- Fritz Winter
- Notker Wolf
- Hanns Egon Wörlen
- Carl Wurster
- Hans F. Zacher
- Rosel Zech
- Martin Zeil
- Walter Ziegler
- Eduard Zimmermann
- Friedrich Zimmermann
- Tanja Kinkel
