= Uschi Unsinn =

German drag queen, activist, and politician

- Born: Uwe Scherzer; 30 September 1967; Bad Windsheim, West Germany
- Died: 13 February 2022 (aged 54); Nuremberg, Germany
- Occupations: Drag queen; LGBTQ rights activist; politician

Uwe Scherzer (30 September 1967 – 13 February 2022), better known as Uschi Unsinn, was a German drag queen, LGBTQ rights activist, and local politician.

== Life ==
Uschi Unsinn, born Uwe Scherzer, grew up with three older siblings in a Christian family. He initially trained as a retail salesman. Following his faith, he originally wanted to become a deacon and attended the Rummelsberg Diaconal School from 1986. For a preliminary internship, Scherzer went to Ansbach, where he first came into contact with gay men, acknowledged his own homosexuality, and subsequently had to give up his vocational training because of his coming out. Scherzer then initially worked at a gay bar in Nuremberg.

In the late 1980s, he made his first attempts as a drag artist. In the early 1990s, he performed for the first time under the pseudonym "Uschi Unsinn". In 1994, he performed with the Crazy Girls Show Company. In 1997, Uschi Unsinn became a permanent member of the Magic Travestie Cabaret in Fürth. Her first solo program in 1999 was called: "I am not a woman, I am a Miss". (Note: German: Ich bin keine Frau, ich bin ein Fräulein) In 2002, her solo program A bissla ratsch'n followed.

From 2003, Uschi Unsinn appeared as a presenter at gay and lesbian events, including the nationwide Gaychat party tour and the Gaychat24 singles party tour. In 2005, she organized the Christopher Street Day (CSD) street festival in Nuremberg and was one of the co-initiators of the CSD parade in Nuremberg in 2006. From 2006 to 2009, she planned and presented the QueerDance events, including those in Ingolstadt, Regensburg, Passau, Bayreuth, and Aachen. In 2014, she co-founded the "Alliance against Transphobia and Homophobia in the Nuremberg Region", (Note: German: Bündnisses gegen Trans- und Homophobie in der Region Nürnberg) which she spearheaded. From spring 2016 to the end of May 2017, she was the main person responsible for the Kasha for Kenya project, initiated by Kasha Nabagesera, the recipient of the 2013 Nuremberg International Human Rights Award. The project aims to sustainably improve the quality of life for queer refugees from Africa who are stranded in Kenya. From 2019, Uschi Unsinn was an honorary member of the CSD Nuremberg support association. She was also involved with the "AIDS Support Nuremberg Erlangen Fürth" organization for over 15 years.

Since 2013, Scherzer worked as a radio presenter at the community radio station Radio Z in Nuremberg, where he hosted the weekly queer magazine Radio-Gays. From March 2020 until his death, he was a member of the Nuremberg City Council for the Alliance 90/The Greens party, including serving as the party's spokesperson on queer politics. In 2021, following Scherzer's motion in the Nuremberg City Council, the city of Nuremberg introduced a protected queer bathing day for transgender and intersex people.

Uschi Unsinn campaigned for the rights of gay, lesbian, bisexual, transgender, and queer people for over 30 years. She also regularly campaigned against right-wing extremism and racism and advocated for minority rights. In church circles, Scherzer was considered a "bridge builder" and "link" between the Evangelical Lutheran Church in Bavaria and the LGBTQ community. In 2020, he co-organized the exhibition "Gay Suffering in the Flossenbürg Concentration Camp", (Note: German: Schwules Leiden im KZ Flossenbürg) which was shown in St. Giles' Church in Nuremberg. In 2021, Scherzer presented portraits of transgender people in another exhibition at St. Giles' Church.

In 2020, Uschi Unsinn, with her motto "Visibility creates safety", (Note: German: Sichbarkeit schafft Sicherheit) was among the queer personalities presented in the exhibition "Make your town queer!" at the Erlangen City Library. Uschi Unsinn's last public appearance was at the end of January 2022, alongside Ilse Aigner (President of the Bavarian State Parliament) and Karl Freller (Vice President of the Bavarian State Parliament), at the commemoration ceremony for the dedication of the memorial to homosexual victims of Nazi Germany at the Flossenbürg Concentration Camp Memorial, for which she had campaigned.

Uschi Unsinn's commitment was also recognized beyond the region in messages of condolence and obituaries. In addition to Ilse Aigner and Karl Freller, those who expressed their condolences included Member of Parliament Tessa Ganserer, Nuremberg Mayor Marcus König, and Alexander Irmisch, Deputy Federal Chairman of SPDqueer. In honor of Uschi Unsinn, flags were flown at half-staff for three days at Nuremberg City Hall, and a book of condolence was opened.

Scherzer died in the late evening of 13 February 2022, at the age of 54. The public memorial service was held on 19 February 2022, at Christ Church in Nuremberg's southern district. His burial took place at Nuremberg's South Cemetery with over 400 mourners in attendance. Radio Z dedicated a three-hour memorial program to Scherzer in March 2022.
