= Friedrich Högner =

German composer and musicologist

Friedrich Johannes Paul Högner (11 July 1897 − 26 March 1981) was a German organist and church musician.

== Career ==
Born in Oberwaldbehrungen, today Ostheim, Högner was the son of the Protestant pastor Andreas Högner and his wife Mathilde, née Städler. He attended the Gymnasium Carolinum (Ansbach), then the Lehrerseminar in Altdorf and finally studied music at the University of Music and Performing Arts Munich, Erlangen and Leipzig. As a student he became a member of the Erlanger Wingolf and the Leipziger Wingolf.

From 1922 he was cantor for three years in Gohlis (Leipzig). At the same time he was musical director at the St. Thomas School, Leipzig and in 1924 he took over the representation of Karl Straube at the conservatory.

In 1925, Högner went to Regensburg as city cantor and Kirchenmusikdirektor. in Roma Quanta fuit. Wißner Augsburg, 2010, ISBN 978-3-89639-799-7, pp. 667–668]. In 1929 he returned to the Leipzig Conservatory as an organ teacher. There he was organist at the Paulinerkirche and was appointed professor at the Church Music Institute in 1934. From 1937 to 1965 he was the regional church music director of the Evangelical Lutheran Church in Bavaria. From 1959 he was also professor at the Staatliche Hochschule für Musik in Munich and head of the department for church music.

== Bell expert ==
- His name is mentioned on the homepage of the Kaiser Wilhelm Memorial Church in the context of his work as a bell expert: "...The board of trustees of the foundation Kaiser-Wilhelm-Gedächtniskirche decided in its meeting on July 8, 1959, to use the tone sequence Gº Bº C' D' D` Es' F', which had been proposed independently by several experts. Wolfgang Reimann and Friedrich Högner had also pleaded for this tone sequence, which best met the different requirements...".

== Jury member ==
- In 1970 he was jury member of the international organ competition at the MAfestival Brügge in Bruges.

== Trivia ==
Högner had no driver's license. So he travelled around by train or had relatives take him to his destination. If, for example, as a bell expert he had his bell testing instruments with him, he had to carry the heavy bag with him.

Högner died in Munich at the age of 83.

== Honours ==
- 1955: Order of Merit of the Federal Republic of Germany
- Bavarian Order of Merit.

== Literature ==
- Friedrich Herzfeld (ed.): Das Neue Ullstein Lexikon der Musik. Ullstein, Frankfurt [et al.] 1993.
- Bernhard A. Kohl in Das Große Lexikon der Musik. Volume 4, p. 108. Freiburg in Br. 1981 [et al.]
