= Gisela Anton =

German physicist (born 1955)

- Born: Gisela Glasmachers; 27 March 1955 (age 71); Bullay, Rhineland-Palatinate, Germany
- Education: University of Bonn
- Spouse: Frank Anton
- Children: 3
- Awards: Leibniz Prize (1994); Federal Cross of Merit (1995); Bavarian Order of Merit (2009); Bavarian Maximilian Order for Science and Art (2010)
- Scientific career
- Fields: Astroparticle physics
- Workplaces: University of Bonn; University of Erlangen–Nuremberg
- Thesis: Target Asymmetry Measurement of the Deuteron Photofission at a Photon Energy of 550-Mev and Proton Center-of-Mass Angle Between 25-Degrees and 135-Degrees (1983)

Gisela Anton (born Gisela Glasmachers; 27 March 1955 in Bullay) is a German experimental particle and astroparticle physicist. She was awarded the Gottfried Wilhelm Leibniz Prize in 1994. Since 1995, she is a professor and Chair of Experimental Physics at the University of Erlangen–Nuremberg.

== Early life and education ==
Anton began studying physics in at the University of Bonn in 1973. In 1975, she entered and won the Bundessieger Jugend forscht (National Youth Research Competition). After earning her Ph.D. in 1983, she worked at the Physics Institute at the University of Bonn from 1984 to 1995, but also engaged in research work in Saclay (1990–1991) and Mainz (1991–1992). In 1993, she habilitated at the University of Bonn. Since 1995, she is Chair of Experimental Physics at the University of Erlangen–Nuremberg.

== Career and research ==
Anton's career has included working in the field of high-energy physics and the ELSA Particle Accelerator in Bonn and designing the Amadeus detector. For this work, she was awarded the Gottfried Wilhelm Leibniz Prize (1994) and the Bundesverdienstkreuz (Federal Cross of Merit) (1995). She studied baryon resonances by real photons.

In 2005, Anton explored acoustic sensors for the ANTARES neutrino telescope. Her research focuses on neutrino experiments such as ANTARES/KM3net, IceCube, and EXO-200. She is also doing applied research in the medical field on the Medipix detectors.

Anton is the founder of the Erlangen Center for Astroparticle Physics (ECAP). She is also working with the ErlangerSchülerForschungsZentrum für Bayern (ESFZ), the Erlangen Student Research Center for Bavaria.

In 2005, Anton delivered the Emmy Noether Lecture at the University of Erlangen–Nuremberg.

== Awards ==
- Bundessieger Jugend forscht (National Youth Research Competition, 1st Place Winner, 1975)
- Gottfried Wilhelm Leibniz Prize, 1994
- Bundesverdienstkreuz am Bande (Federal Cross of Merit, 1995)
- Preis für gute Lehre des Bayerischen Staatsministeriums für Wissenschaft, Forschung und Kunst (Prize for good teaching of the Bavarian State Ministry of Sciences, Research and the Arts, 2000)
- Bayerischer Verdienstorden (Bavarian Order of Merit, 2009)
- Bayerischer Maximiliansorden für Wissenschaft und Kunst (Bavarian Maximilian Order for Science and Art, 2010)

== Personal life ==
Gisela met her husband Frank Anton at the Bundessieger Jugend forscht (National Youth Research Competition) in 1975 and was later married in 1979.
