= Roland Schwing =

Roland Schwing (born 19 April 1949 in Röllbach, † 3 October 2017 in South Tyrol) was a German local politician. From 1986 to 2014 he was district administrator of the Lower Franconian district of Miltenberg.

== Life ==
After graduating from high school, Schwing studied economics at the University of Karlsruhe. After graduating as an industrial engineer in 1974, he joined his parents company as a general manager.

In 1969, he joined the Junge Union and the CSU, which began his political work. In the Junge Union he had the position of district chairman and the vice district chair. In 1976, he became a member of the board of the district association of Lower Franconia, in his party. In the 1984 municipal elections of the district Mittenberg, he participated for the first time as a member of the district council. From 1 November 1986 to 1 May 2014 he was a district administrator, after which he took over the post of Jens Marco Scherf (Alliance 90/The Greens). In May 2002, he was elected vice president of the Bavarian County Association.

On the 3 of October 2017, Schwing died at the age of 68 during a vacation in South Tyrol.

== Awards ==
- 2000: Ribbon Cross of Merit of the Order of Merit from the Federal Republic of Germany
- 2005: Municipal Medal of Merit in silver
- 2007: Bavarian Order of Merit
- 2010: Bavarian Constitutional Medal in silver
