= Thomas M. J. Möllers =

German legal scholar

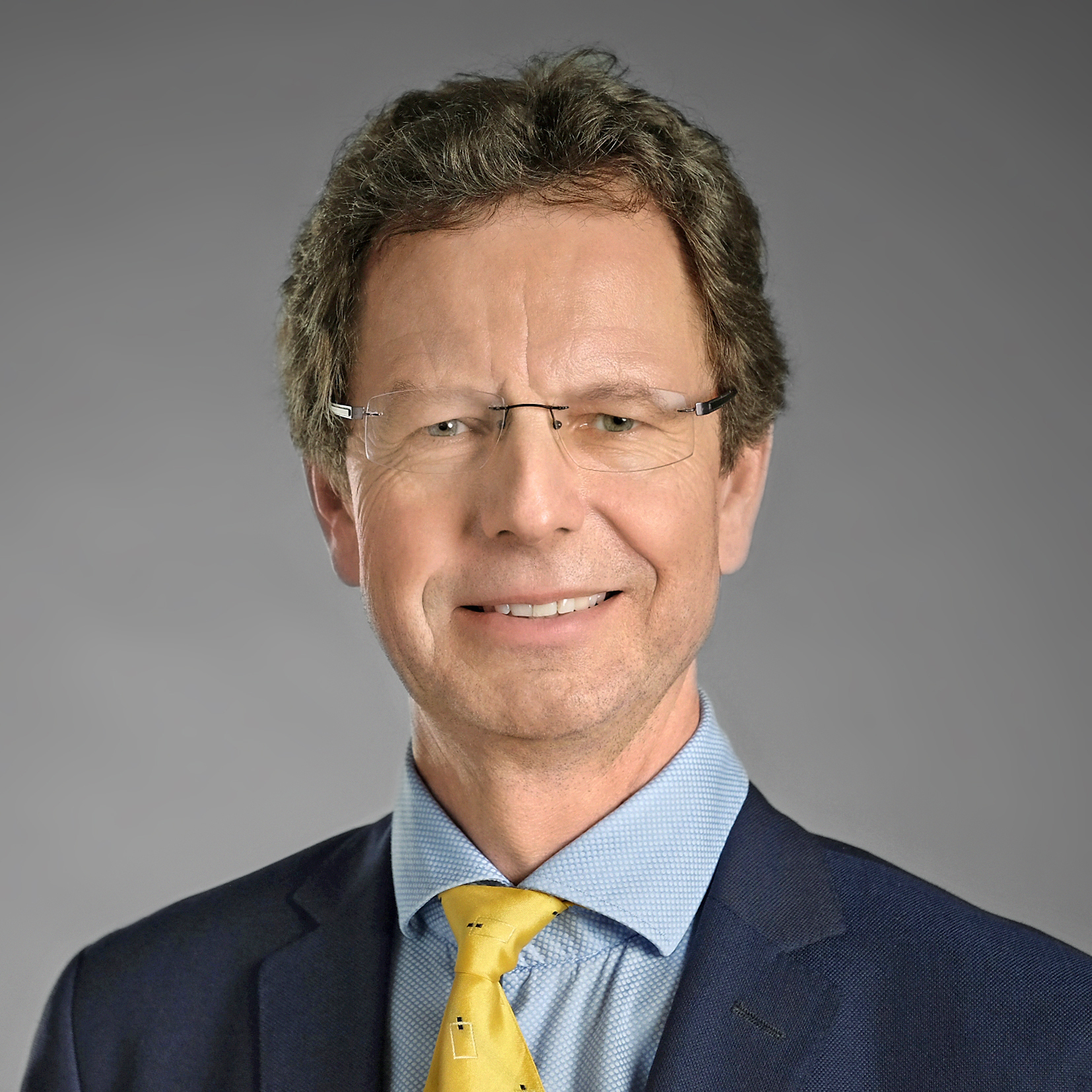
Thomas M.J. Möllers (2019)

Thomas M. J. Möllers (born 25 January 1962 in Mainz) is a German legal scholar, focusing on capital markets law.

== Academic life ==
Möllers studied law in Mainz and Dijon. He conducted research for his doctorate under Walther Hadding and for his habilitation under Wolfgang Fikentscher. During this time he was a visiting scholar at the University of California, Berkeley and at the European University Institute in Florence. After his habilitation on the subject of "Legal protection in environmental and liability Law". at LMU Munich, Möllers became a full professor of civil law, commercial law, European law, international private law, and comparative law at the Faculty of Law at the University of Augsburg on 1 July 1996.

Möllers has held visiting and research professorships at several universities among others in Sydney, Pittsburgh, North Carolina at Chapel Hill, Pepperdine, Hobart, Washington, D.C., Beijing, Changsha, Wuhan, Lyon, and Lanzhou.

== Work ==
Möllers has helped shape European capital markets law with more than 500 publications. Within these he has discussed topics such as the investigated economic scandals involving Volkswagen and Wirecard. More recently, Möllers has been working on sustainability in capital markets law and the interactions between psychology, environmental and capital markets law.

He is most known for his publication Juristische Methodenlehre (Legal Methods), which has been translated to English in 2020 and Chinese in 2022. Möllers' work also focuses on legal working techniques. In 2001 his book Juristische Arbeitstechnik und wissenschaftliches Arbeiten (Legal Working Technique and Academic Work) was first published and developed standards for the academic work of lawyers. When the plagiarism of former German Defense Minister zu Guttenberg was uncovered, these standards were being used as a guideline.

== Functions and honors ==
- since 2024: Honorary professor at the Central South University, Changsha, Hunan, China.
- 2016-2020: Jean Monnet Center of Excellence at the University of Augsburg "European Integration - Rule of Law and Enforcement (INspiRE)".
- Awarded the Ad Personam Jean Monnet Chair by the European Commission in 2010, and in 2005, a Jean Monnet Chair for European corporate, capital markets and competition law by the EU Commission.
- Chairman of the Board of Trustees of the Deutsche Bundesbank's Money and Currency Foundation since 1 July 2015, and a permanent member of the Board of Trustees since 2009.
- Member of the Advisory Board of the Munich Intellectual Property Law Center (MIPLC).

== Selected publications ==
- Möllers, Juristische Methodenlehre. 6th ed. C.H.Beck, München 2025, ISBN 978-3-406-82745-7. English translation of the 2nd ed.: Hart Publishing, Oxford u.a. 2020, ISBN 978-3-406-74397-9. Chinese translation of the 4th ed.: Peking University Press, Peking 2022, ISBN 978-7-301-33042-5.
- Möllers, Juristische Arbeitstechnik und wissenschaftliches Arbeiten. 11th ed. Vahlen, München 2024, ISBN 978-3-8006-7393-3. Chinese translation of the 9th and 10th ed.: Peking University Press, ISBN 978-7-301-30286-6.
- Möllers, Thomas; Gsell, Beate, Enforcing Consumer and Capital Market Law in Europe. The Diesel Emissions Scandal, Intersentia, Cambridge 2020, ISBN 978-1-78068-964-7.
- Möllers, Thomas; Hirte Heribert, Kölner Kommentar zum WpHG. 2nd ed. Carl Heymanns, 2013, ISBN 978-3-452-27587-5.
