= Maria-Elisabeth Michel-Beyerle =

German chemist (born 1935)

- Born: 20 August 1935 (age 91); Kiel, Germany
- Education: University of Göttingen; Ludwig-Maximilians-Universität München; RWTH Aachen University
- Known for: Photosynthesis
- Awards: Bavarian Order of Merit
- Scientific career
- Fields: Physics, Chemistry, Biophysics
- Workplaces: Technical University of Munich
- Website: portal.mytum.de/forschung/eoe/profile/michel-beyerle/index_html

Maria-Elisabeth Michel-Beyerle (born 20 August 1935 in Kiel, Germany) is a German chemist. From 1974 to 2000, she was a professor of Physical Chemistry at the Technical University of Munich. Among other awards, she has received the 2000 Bavarian Order of Merit (Bayerischer Verdienstorden), the highest service order bestowed by the Free State of Bavaria, for her work on photosynthesis.

== Early life ==
On 20 August 1935 Michel-Beyerle was born in Kiel, Germany. Michel-Beyerle's father was Konrad Beyerle, an engineer.

== Education and career ==
Michel-Beyerle studied chemistry at the University of Göttingen. From 1957 to 1959, she studied at the Ludwig-Maximilians-Universität München. From 1960 to 1962, she was a graduate assistant at the Institute of Inorganic Chemistry at RWTH Aachen University. In 1964, she completed her doctoral thesis, Zur Elektrochemie des Indiums, on the electrochemistry of indium.

From 1965 to 1974, Michel-Beyerle worked as a research assistant at the Institute of Physical Chemistry at the Technical University of Munich, working with Heinz Gerischer. In 1974 she achieved her Habilitation, qualifying as a professor and being appointed to the Chair of Physical Chemistry at the Technical University of Munich. In 1980, she was recognized as a Professor extraordinarius. Michel-Beyerle became a Professor emeritus in 2000.

She has been the founder and spokesperson for two Collaborative Research Centres, one for “Elementary processes of photosynthesis” (1981–1996) and one for “Photoionisation and charge transfer in large molecules, clusters and in the condensation phase“ (1994–2000). From 2003 to 2007, she has been the project coordinator of the EU research program for "Control of assembly and charge transport dynamics of immobilized DNA" (CIDNA).

In 2008, she became a visiting professor at Nanyang Technological University in the city state of Singapore. In 2009, she became the founding director of BioFemtoLab, a research unit at Nanyang Technological University.

== Research ==
Michel-Beyerle's area of research is physical chemistry. She is known for her work on electron transfer dynamics in biological systems, including the influence of magnetic fields on chemical reactions such as the spin dynamics of radicals, and the use of MARY-spectroscopy (Magnetic Field Effect on Reaction Yield) to study structural and dynamic properties of the reaction centre. She has examined the structure of the photosynthetic reaction center in bacteria. Her work with Johann Deisenhofer and Hartmut Michel informed their understanding of unidirectional electron transfer, contributing to their winning of the Nobel Prize in chemistry for determining the three-dimensional structure of the photosynthetic reaction center. She is particularly interested in disorder phenomena and the control of disorder-order transitions. She was the first to identify very rapid transmembrane electron transfers and examine their energetics. As early as 1968 she studied the ability of illuminated organic dyes to generate electricity in electrochemical cells, and has continued to work on the development of dye-sensitized solar cells. Her studies of the structure-based dynamics of DNA and proteins include the green fluorescent protein (GFP) of the jellyfish Aequorea victoria.

== Honors and awards ==
- 2000, Bavarian Order of Merit (Bayerischer Verdienstorden), highest service order bestowed by the Free State of Bavaria
- 2006, Bavarian Maximilian Order for Science and Art (Bayerischer Maximiliansorden für Wissenschaft und Kunst), for those "who have set new standards with their lifetime achievement in science and art".
- 2009, Bavarian Constitutional Medal, (Bayerische Verfassungsmedaille), Silver
- 2013, Heinz Maier-Leibnitz-Medaille from the Technical University of Munich

== See also ==
- Roger Y. Tsien (known for GFP and calcium imaging)
