= Eva-Maria Beck-Meuth =

German university president

- Born: Eva-Maria Beck
- Education: Ludwig-Maximilians-Universität München, Rheinische Friedrich-Wilhelms-Universität Bonn
- Known for: President of TH Aschaffenburg, promotion of women in STEM education and business
- Awards: Bavarian Constitution Medal
- Scientific career
- Fields: Physics
- Workplaces: Alexander von Humboldt Foundation, Deutsche Telekom, TH Aschaffenburg
- Thesis: Nuclear shapes at very high spins, an experimental study in rare-earth nuclei
- Website: www.th-ab.de/hochschule/organisation/person/prof-dr-eva-maria-beck-meuth

Eva-Maria Beck-Meuth is a German physicist and academic administrator serving as the president of the TH Aschaffenburg since 2019. TH Aschaffenburg is a Technische Hochschule (university of applied science) in Aschaffenburg, Germany, and is one of Germany's youngest TH universities (founded 1995).

== Professional life ==
Eva-Maria Beck-Meuth studied Physics at the Ludwig-Maximilians-Universität München during 1979–1984, and graduated with a Diplom (German qualification similar to a Master's). After graduating, she moved to Lawrence Berkeley National Laboratory at the University of California, Berkeley. After two years, she returned to Germany, and obtained her doctorate in Experimental Physics from the Rheinische Friedrich-Wilhelms-Universität Bonn in 1988. Her thesis was entitled "Nuclear shapes at very high spins, an experimental study in rare-earth nuclei".

After completing her PhD and before returning to academia, she worked for several years at the Alexander von Humboldt Foundation in Bonn, Deutsche Telekom in Darmstadt, and Alcatel Space Operations in Darmstadt.

She was appointed professor in the Faculty of Engineering at TH Aschaffenburg in 2002. Her transition from research and teaching to university administration began with her appointment as Dean of the Faculty of Engineering and Computer Science in 2011. In 2013, she became the University's Vice President for Studies, Teaching and International Affairs, and in 2019, she was elected president. In addition to teaching at Aschaffenburg, she has also taught summer courses, including at Universität Bremen.

Beck-Meuth's appointment to president (on March 15, 2019) coincided with the renaming of the university from Hochschule für angewandte Wissenschaften (University of applied science) to TH Aschaffenburg. Her predecessor in the position was Wilfried Diwischek In 2024, she was reelected to a further six year term.

During Beck-Meuth's tenure, the number of students has increased to about 3,500, and a new midwifery program has been launched. In the fall of 2025, a new degree program in social work will begin.

== Personal life ==
Beck-Meuth is an alumna of the Studienstiftung. She has three adult children.

== Awards and honors ==
- 2023 Bavarian Constitution Medal for her contributions to STEM and recruitment of women to STEM fields
