= Gisela Ehrensperger =

Swiss singer (born 1943)

Gisela Ehrensperger née Gisela Heuzeroth (born 10 August 1943) is a Swiss opera/operetta/musical theatre soprano. For 40 years, she was a permanent member of the ensemble of the Staatstheater am Gärtnerplatz, Munich.

== Life and career ==
Born in Wiesbaden, Ehrensperger was a pupil of the singing teacher Sofia Husi. She made her debut at Staatstheater in St. Gallen in 1965 in the role of Musetta in La Bohème. Two years later the soprano was engaged by the Staatstheater am Gärtnerplatz. During her 40 years on stage there, she performed leading roles (about 150) of genres: Mimi in Puccini's La Bohème, Pamina in Mozart's The Magic Flute, Micaela in Bizet's Carmen, Antonia in The Tales of Hoffmann, the Marschallin of Luxembourg in Gräfin Dubarry, Agricola in A Night in Venice, Palmyra in The Opera Ball, Praskowia in The Merry Widow, Wilhelmine in The Cousin from Dingsda, among others.

Ehrensperger sang the aging folk music singer Margot at the Theater am Gärtnerplatz in the premiere of the new version of the short operetta Die Ländler-Queen sieht Morgenrot (1 February 1997), music and text by Georg Ringsgwandl, also in the world premiere of the opera Lebensregeln (27 August 1972) by Gerhard Wimberger and on Radio Zurich in the world premiere of the opera Der Alchimist (1969) by Max Lang. Television and radio versions of the latter two productions were recorded.

Ehrensperger could also be seen in several musicals. For example, at the Luisenburg Festival in Wunsiedel (2005) she played Golde, milkman Tevje's wife, in Fiddler on the Roof and in the Theater am Gärtnerplatz (1981) Mary Ann in the musical Casanova by Helmut Bez and Jürgen Degenhardt.

She gave her official farewell performance in Munich Countess Mariza on 16 June 2007. Ehrensperger is an honorary member of the Staatstheater am Gärtnerplatz due to her special performances.

In the 2007/2008 season she gave a guest performance at the Graz Opera as the Princess in the operetta Countess Mariza.

In the 2012/2013 season of the Staatstheater am Gärtnerplatz, Ehrensperger appeared in the role of Fräulein Schneider in the musical Cabaret.

== Awards ==
- Kammersänger, the youngest in Bavaria (1974)
- Bundesverdienstkreuz am Bande (14 April 1994)
- Bayerischer Verdienstorden (1999)

== Discography ==
- Goldene Operette: Pariser Leben (Telefunken 1979)
- Goldene Operette: Die Fledermaus (Telefunken 1976)
- Goldene Operette: Der Vetter aus Dingsda (Telefunken 1977)
- Goldene Operette: Saison in Salzburg (Telefunken 1977)

== Literature ==
- Karl-Josef Kutsch, Leo Riemens: Großes Sängerlexikon. First volume: A–L. Bern/Stuttgart 1987, p. 830.
- Andreas Kotte, ed. (2005). "Gisela Ehrensperger". Theaterlexikon der Schweiz / Dictionnaire du théâtre en Suisse / Dizionario Teatrale Svizzero / Lexicon da teater svizzer [Theater Dictionary of Switzerland]. Vol. 1. Zürich: Chronos. p. 521. ISBN 978-3-0340-0715-3. LCCN 2007423414. OCLC 62309181.
