= Joseph Rovan =

French philosopher and politician (1918–2004)

Joseph Adolphe Rovan (born Joseph Adolph Rosenthal in Munich, Germany on 25 July 1918; died 27 July 2004) was a French philosopher and politician, and is considered a spiritual father of post-war Europe. Initially born into the Jewish faith, on Whitsunday 1944 he was received into the Catholic Church.

Rovan was active in the French Resistance during World War II and was awarded the Croix de Guerre and the Médaille de la Résistance for his services. In 1944, he was arrested by the Gestapo and survived 10 months in the Dachau concentration camp. It was during this time that he converted to Catholicism. In 1945, after his return to France, he wrote in the magazine Esprit the article "L'Allemagne de nos mérites," where he suggested that the creation of a democratic Germany on the ruins of the Third Reich was the responsibility of the Allies.

Rovan has also been awarded the Legion d'Honneur, the Ordre National du Mérite, the German Order of Merit with Star, and the Bavarian Order of Merit. He died in a swimming accident in France.
