= Landeskirchenamt München =

Coordinates: 48°08′40″N 11°33′55″E

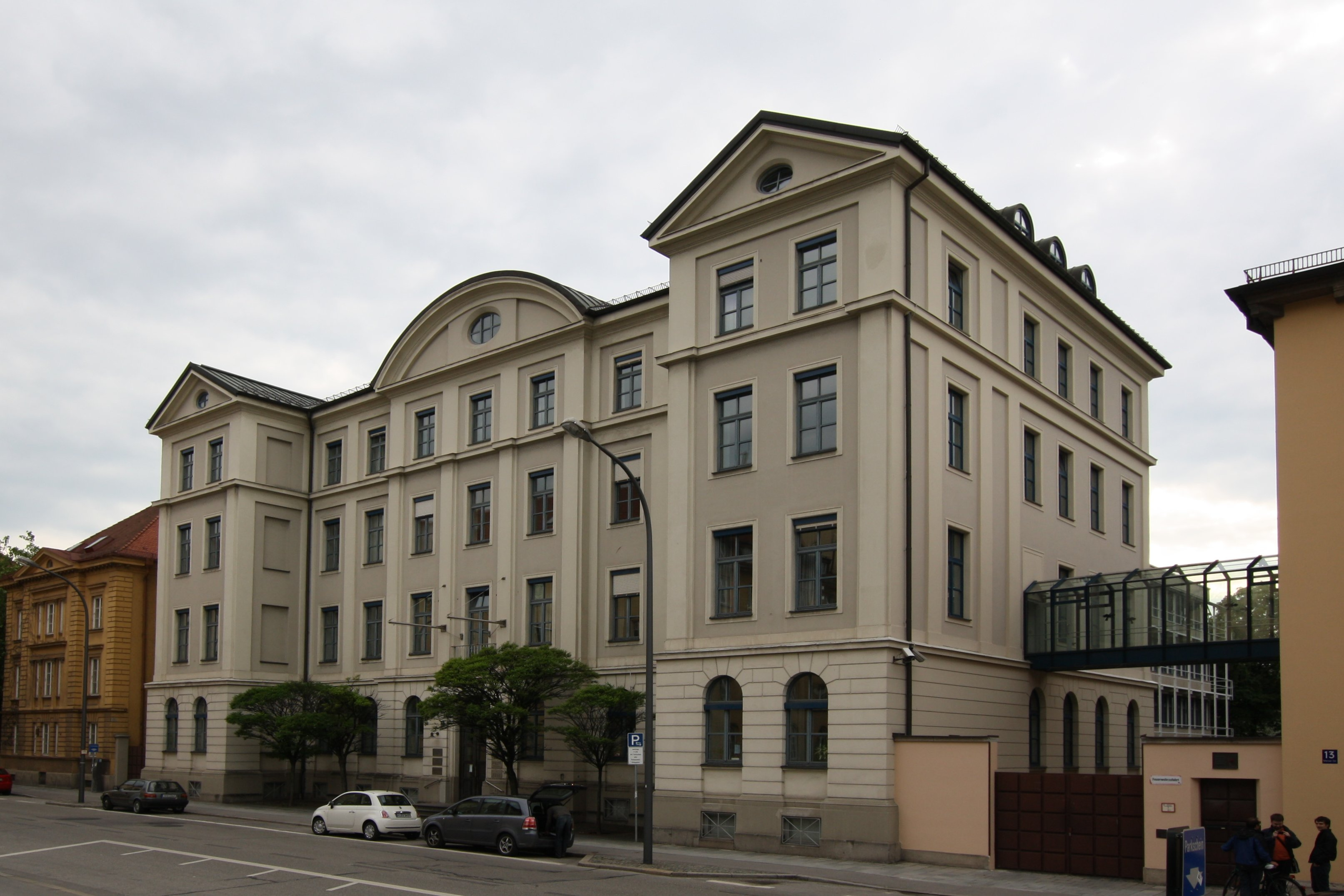
The Church Office in Katharina-von-Bora-Straße, Munich

The Landeskirchenamt München (i.e. Church Office) is the administrative headquarters of the Evangelical Lutheran Church in Bavaria. The building is located in the Maxvorstadt, Munich, Bavaria, Germany.
