= Jean Mandel =

German politician (1911-1974)

Member of the Bavarian Senate
- In office 1 January 1964 – 25 December 1974

Personal details
- Born: 20 September 1911 Fürth, Germany
- Died: 25 December 1974 (aged 63)
Association football career
Senior career*
Years	Team	Apps	(Gls)
- SpVgg Greuther Fürth
- * Club domestic league appearances and goals

Jean Mandel (20 September 1911 – 25 December 1974) was a member of the Bavarian Senate, a football player, and co-founder of the Organization of Jewish Communities in Bavaria.

== Early years ==
Mandel was born in 1911 in Fürth, where he attended the Jewish high school and afterward a trade school in Nuremberg. He was also a player for SpVgg Greuther Fürth, a career that ended after a severe motorcycle accident. He later worked for a hops distributor. He and his brother began a textile business, which was destroyed in Kristallnacht.

== World War II ==
On 28 October 1938, Mandel was deported to Poland where he settled in Lemberg (now Lviv, Ukraine). In March 1939, he returned for two months to Fürth. During the German occupation of Poland in World War II, Mandel moved among various hiding places in Lviv. When Lviv was captured in 1944 by the Red Army, the Soviet secret police interned Mandel as a suspected Western spy. After a short stay in the DP camp in Zettwitz, Mandel returned to Fürth in the summer of 1945 to rebuild his company. In addition to Rabbi David Spiro, Mandel was the driving force of re-establishing Fürth's Jewish community, whose chairman he remained until his death.

== Career ==
Mandel was also a founding member of the Society for Christian-Jewish Cooperation in Nuremberg and its Jewish chairman. From 1946, he founded the National Association of Jewish Communities in Bavaria and was its vice-president. Between 1957 and 1974 he was chairman of the National Committee. From 1 January 1964 until his death he was a senator in the Bavarian Senate. From 1971, Mandel was a member of the executive board of the Central Council of Jews in Germany.

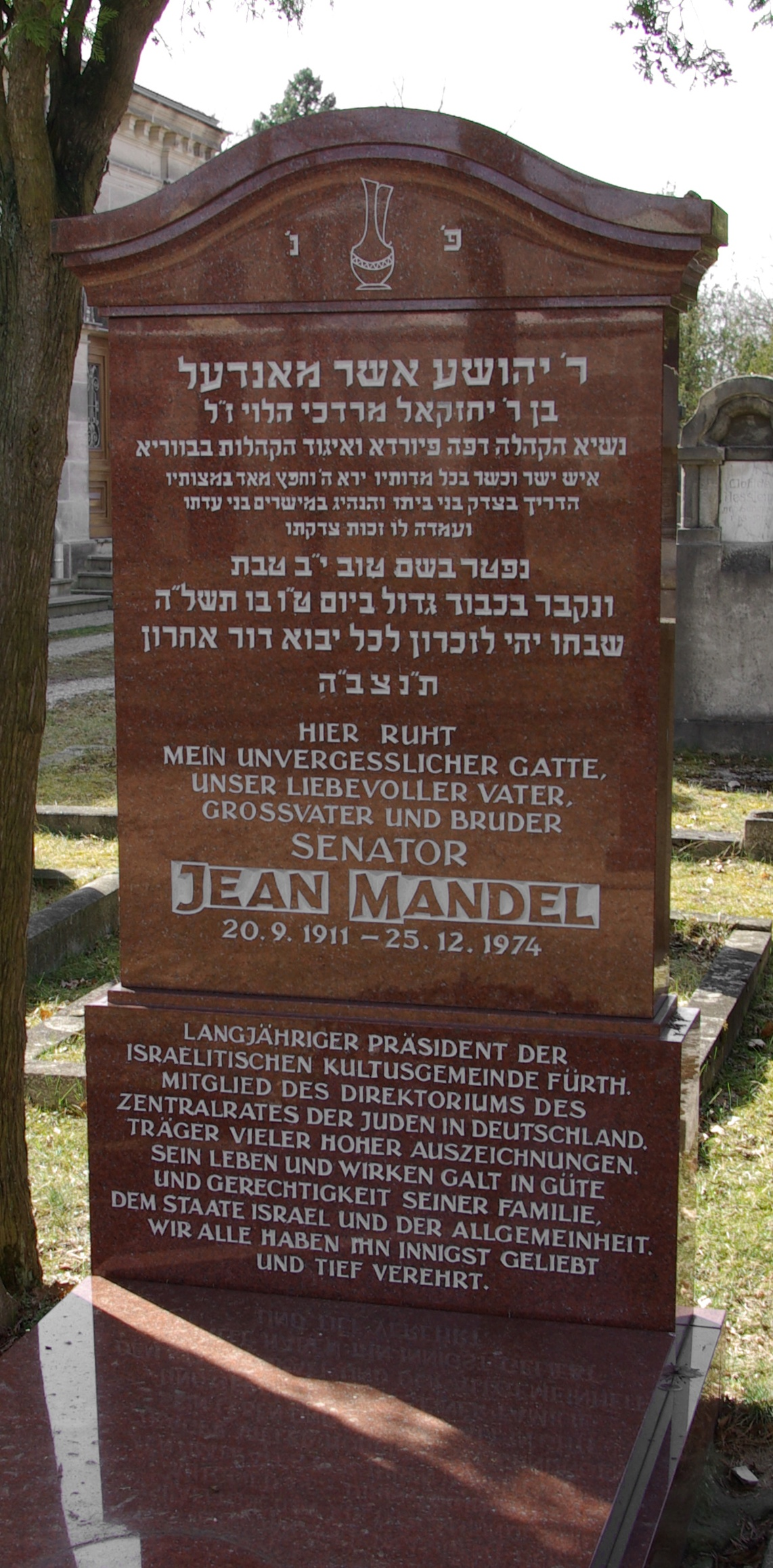
Mandel's grave

Mandel died 25 December 1974 and is buried in Fürth's new Jewish Cemetery.

== Memorial ==
On 5 May 2018, Jean Mandel and his brother Leo were honored in Fürth, Germany with the placement of a memorial plate. Their names were inscribed on a plate that is located at Marktplatz 10 on the Green Market and in Königswarterstraße 64. The ceremony was attended by some of the Mandel's remaining family and by the Mayor of Fürth, Thomas Jung.

== Awards ==
In 1956, Jean Mandel received the Order of Merit of the Federal Republic of Germany. In 1973, Jean Mandel received the Bavarian Order of Merit.

== Literature ==
- Helga Schmöger (ed., et al.): Der Bayerische Senat. Biographisch-statistisches Handbuch 1947–1997, Düsseldorf, Droste-Verlag, 1998, p. 216 et seq. (Handbücher zur Geschichte des Parlamentarismus und der politischen Parteien; Band 10) ISBN 3-7700-5207-2
