= Hermann Wagner =

Hermann Wagner (born May 20, 1941) is a German scientist in the field of microbiology and immunology and past Dean of the Medical Faculty of the Technical University of Munich (TUM). His massive number of published works, at over 370, makes him one of Europe's most cited immunologists.

== Curriculum Vitae ==
Wagner studied Medicine and in 1967 received his medical degree (MD) from the University of Tübingen. In Melbourne, Australia he studied Human Biology and in 1973 received his PhD from University of Melbourne. From 1973 to 1983 he continued his research on "T Cell mediated Immune Responses" with Paul Klein at the Institut of Microbiology of the Johannes-Gutenberg University in Mainz, Germany. In 1978, he qualified as a university lecturer (habilitation), and in 1983 he was made full professor and head of the Institut of Microbiology at the University of Ulm. In 1989, he moved to the Technical University of Munich, where he headed the Institute of Medical Microbiology, Immunology and Hygiene. He retired at the end of 2008.

== Research work ==
His prime research activities focus on mechanisms of protective immunity towards pathogens. From 1970-80 he analysed T-T Cell interactions during the induction of cytotoxic T Cell responses. During his Ulm period he focussed on the immunobiology of bacterial superantigens. In Munich, he subsequently contributed to our understanding of Toll-like-Receptors(TLR), through which innate immune cells sense pathogens. In particular he was one of the first to realise that bacterial/viral DNA activated Innate Immune cells via TLR9. Conversely his group was able to show that TLR7 and/or TLR8 recognised pathogen-derived RNA while TLR13 senses bacterial 23S rRNA.

In Ulm he initiated and headed the Collaborative Research Program of the German Research Council (Sonderforschungsbereich) entitled "Lympo-Haemopoese". In Munich he expanded the research area "Infection and Immunity" to a major research focus of his faculty. He co-initiated three Collaborative Research Programs and was from 1999-2006 speaker of the program "Target structures for selective Tumor-Interventions".

His honorary functions include: Presidency of the German Society of Immunology, Dean of the Faculty of Medicine (TUM), and Chairmen of the Science Advisory Board-IZKF-University Würzburg. A number of his pupills (n=13) are now heading university departments or other science-institutions; hence, Wagner and his pupills operate a creative academic school in Germany.

== Honors and awards ==
In 1988 Wagner received the Behring-Kitasato Prize from the Hoechst Japan, and in 2001 he was awarded an honorary doctorate by the University of Würzburg. In 2003 he received the "Order of Merit" of the Federal Republic of Germany. He has been an honorary member of the German Society of Immunology since 2007. He received the "Bavarian Order of Merit" in 2007. He is member of the Bavarian Academy of Sciences and the German Academy of Sciences Leopoldina. In 2009 he was Fellow of the A. Krupp Science Foundation in Greifswald/Baltic Sea, and in 2012 guest professor at the University of Marburg. Since 2011 he is TUM-Emeritus of Excellence. In 2013 he was awarded an honorary degree by the University of Bonn.
