= Eva Umlauf =

Slovak-German paediatrician, psychotherapist, and Holocaust survivor

- Born: 19 December 1942 (age 83); Nováky, Slovakia
- Education: Comenius University, Bratislava
- Occupations: Paediatrician and psychotherapist
- Children: 3
- Awards: Bayerischer Verfassungsorden (2025)
- Website: www.eva-umlauf.de

Eva Umlauf (née Hecht; (Note: Slovak: Hechtová) born 19 December 1942) is a Slovak-German paediatrician and psychotherapist who was one of the youngest people to survive Auschwitz concentration camp. Born in a Nováky labour camp, she was imprisoned in Auschwitz from her deportation before the age of two until after its liberation by the Red Army; she was one of only a few Slovaks to survive Auschwitz. After recovering in Czechoslovakia she became a doctor and moved to Munich, Germany.

After the Holocaust, Umlauf had a career as a paediatrician and psychotherapist. She chose to share her Holocaust story after a heart attack in 2014. Her memoir, Die Nummer auf deinem Unterarm ist blau wie deine Augen (The Number On Your Forearm Is Blue Like Your Eyes), was published in 2016. In 2024, Die Perfekte Zeugin ('The Perfect Witness'), Timofey Neshitov's interview of her for Der Spiegel, won the Egon Erwin Kisch Prize. She was elected President of the International Auschwitz Committee in 2025.

== Life during World War II ==
=== Imprisonment ===
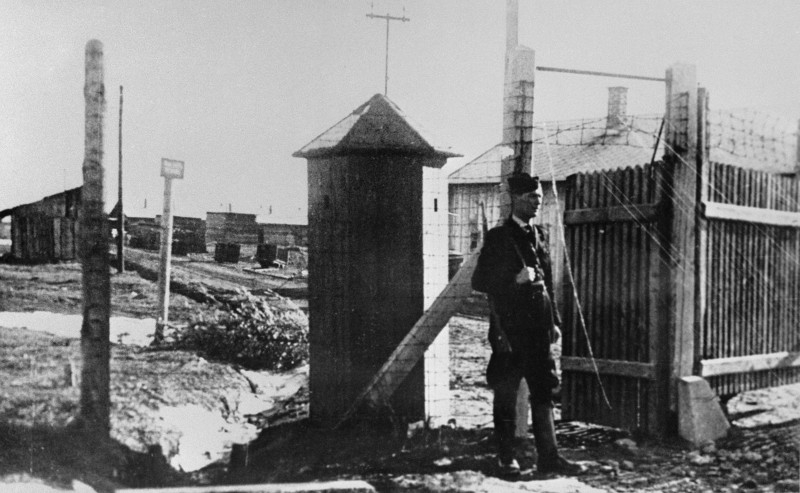
The Nováky labour camp where Umlauf was born

Umlauf was born on 19 December 1942 in a labour camp in Nováky, Slovakia, which served as a transit camp from which people of Jewish background were deported to extermination camps in Poland. While in the camp, her father Imrich Hecht worked as an accountant, and her mother Agnes (née Eisler) worked as a tailor. The couple had married hoping it would prevent their deportation, but after the Slovak National Uprising, the family fled to Piešťany, and upon their discovery they were sent to Sereď concentration camp. The family were then deported to Auschwitz concentration camp on the final train from Sereď. By that time, Agnes was four months pregnant.

Extermination by gas had been discontinued at Auschwitz on 31 October 1944, the day after a thousand mothers and their childre had been gassed after arriving from the Theresienstadt Ghetto; Umlauf and her mother therefore avoided being killed upon their arrival on 2 November. In spite of the ensuing chaos of the Nazi retreat, Umlauf was still numerically tattooed A26959. She was unconscious during this procedure, and has never decided to have the tattoo removed. In an interview with The Guardian, Umlauf said she was "probably" the last child to be tattooed at Auschwitz and then survive to its liberation. Umlauf's father, aged 33, was deported from Auschwitz to Melk concentration camp, a sub-camp of Mauthausen concentration camp, on 20 January 1945. He was sent there on a death march, before being killed at Melk in March 1945. (Note: NeverAgain suggests he died during the death march. Jüdische Allgemeine suggests he died on 20 March, whereas B5-aktuell suggests he died on 21 March.) The last time Umlauf saw her father was upon their arrival at Auschwitz from Sereď.

Die Nazis wollten noch alles vertuschen. Es gab weiterhin Todesmärsche, bei einem solchen ist mein Vater erschossen worden. Aber vergast haben sie nicht mehr, weil sie wussten, dass das Ende naht. Sie wollten das Archivmaterial vernichten, aber es war zu spät.

The Nazis still wanted to cover everything up. There were more and more death marches, in one of which my father was shot. But they didn't gas people any more, because they knew, that the end was drawing near. They wanted to destroy the archive material, but it was too late.

— Umlauf in 2011

=== Liberation and recovery ===
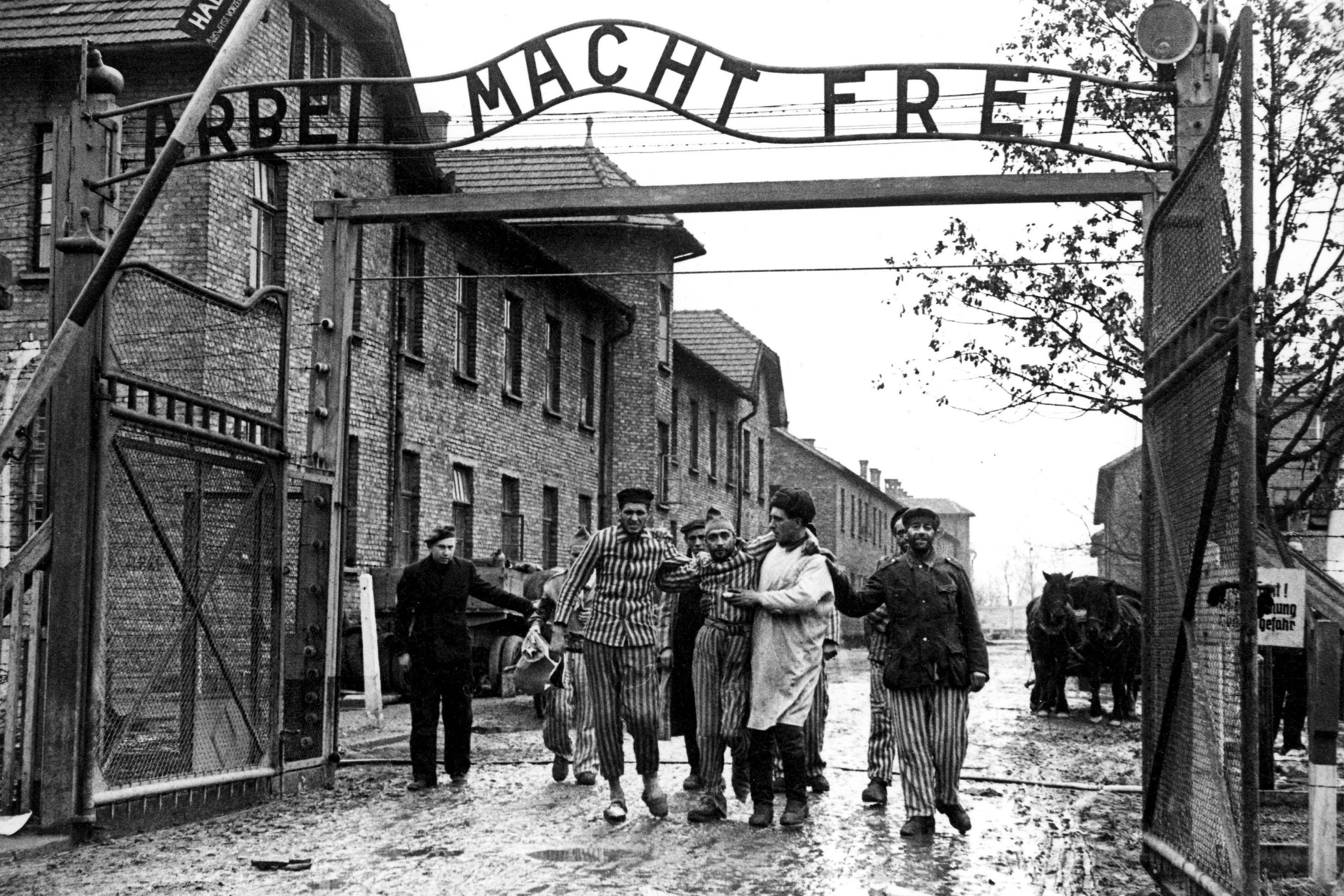
The liberation of Auschwitz in January 1945

Umlauf and her mother stayed at Auschwitz from its liberation by the Red Army on 27 January 1945 for a few weeks because they were too ill to travel. They were both malnourished and suffering from with rickets and tuberculosis, and her mother was also pregnant and jaundiced. During this time, Umlauf's mother was told by a doctor that both she and her unborn daughter would not survive. The doctor was proven wrong as she did survive, and her daughter Eleonora (Nora) was born healthy in the camp in April 1945.

When the rest of the family returned to Czechoslovakia in July 1945, they brought with a boy named Tomi from the same town as them, both of whose parents had died in Auschwitz; (Note: Jüdische Allgemeine suggests Tomi was six at the time, whereas NeverAgain and Memory of Nations suggest he was five.) Umlauf's mother was able to relocate the child's parents. Umlauf's father, grandmother, great-grandmother, great-grandfather, and three aunts had all also been killed. Umlauf and her mother were sent to the High Tatras to recover from their tuberculosis, for which there was no medicinal cure at the time. Umlauf has no memories from her time at Auschwitz, but has said that on returning "something is triggered deep inside me"; her first memories are of her recovery in the following years. She was one of the few Slovaks who survived Auschwitz, of the thousands deported there. When asked what Auschwitz is to her, she replied "für mich ist das der größte Friedhof der Welt" – "to me it is the largest cemetery in the world".

== Life after World War II ==
=== Career ===
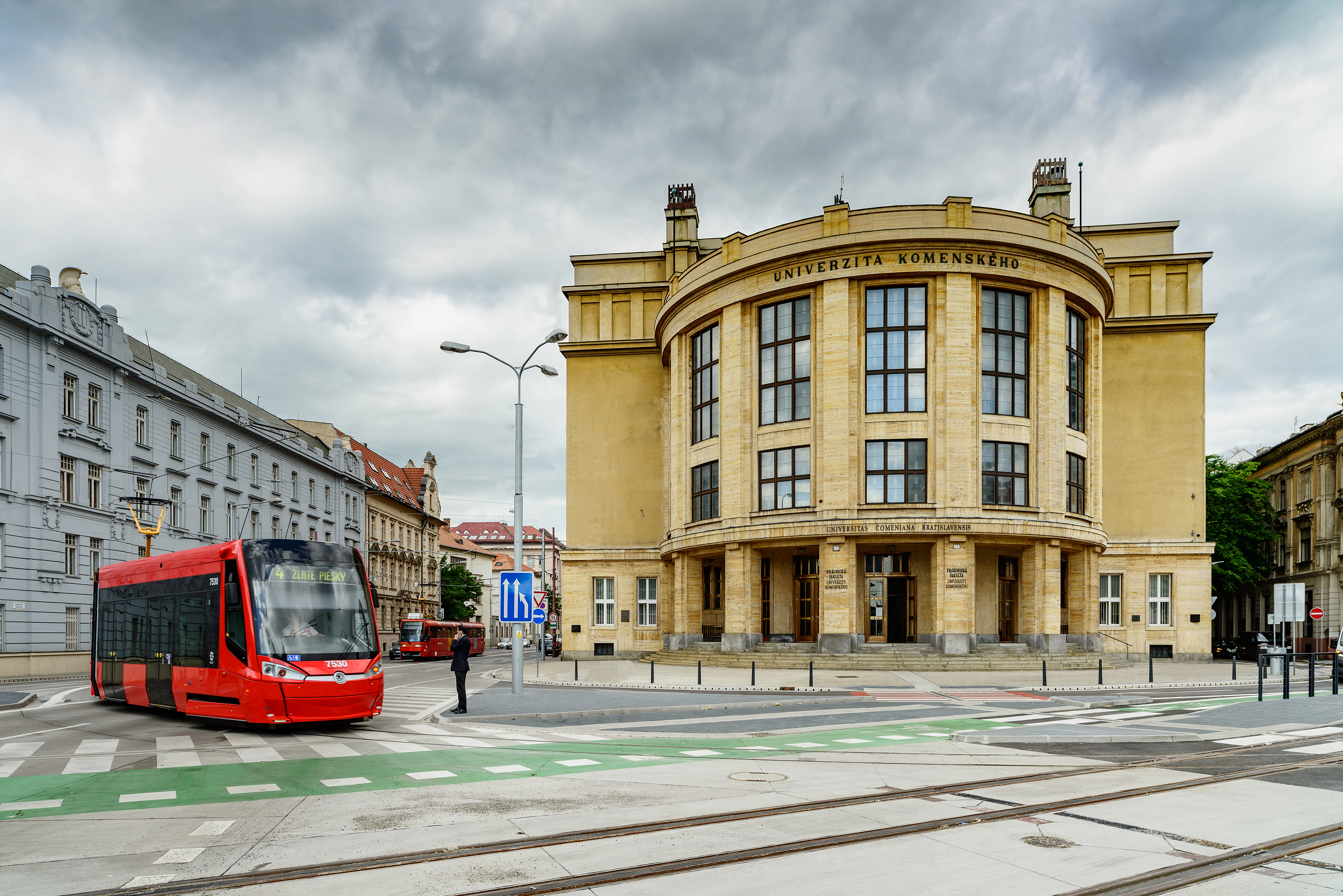
Comenius University, where Umlauf studied medicine

After returning from their recovery in the High Tatras, Umlauf's family lived in Trenčín, Slovakia, where both she and her sister successfully completed their Abitur. Umlauf then studied medicine at Comenius University, Bratislava, before marrying the Polish Holocaust-survivor and building contractor Jakob Sultanik in 1966, with whom she had one son. In 1967, the pair moved to Munich, East Germany. There, they successfully completed training to become paediatricians at the München Klinik Harlaching (English: Harlaching Clinic, Munich). After the Prague Spring her mother fled to Munich alongside her second husband. By this time her sister, who had also become a doctor, was living in Munich too. After the accidental death of her first husband in 1971, Umlauf married again to Dr Bernd Umlauf and had two sons.

Umlauf later stated that "it’s no accident that my sister and I became doctors" due to the "absolute primal need to help people and save lives" as a result of their Holocaust stories. From 1976 she worked for many years as a paediatrician in Munich, before becoming qualified in psychotherapeutic medicine, and she has been active as a psychotherapist since 1996. In this role she has worked with both victims and perpetrators of the Holocaust. One particular interest of hers is the inheritance of trauma between generations, which she encountered through her mother's own refusal to talk about the Holocaust. She is a member of the Ärztlichen Akademie für Psychotherapie von Kindern und Jugendlichen (Medical Academy for Psychotherapy of Children and Young People).

=== Memoir and Holocaust education ===
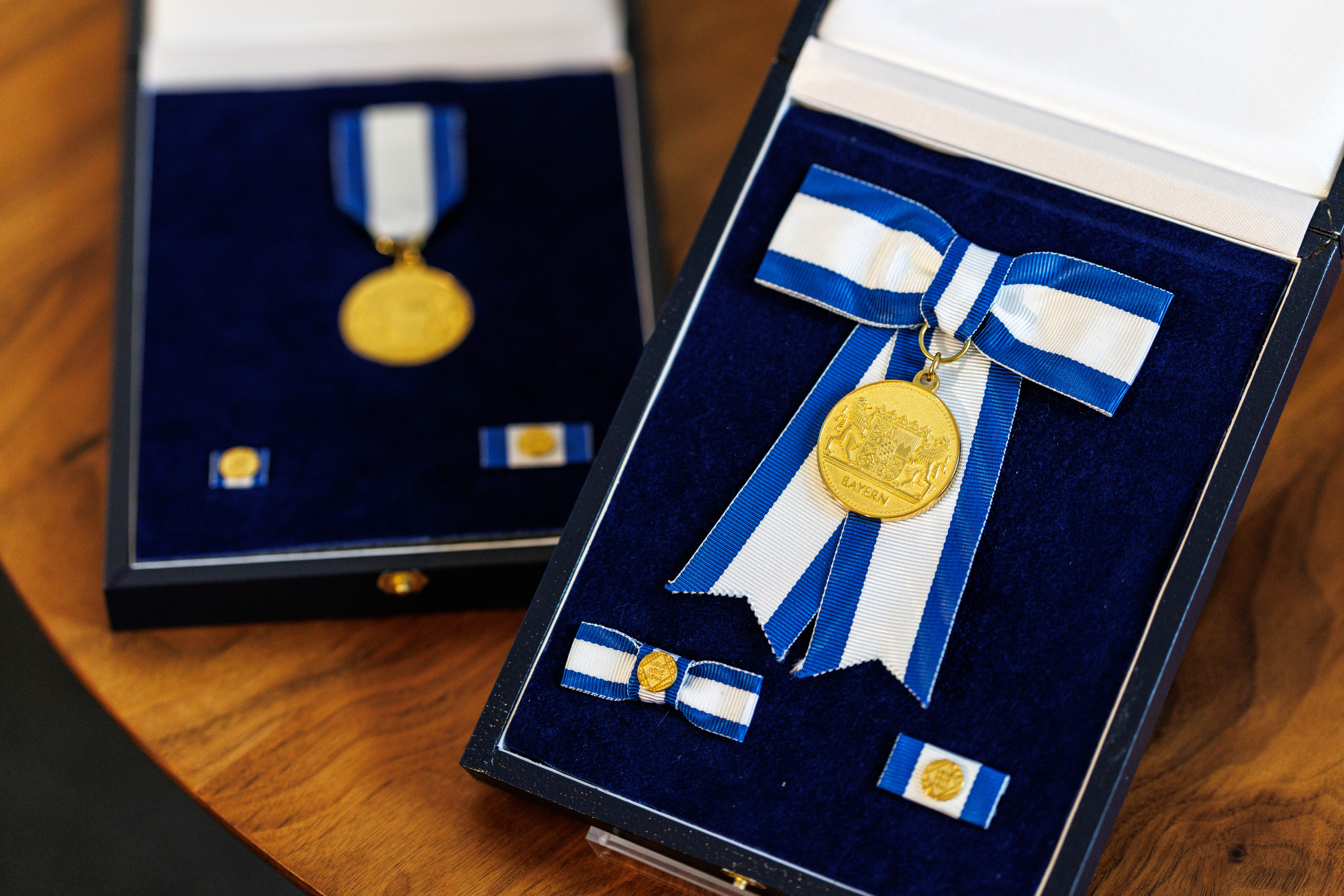
Umlauf was awarded the Bayerischer Verfassungsorden.

On 27 January 2011, Eva Umlauf spoke at an anniversary service commemorating the liberation of Auschwitz. After a heart attack in February 2014, she decided to publicly share her experiences. In March 2016, her memoir, titled Die Nummer auf deinem Unterarm ist blau wie deine Augen (The Number On Your Forearm Is Blue Like Your Eyes), was published by Hoffmann and Campe. The book was released in Slovak in 2018. The title of the book is a line of a poem that a friend of Umlauf's had sent to her. In an interview, she said that she wrote the book so that the fate of her family would not be forgotten, as it was not available in existing records.

In June 2024, an interview with Umlauf by Timofey Neshitov, which was published in Der Spiegel with the title Die Perfekte Zeugin (The Perfect Witness), won the Egon Erwin Kisch Prize. This is a reference to her as a Zeitzeugin ('Contemporary Witness'), a person who is able to testify the events of a particular foregone time period.

On 30 January 2025, Umlauf reached out to Friedrich Merz in an open letter published in Süddeutsche Zeitung; writing to him "as one of the last Holocaust survivors in Germany". She warned him, amongst other things, to protect against right-wing extremism, and advised him to seek compromise with democratic parties, as otherwise enemies of democracy would be normalised. She regularly visits schools, stating her aim is to prevent rising radicalisation and antisemitism, and to encourage discussing the Holocaust even though it is an upsetting topic. On 30 May 2025, she was elected President of the International Auschwitz Committee; she succeeded Marian Turski, who had passed away. In December 2025, Umlauf was awarded the Bayerischer Verfassungsorden (Bavarian Constitution Order). In September 2026, she expressed concern at the result of the Saxony-Anhalt state election, in which the Alternative für Deutschland (AfD) won 44% of the vote, arguing that "we know what happens – what happens to minorities, what happens to foreigners" if the AfD gain power.

== Selected works ==
- Umlauf, Eva; Oswalt, Stefanie (2016). Die Nummer auf deinem Unterarm ist blau wie deine Augen [The Number on Your Forearm Is Blue Like Your Eyes] (in German). Hoffmann und Campe. ISBN 978-3-455-50370-8. – Umlauf's memoir of the Holocaust.
- Föderl-Schmid, Alexandra; Müller, Konrad Rufus (2019). Unfassbare Wunder: Gespräche mit Holocaust-Überlebenden in Deutschland, Österreich und Israel [Incomprehensible Wonders: Conversations with Holocaust Survivors in Germany, Austria, and Israel] (in German). Böhlau Verlag. pp. 170–177. ISBN 978-3205232261. – Umlauf is interviewed in the cited pages.
