= Heinrich Bedford-Strohm =

German theologian and bishop (born 1960)

- Bedford-Strohm in 2017
- Born: Heinrich Strohm; 30 March 1960 (age 66); Memmingen, Germany
- Occupations: Lutheran bishop, moderator of the central committee of the World Council of Churches (WCC)

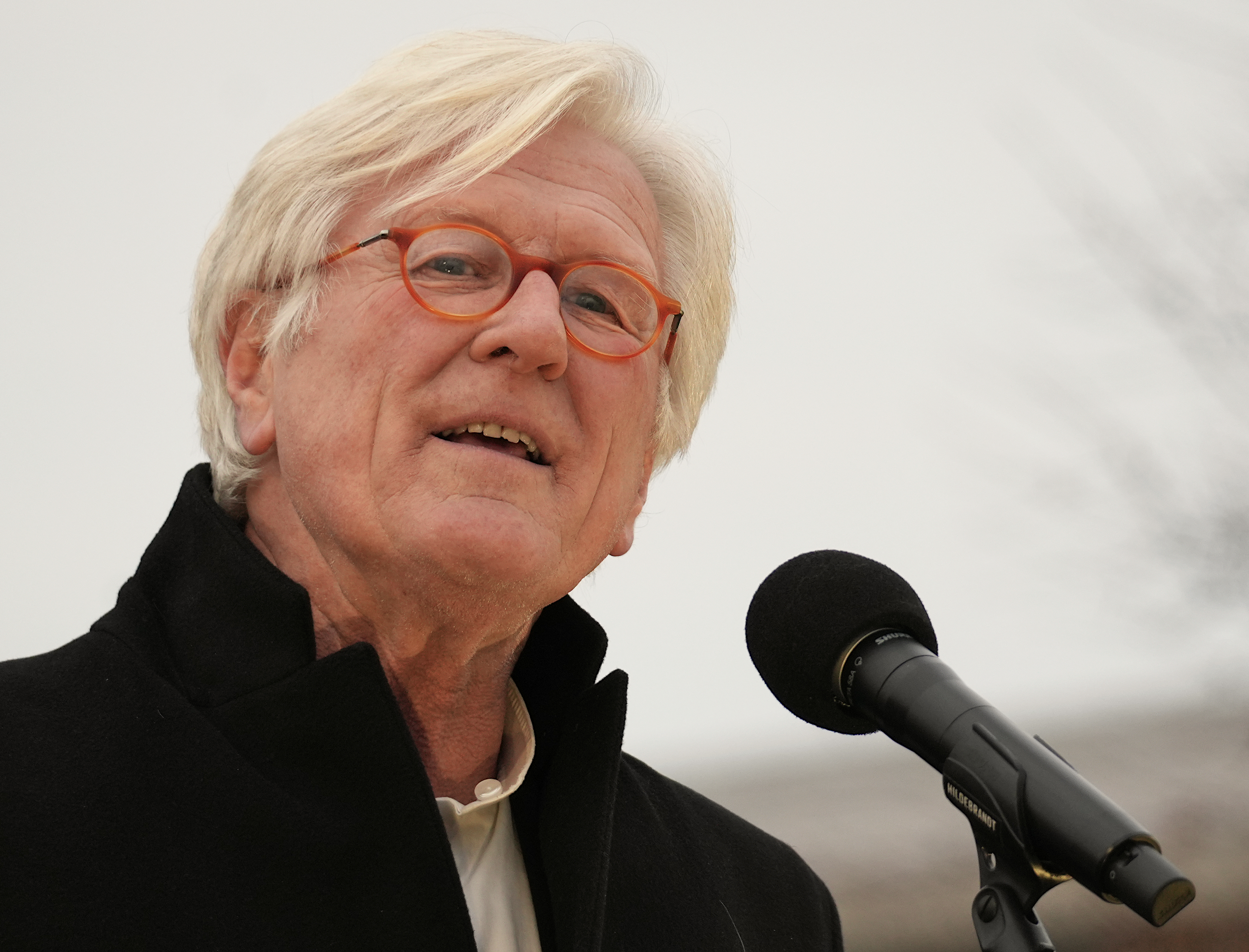
Bedford-Strohm speaks at the Brandmauer (firewall) demonstration in Berlin on 2 February 2025

Heinrich Bedford-Strohm (né Strohm; 30 March 1960) is a German Lutheran bishop. Since September 2022, he is the Moderator of the Central Committee of the World Council of Churches (WCC).

== Life ==
His father was a Lutheran priest in Memmingen. Bedford-Strohm studied Lutheran theology at Erlangen, Heidelberg and Berkeley. In 1997, he became a pastor. From 2004 until 2011, he worked at the University of Bamberg. In 2011, he became bishop of the Evangelical Lutheran Church in Bavaria. From 2014 to 2021 he was the chairman of the council of Evangelical Church in Germany, succeeding Nikolaus Schneider.

After his retirement from the office in the Church in Bavaria, he was elected moderator of the Central Committee of the World Council of Churches at the General Assembly in Karlsruhe in September 2022. He succeeded Agnes Abuom who had held the office since 2013.

In 1985, he married Deborah Bedford and they have three sons.

== Works ==
- Vorrang für die Armen. Auf dem Weg zu einer theologischen Theorie der Gerechtigkeit. Gütersloher Verlags-Haus, Gütersloh 1993, ISBN 3-579-02010-2. (Heidelberg, Universität, Dissertation, 1992).
- Gemeinschaft aus kommunikativer Freiheit. Sozialer Zusammenhalt in der modernen Gesellschaft. Ein theologischer Beitrag. Gütersloher Verlags-Haus, Gütersloh 1999, ISBN 3-579-02626-7. (Heidelberg University, Habilitation thesis, 1998).
- Schöpfung (Ökumenische Studienhefte 12). Göttingen 2001.
- Position beziehen. Perspektiven einer öffentlichen Theologie, Munich 2012, ISBN 978-3-532-62440-1
- Leben dürfen – Leben müssen. Argumente gegen die Sterbehilfe, Munich 2015, ISBN 978-3-466-37114-3.
- Funkenflug. Glaube neu entfacht. adeo, Aßlar 2015, ISBN 978-3-86334-072-8.
- mit-ge-fühl. Ein Plädoyer, Munich 2016
- Alles ändert sich. Die Welt im Licht von Weihnachten. Patmos, Ostfildern, 2016, ISBN 978-3-8436-0852-7.

== Awards ==
- 2015: Hans Ehrenberg Award
- 2016: Herbert Haag Award
- 2017: Bavarian Order of Merit
- 2019: Oswald von Nell-Breuning Award

Titles in Lutheranism
Preceded by Johannes Friedrich	Landesbischof of Bavaria; 2011–2023	Succeeded by Christian Kopp
