= Franz Götz (politician) =

German politician (born 1945)

Franz Götz (born 16 September 1945 in Ingolstadt, Germany) is a German politician. He was a member of the state parliament of Bavaria for the SPD from 1978 to 2003. In 2007, he left the SPD and joined the Free Voters.

== Early life ==
Götz attended the Reuchlin Gymnasium school in Ingolstadt, where he obtained his Abitur. After leaving school, Götz studied Engineering in Saarbrücken, Trier, and Munich. He passed his general civil engineering examination in 1968 and obtained an additional qualification in civil engineering business administration in 1970. He was then employed in industry for two years. He then studied to be a teacher in the subjects Construction and Ergonomics at occupational schools, passing the first and second Staatsexamen in 1973 and 1975, respectively. Until 1978 he taught in Ingolstadt and then became a consultant ergonomist. In 1982, he was awarded a doctorate by the Technical University of Munich.

== Political career ==
Götz joined the SPD in 1970. From 1978 he was a member of the Ingolstadt town council. He was elected (indirectly) to the Bavarian state parliament on the SPD list in 1978, 1982, 1986, 1990, 1994, and 1998. He was a member of the following committees:

- Education and Culture committee: 30 October 1978 to 19 October 1982
- Federal and European Matters committee: 20 October 1982 to 21 October 1986, 6 May 1988 to 23. October 1990, 30 October 1990 to 14 October 1994 and 29 October 1998 to 31 May 2001
- Petitions committee: 15 October 1985 to 1 December 1985
- Civil Service committee: 15 October 1985 to 21 October 1986
- Constitutional, Legal, and Local Government committee: 12 November 1986 to 23 October 1990 and 30. October 1990 to 14 October 1994
- Economics, Transport, and Border Areas committee: 10 November 1994 to 27 September 1998
- Local Government and Security committee: 31 May 2001 to 5 October 2003

In 2007, without laying down his town council mandate, Götz left the SPD and joined the parliamentary party of the Free Voters.

== Commercial and social activities ==
Götz was the sole managing director of GERO Gesellschaft zur Förderung der Beziehungen in Wissenschaft und Wirtschaft zwischen Deutschland und Rumänien mbH, a company he founded in 2001. He liquidated this company 2010. In 2003, he was co-founder of the Hilfswerks des Lions Club Ingolstadt "Auf der Schanz" e.V. and was its president until 2009.

== Honours ==
- Bavarian Order of Merit
- Bavarian Constitutional Medal (Bayerische Verfassungsmedaille) in silver and in gold.
- Honorary doctorate of the University of Oradea

== Personal life ==
Götz is Roman Catholic, unmarried, and has one child.
