= Bayerischer Verfassungsorden =

German award

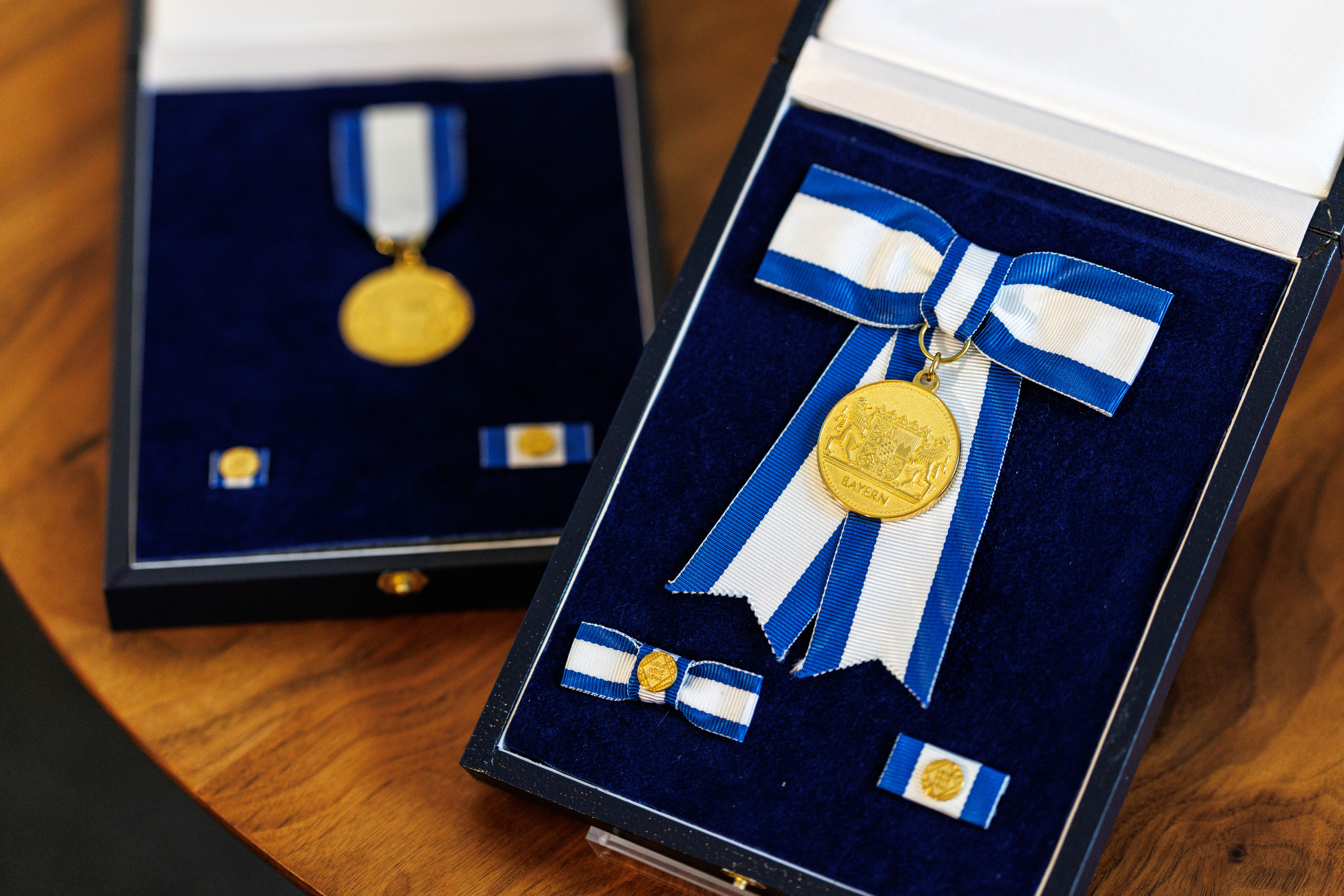
- Current order
- Sponsored by: Bavarian state parliament
- Country: Germany
- First award: 1 December 1961

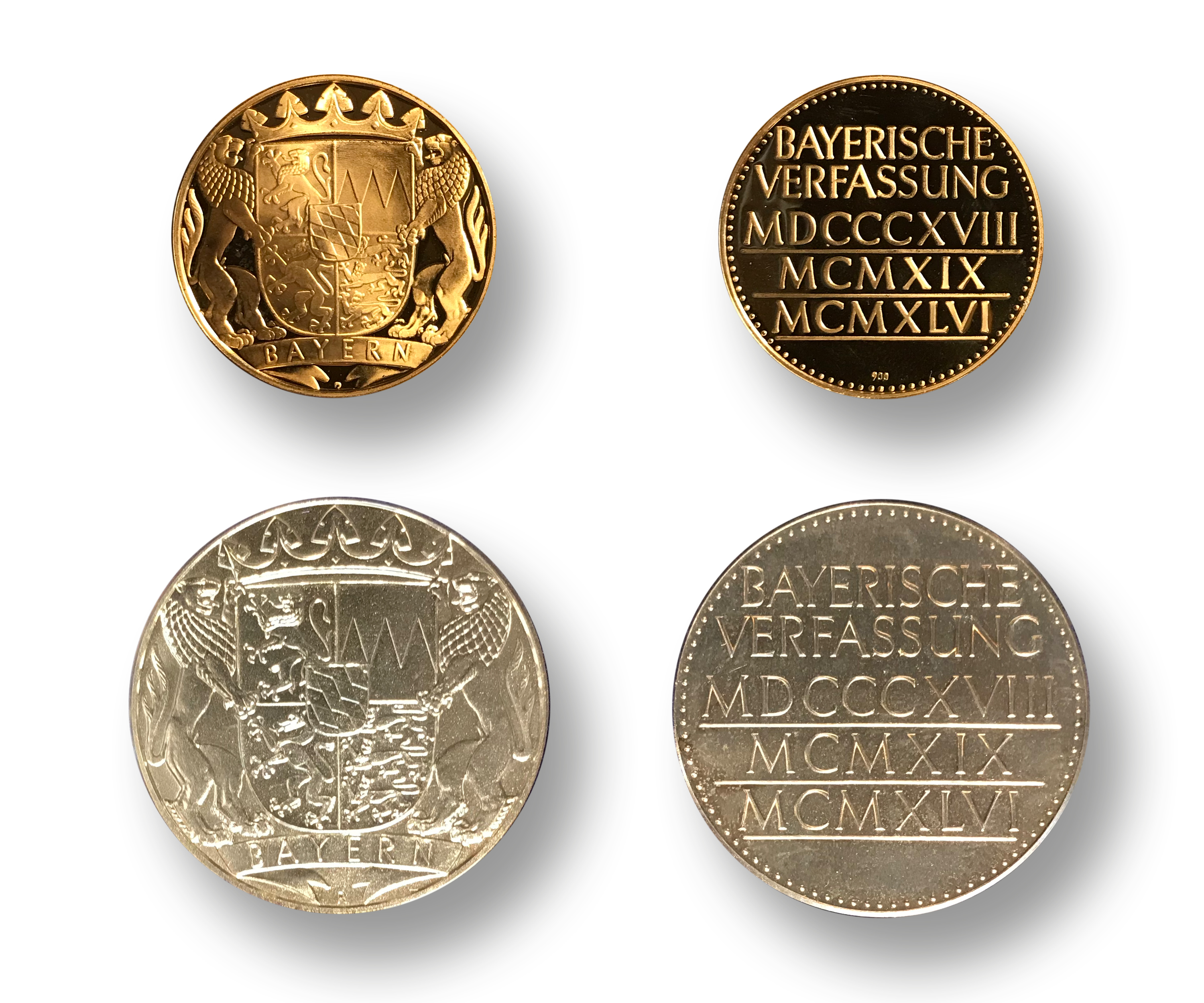
Former medal version

The Bayerischer Verfassungsorden (Bavarian Constitution Order) is an award by the German state Bavaria, which is awarded annually by the Bavarian state parliament to persons who have rendered outstanding services to the Bavarian constitution. It was founded as the Bayerische Verfassungsmedaille, 'Bavarian Constitution Medal' before being upgraded to an order in 2011.

The medal was established on 1 December 1961, donated by the then president of parliament Rudolf Hanauer, as the necessity arose to honour long-serving members of parliament. The inscription on the medal is "Bayerische Verfassung" (Bavarian constitution) with the Roman year figures MDCCCXVIII (1818), MCMXIX (1919) and MCMXLVI (1946), the obverse shows the Coat of arms of Bavaria. The medal was given in Silver and Gold.

On 20 July 2011, the medal was elevated to the rank of an order.

== Recipients ==
Many politicians received the medal, including Franz Götz and Sabine Leutheusser-Schnarrenberger. Members of the Bavarian parliament receive it usually after three legislative periods (formerly 12 years, now 15 years of service), ministers typically after one term (formerly 4 years, now five years). The medal has been awarded also to artists such as ballerina Konstanze Vernon, and clerics such as Joseph Alois Ratzinger, the later pope.

=== 2001 ===
- Kurt Faltlhauser
- Ingo Friedrich
- Erwin Huber

=== 2002 ===
- Reinhold Bocklet
- Josef Deimer
- Franz Götz
- Karl Freller

=== 2004 ===
- Johannes Friedrich
- Christian Ude

=== 2005 ===
- Karl Freller
- Charlotte Knobloch
- Ernst Pöppel

=== 2006 ===
- Manfred Christ
- Heinz Donhauser
- Ernst-Ludwig Winnacker

=== 2007 ===
- Otmar Bernhard
- Ruth Drexel
- Mieczysław Pemper
- Gisela Stein
- Klaus Dieter Breitschwert
- Peter Radtke
- Siegfried Schneider (politician)

=== 2008 ===
- Herbert Ettengruber
- Ingrid Fickler
- Heidi Lück
- Marion Schick
- Jutta Speidel

=== 2009 ===
- Dieter Dorn
- Max Mannheimer
- Horst Seehofer
- Ludwig Stiegler
- Dieter Borchmeyer
- Walter Kolbow
- Bernd Posselt

=== 2010 ===
- Michael Glos
- Theodor W. Hänsch
- Gerda Hasselfeldt
- Ludwig Schick
- Siegfried Schneider
- Senta Berger
- Renate Dodell
- Peter Maffay
- Angelika Niebler

=== 2011 ===
- Reinhard Marx
- Waltraud Meier
- Iris Berben
- Wolfgang Kreissl-Dörfler
- Peter Landau
- Eduard Oswald
- Claudia Roth

=== 2012 ===
- Franz Beckenbauer
- Peter Lerche
- Ilse Aigner
- Verena Bentele
- Max Stadler

=== 2013 ===
- Hans-Jürgen Buchner
- Mahbuba Maqsoodi
- Marcus H. Rosenmüller

=== 2017 ===
- Jacques Chagnon
- Philipp Lahm

=== 2018 ===
- Gerd Müller

=== 2019 ===
- Helmut Brunner

=== 2020 ===
- Markus Söder

=== 2021 ===
- Angela Merkel

=== 2022 ===
- Felix Neureuther

=== 2023 ===
- Eva-Maria Beck-Meuth
- Thomas Müller

=== 2025 ===
- Eva Umlauf
