= Heinz Bosl =

German ballet dancer

Heinz Bosl (21 November 1946 – 12 June 1975) was a German ballet dancer.

== Biography ==
Bosl was born in Baden-Baden. He studied at the Bavarian State Opera's ballet school based in Munich. After graduating in 1962 Bosl became a full-time member of the State opera's ballet company and in 1965 he started as a soloist.
Bosl quickly becoming a rising star of the company, he specialized in the danseur noble roles of traditional ballet. Bosl also created roles in symphonie fantastique, Encounter in Three Colours and Casanova in London. He partnered Margot Fonteyn on numerous occasions, she took him on two foreign tours in 1973 and 1974.

Bosl died aged 28 of leukemia. In Munich he had often been the partner on stage of Konstanze Vernon. In honour of his memory, she founded the Heinz-Bosl-Stiftung (Heinz Bosl Foundation) in 1978 to help young ballet students.
