= Konstanze Vernon =

German ballet dancer

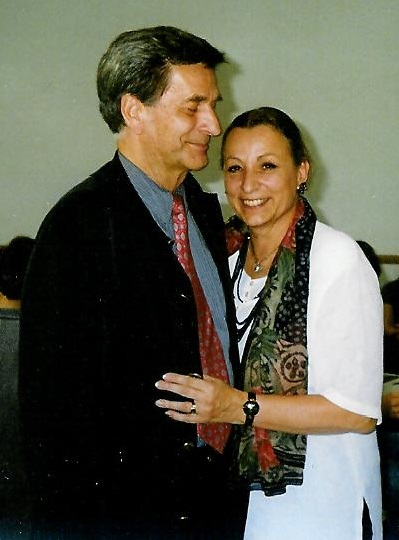
- The ballerina with her husband in 1997
- Born: 1 January 1939; Berlin, Germany
- Died: 21 January 2013 (aged 74); Munich, Germany
- Occupations: Prima ballerina; Academic teacher; Ballet company director
- Years active: 1953–2013
- Organizations: Bayerische Staatsoper; Heinz-Bosl-Stiftung; Hochschule für Musik München; Bayerisches Staatsballett

Konstanze Vernon (2 January 1939 – 21 January 2013) was a German ballet dancer, academic teacher and director of a ballet academy and a ballet company. She was from 1963 to 1981 prima ballerina of the ballet at the Bayerische Staatsoper. She taught at the Hochschule für Musik München and founded the ballet academy Heinz-Bosl-Stiftung in memory of her partner on stage Heinz Bosl. After retiring from the stage, she was founding director of the now independent ballet company Bayerisches Staatsballett.

== Career ==
Vernon was born in Berlin, the daughter of musicologist Friedrich Herzfeld. At age 6 she became a student of Tatjana Gsovsky. She was a member of the Berlin Ballet at the Berlin State Opera at age 14, and at age 17 the company's youngest soloist. Heinz Rosen engaged her at the Bayerische Staatsoper, where she was prima ballerina from 1963 to 1981. Her main partners on stage were Winfried Krisch and Heinz Bosl. Her interpretations of major parts of the classical and contemporary repertory are remembered, including the title part of Giselle, Tatjana in John Cranko's choreography of Onegin, and the heroine in Gerhard Bohner's Die Folterungen der Beatrice Cenci.

She taught at the Hochschule für Musik München, during her career as a lecturer, afterwards as professor and director of the Ballett-Akademie München. In memory of Bosl, who died in 1975, she founded in 1978 the ballet academy Heinz-Bosl-Stiftung (Heinz Bosl Foundation). She succeeded in separating the ballet company of the Staatsoper, forming the independent Bayerisches Staatsballett and serving as its director from 1988 to 1998. In 2010 she retired from the Ballett-Akademie München and founded the Junior Company (Bayerisches Staatsballett II), a bridge between academic ballet training and professional dancers, to serve the needs of young dancers at the beginning of their careers.

Vernon died in Munich.

== Awards ==
- 1962 Serge Lifar Prize of the Academie de Danse, Paris, as the first German to receive the prize
- 1982 Bayerischer Verdienstorden
- 1991 Deutscher Tanzpreis
- 1993 Bavarian Maximilian Order for Science and Art
- 1998 Honorary member of the Bayerische Staatsoper
- 2006 Culture prize of the Bayerische Landesstiftung
- 2007 Bayerische Verfassungsmedaille in Gold
