= Florian Streibl =

German politician (born 1963)

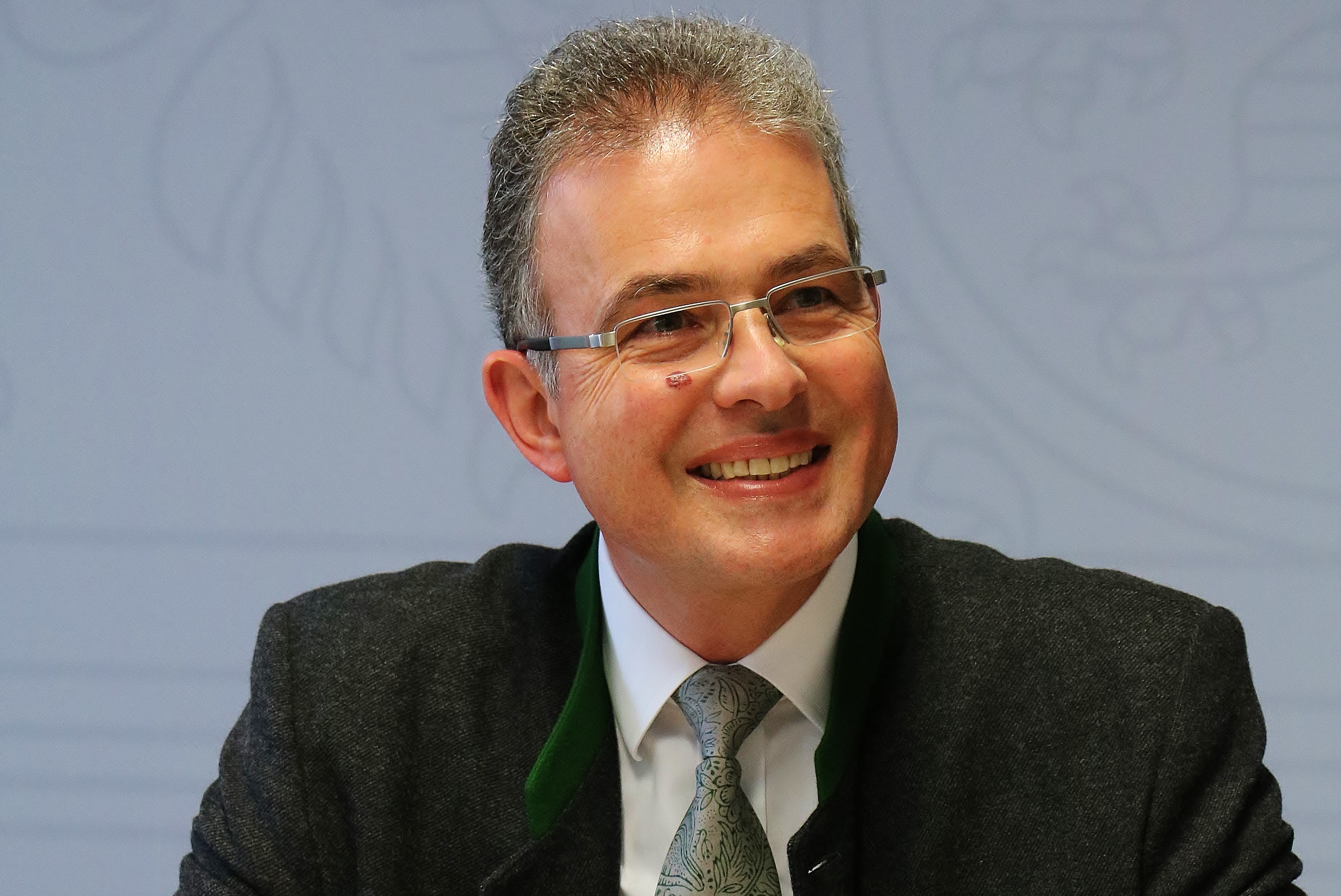
Streibl in 2016

Florian Streibl (born 10 April 1963) is a German community leader and politician of the Free Voters faction (German: Freie Wähler) in the Bavarian Parliament. He has been a member of the Bavarian Parliament since 2008, and as of 2018 is the current faction leader of the Free Voters faction in the Parliament.

== Life and career ==
Streibl was born in Munich. He is the son of the former Minister-President of Bavaria, Max Streibl (CSU). After Streibl’s high school graduation in 1984, he studied Theology until 1989. He went on to study law, becoming a lawyer in 1997.

Streibl belonged to the CSU (Christian Socialist Union) party from 1988 until 1993. In 2001 he joined the Oberammergauer voting group For our Village (German: Für unser Dorf), later on joining the Free Voters in 2008.

In the 2008 Parliamentary Elections he was selected from the party list in the constituency of Upper Bavaria to serve in Parliament. He campaigned in the district of Bad Tölz-Wolfrathausen, Garmisch Partenkirchen, where he achieved 14.3% of the vote, putting him in the lead over the CSU Candidate Martin Bachhuber. He was reelected twice following the parliamentary elections of 15 September 2013 and 14 October 2018. After the 2018 election he received the highest vote among the Free Voters in Upper Bavaria.

He served as the Party Whip of the Free Voters Parliamentary Faction until 2018. He also serves as a member of the Committee on Constitution, Legal, and Parliamentary Affairs and Integration, the Consumer Protection Committee, the Committee on Petitions and Complaints, and the Committee on Data Security within the Bavarian Parliament. Streibl played a key role in the establishment of the inquiry committee in the case of Gustl Mollath in 2013, and was then one of the two other chairmen who worked alongside Florian Herrmann (CSU). He also belonged to the committee which was investigating the Schottdorf affair.

On 5 November 2018 Streibl was confirmed Parliamentary Party Leader of the Free Voters with a 21-27 vote.

Streibl is married and has two children.
