= Hanns Reinartz =

German conductor

Hanns Reinartz (7 June 1911 in Düsseldorf - 1 December 1988) was the first president of the Hochschule für Musik Würzburg, where he was professor of conducting. In the 1930s, he was assistant to Richard Strauss and Hans Pfitzner, in 1940 musical director of the Bonn theatres, in 1946 municipal music director in Solingen, and from 1951 first Kapellmeister in Wuppertal. From 1954 to 1956, he was opera conductor at the National Theatre in Weimar. In 1956, he was appointed to Würzburg, where he was director of the Bavarian State Conservatory of Music. Under his leadership, the former state conservatory was elevated in 1973 to the rank of the second Bavarian College of Music, whose president he remained until his retirement in 1979.

At the same time he was active as a conductor, especially for works of the baroque period, and within the framework of the Mozart Festival Würzburg and the Würzburg Bachtage.

Reinartz died in Würzburg at the age of 77.

== Recordings ==
- Water Music Suite No.1 for orchestra in F major, HWV 348 Minuet, Composed by George Frideric Handel, Performed by Lotte Bamberger, Conducted by Hanns Reinartz, Audio-CD, Original Release Date May 21, 1996, Label: Music All Occasions
- The Magnificent Baroque, Bach: Brandenburg Concertos No. 3 & 4, Classical Compilation, Timeless Media Group 2006
