= Johannes Friedrich (bishop) =

German theologian and bishop (1948–2025)

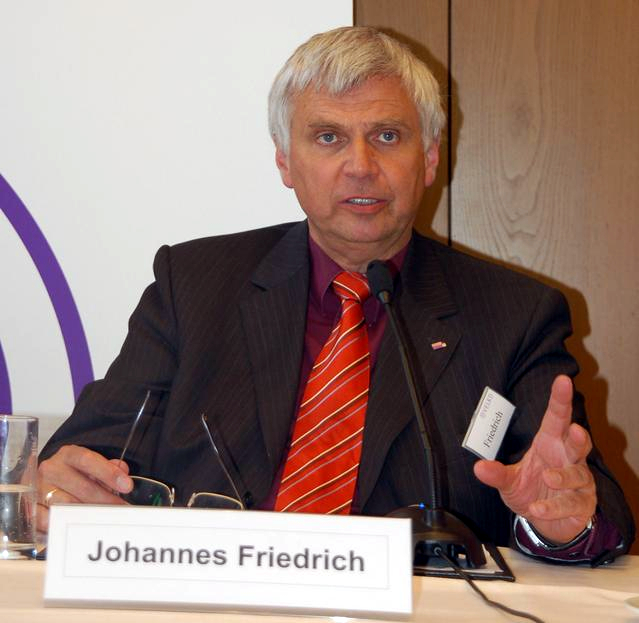
Friedrich in 2009

Johannes Friedrich (20 June 1948 – 3 September 2025) was a German Lutheran theologian and bishop.

== Biography ==
Friedrich studied theology at the University of Erlangen-Nuremberg and the University of Tübingen. He was a reverend in Nuremberg, a campus minister at the University of Erlangen-Nuremberg, and provost at the Lutheran Church of the Redeemer in Jerusalem. In October 2009 he was elected as a member of the EKD Council of the Protestant Church in Germany. Since 1999 he was Landesbischof (bishop) of the Evangelical Lutheran Church in Bavaria, and in November 2005 he became the leading bishop of the United Evangelical Lutheran Church of Germany. In 2000, Friedrich worked on a Lutheran/Catholic joint declaration on the Doctrine of Justification. He supported dialogue in order to foster Christian–Islamic understanding. Friedrich was a member of the Deloitte Germany Advisory Board. Friedrich died on 3 September 2025, at the age of 77.

== Works available in German ==
- Anvertraute Talente, 2008
- Verantwortung gemeindenah und in weltweitem Horizont, 2008
- Das Leitungsamt der Kirche in unserer Zeit, 2008
- Zeugen der Wahrheit Gottes, 2006
- Den einmal begonnenen Weg im festen Blick auf das Ziel fortsetzen, 2005
- Die Confessio Augustana und die Christenheit, 2005
- In ökumenischer Gesinnung handeln, 2004
- Die Zukunft gestalten, 2004
- Zuversicht trotz Zwischentief, 2003
- Vertrauen in die ökumenische Gemeinschaft stiften, 2002
- Ökumene in Deutschland—Blick voraus, 2002
- Zum gemeinsamen Zeugnis berufen, 2001
- Unterwegs zur Gemeinschaft, 2000
- Profil zeigen, 2000
- Gott im Bruder?, 1977
- Gott im Anderen? eine methodenkritische Untersuchung von Redaktion, Überlieferung und Tradition in Matthäus 25,31-46, 1976
- Rechtfertigung, 1976

Titles in Lutheranism
Preceded by Hermann von Loewenich	Landesbischof of Bavaria; 1999–2011	Succeeded by Heinrich Bedford-Strohm
