= Jugend forscht =

German science competition

Jugend forscht (lit. "Youth researches"), commonly abbreviated as Jufo, is a German youth science competition. With more than 10,000 participants annually, it is the biggest youth science and technology competition in Europe. It was initiated in 1965 by Henri Nannen, then editor-in-chief of the Stern magazine.

Participants work on a self-chosen research project, hand in a written report about their work, and then present their results first at regional levels and later at a national contest to an expert jury, usually in the form of a poster session, often including a practical demonstration. Contest juries often invite university or industry experts to referee some of the projects, especially at the national contest, due to a high level of specialization.

Participants can enter in one of seven subject groups:

- Biology
- Chemistry
- Geosciences and Astronomy
- Mathematics and Computer Science
- Physics
- Technology
- Work environment

Participants must not be older than 21 years and can enter the competition either on their own or in teams of up to three. University students are only allowed to participate during their first year of study. Participants younger than 15 years compete in a separate contest called “Schüler experimentieren” (“Pupils experiment”).

Winners receive prizes donated by industrial sponsors. At the national level, one project in each of the subject groups is selected as the national winner each year. In addition, there is a special prize for the best interdisciplinary project by the German Research Foundation, as well as additional special prizes for particularly distinguished projects by the President of Germany and the Chancellor of Germany. Some of the winning projects are nominated for the European Union Contest for Young Scientists, and all winners are nominated for the Studienstiftung des deutschen Volkes.
