= Wolfgang Fikentscher =

German jurist and legal anthropologist

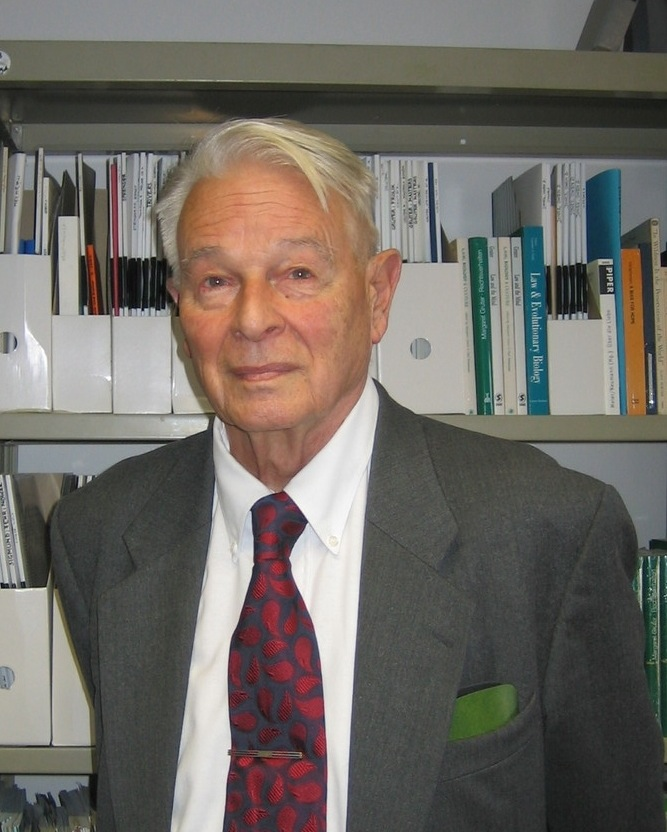
Wolfgang Fikentscher

Wolfgang Fikentscher (17 May 1928 – 12 March 2015) was a German jurist, legal anthropologist, and academic.

== Life ==
Fikentscher was born in Nuremberg, Germany. He earned his Dr. Juris (1952) and S.J.D. (1957) at LMU Munich in Germany. His professional career began as an assistant in the law department of Wackerchemie (Munich), at that time under Allied IG Farben control, and as a teacher of labor law at trade union schools (Kochel and Niederpoecking/Bavaria). In 1952, he received the degree of LL.M at University of Michigan Law School (Ann Arbor, Mich.) In 1957, he was appointed full professor at the University of Münster's School of Law. In 1965, he went to University of Tübingen and in 1971 to LMU Munich, holding a chair for civil and commercial law, intellectual property and copyright law, and comparative law, until being emerited in 1996. Since then, he taught anthropology of law at LMU Munich's Law School as an adjunct, intermittently (1996–2000), and was also a guest professor at University of California at Berkeley School of Law.

Starting in 1972, Fikentscher was an External Scientific Member of the Max Planck-Institute for Intellectual Property and Competition Law, Munich, working on competition law in developing countries and the laws controlling market domination. In 1977, he was elected ordinary member of the Bavarian Academy of Humanities and Sciences, Philosophical-Historical Class, Munich, chairing its Commission on Studies in Cultural Anthropology. In 1994, he was granted, together with Professor Robert D. Cooter, Berkeley, the Max-Planck Research Prize for fieldwork and publications in Native American tribal law. Fikentscher holds the Federal Cross of Merit 1st Class of the Federal Republic of Germany, and the Bavarian Order of Merit. In 1995, he was awarded the degree of Doctor Juris honoris causa of the University of Zurich, Switzerland.

Memberships, fellowships:

- Humanwissenschaftliches Zentrum, LMU Munich
- Parmenides Foundation for the Study of Thinking, Munich
- Netherlands Institute for Advanced Study in the Humanities and Social Sciences, Wassenaar, Netherlands (1971/72)
- Santa Fe Institute, Santa Fe, New Mexico (1992/93, 1995/96, 2002)
- Gruter Institute for Law and Behavioral Research, Portola Valley, California (since 1992).

Guest professorships:

- Georgetown University Law Center, Washington, D.C. (1962 and 1966);
- University of Michigan Law School, Ann Arbor, Michigan (1955 and 1987);
- Yale Law School and Yale's Department of Anthropology, New Haven, Connecticut (1986)
- Nanjing University, Nanjing, Jiangsu, China (1993)
- UC Berkeley School of Law, Berkeley, California (1980/81, 1988, 1992, and 1996–2000).

== Work ==
Fikentscher's scientific work is focused on intellectual property law, competition law, comparative law, and anthropology of law. His publications on antitrust law and international economic law were seminal and influenced German, Greek, European, Japanese, and Taiwanese (RoChina) legislation and theory of competition law (PRChina). Fikentscher consulted German, European, and UN authorities and the U.S. Senate on antitrust and unfair trade practices law. He authored a textbook on obligations (contracts, quasi-contracts, torts). In his later years, Fikentscher contributed to the cultural anthropology of law, or comparative legal cultures, a field less known in Germany. He performed fieldwork, for example in Native American (especially South Western Pueblo) and Taiwanese aboriginal tribal legal cultures, trying to trace basic axioms of human legal and economic thinking.

== Personal life ==
Fikentscher was married to Irmgard, née van den Berge, and has four children and four grandchildren.

== Selected publications ==
- Law and Anthropology. Munich 2009: C. H. Beck & Bavarian Academy of Sciences
- Modes of Thought. 1994, 2nd ed. 2004 Tübingen: Mohr Siebeck
- Culture, Law, and Economics: Three Berkeley Lectures. Berne & Durham, NC, 2004: Staempfli & Carolina Academic Press (CAP)
- Die Freiheit und ihr Paradox. Graefelfing 1997: Dr. Resch
- Demokratie - eine Einführung. Munich 1993: Serie Piper
- Wirtschaftsrecht, vol. 1 Weltwirtschaftsrecht, Europäisches Wirtschaftsrecht, vol. 2 Deutsches Wirtschaftsrecht. Munich 1983: C. H. Beck (translated to Chinese Beijing 2010 by Zhang Shiming)
- Methoden des Rechts in vergleichender Darstellung, vol. 1–5. Tübingen 1975–77: Mohr Siebeck
- Wettbewerb und gewerblicher Rechtsschutz. Munich 1958: C. H. Beck
- "A Theory of Legal Monopolies". LL.M. Paper, University of Michigan, Ann Arbor, Michigan. 1953
- "Schadensersatz aus rechtswidrigem Streik unter besonderer Berücksichtigung des politischen Streiks". Unprint. doctoral thesis, Munich 1952
