= Franz Stadler =

German motoring association official

- Born: October 8, 1913; Gut Untermassing near Regensburg, Germany
- Died: March 2, 2000 (aged 86); Munich, Germany

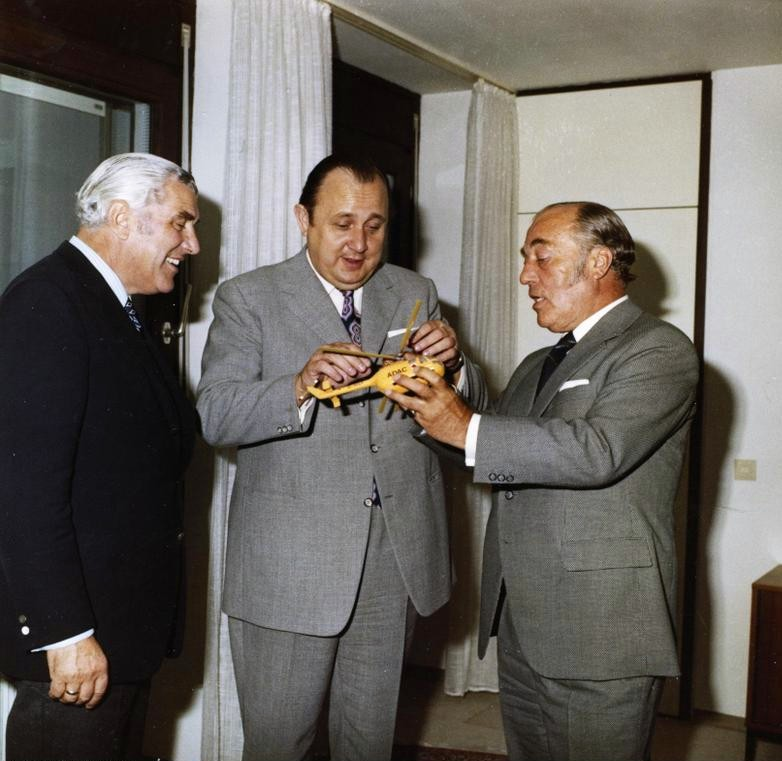
Franz Stadler (left) with Hans-Dietrich Genscher (middle) in 1972.

Franz Stadler (October 8, 1913, at Gut Untermassing near Regensburg – March 2, 2000, in Munich) was a German association official at ADAC.

Stadler, recipient of the Grand Cross of Merit with Star and Shoulder Ribbon of the Federal Republic of Germany and numerous other awards and medals, began his non-remunerated career at ADAC after 1945. In 1949 he was elected vice chairman of ADAC Südbayern in Munich, in 1954 chairman. He became a member of the ADAC Committee in 1953: treasurer from 1957 to 1964 and subsequently vice president. In 1972 he was elected ADAC president and held the office for 17 years until 1989. He was succeeded by Otto Flimm and appointed honorary president.

Stadler is considered the father of civilian rotor-wing air medical services in Germany. On his initiative, the first ambulance helicopter, Christoph 1, was commissioned at ADAC in 1970 (in use since 1968 on a trial basis).

In 1984 he was the honorary starter at the 24 Hours of Le Mans.
