= Ludwig Fellermaier =

German politician

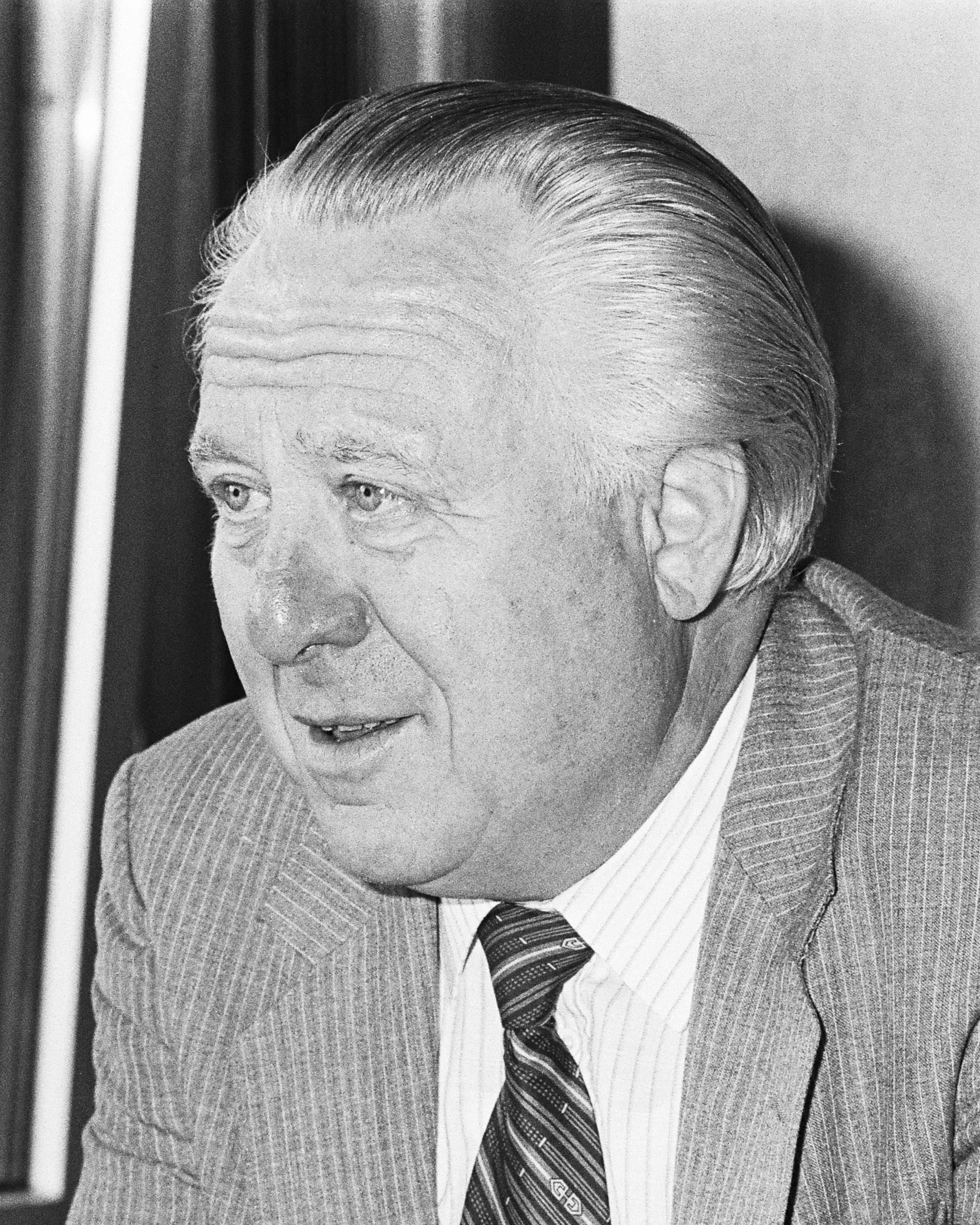
- Fellermaier in 1987

Member of the European Parliament
- In office 19 January 1968 – 24 July 1989
- Constituency: Germany

Personal details
- Born: 2 July 1930 Vienna, Republic of Austria
- Died: 11 March 1996 (aged 65)
- Party: Social Democratic Party of Germany
- Occupation: Politician

Ludwig Fellermaier (2 July 1930 – 11 March 1996) was a German politician. From 1968–1989, he served as a Member of the European Parliament (MEP), representing Germany for the Social Democratic Party. From 1979–1982, he served as Chair of the Delegation to the Joint Parliamentary Committee of the EEC-Turkey Association. From 1987–1989, he served as Vice-Chair of the Delegation for relations with Turkey, and for several months during 1989 served as Vice-Chair of the Delegation to the EEC-Turkey Joint Parliamentary Committee. He also served several periods as Chair of the Socialist Group in the European Parliament.
