= Friedrich Herzfeld =

German musicologist

Friedrich Herzfeld (also Fritz Herzfeld) (17 June 1897 – 19 September 1967) was a German Kapellmeister, musicologist and music critic.

== Life and career ==
Born in Dresden, Herzfeld was Kapellmeister in Aachen, Dresden and Freiburg im Breisgau and was especially known as conductor of works by Wolfgang Amadeus Mozart.

From 1931 he lived in Berlin. From 1939 to 1942 he was editor-in-chief of the Allgemeine deutsche Musikzeitung and from 1940 to 1943 chief press officer of the Berliner Philharmoniker. He wrote books about music and musicians and wrote reviews for music magazines. His most famous work is the "Ullstein-Lexikon der Musik", which first appeared in 1957 as the "Lexikon der Musik" and has since been published under various titles in several new editions and revisions.

The dancer and choreographer Konstanze Vernon was Herzfeld's daughter. The historian Hans Herzfeld was his cousin.

Herzfeld died in Garmisch-Partenkirchen at age 70.

== Publications ==
- Minna Planer und ihre Ehe mit Richard Wagner. Goldmann, Leipzig 1938.
- Königsfreundschaft. Ludwig II. und Richard Wagner. Goldmann, Leipzig [1940]. New edition 1941.
- Wilhelm Furtwängler. Weg und Wesen. Goldmann, Leipzig 1941. 2nd edition 1942. Neuauflage: Goldmann, München 1950.
- Adagio und Scherzo. Kleine Gedichte um große Meister. Frick, Vienna 1941.
- Dreiklang. Haydn – Mozart – Beethoven. Minerva, Berlin 1946.
- Allgemeine Musiklehre. Volk und Wissen, Berlin/Leipzig 1949.
- Du und die Musik. Eine Einführung für alle Musikfreunde. Druckhaus Tempelhof, Berlin 1951. Neuauflage: Ullstein, Berlin 1956. Revised edition 1967.
- Der Meister Tön’ und Weisen. Druckhaus Tempelhof, Berlin 1951. New edition: Ullstein, Berlin 1956.
- Ludwig van Beethoven. Süssenguth, Berlin 1952.
- Magie des Taktstocks. Ullstein, Berlin 1953. New edition 1954. Revised edition 1959.
- Unsere Musikinstrumente. Schneekluth, Darmstadt 1954.
- Musica nova. Die Tonwelt unseres Jahrhunderts. Ullstein, Berlin 1954. New edition 1955. Revised edition 1959.
- Lexikon der Musik. Ullstein, Berlin 1957. Revised edition 1970 (later Ullstein Musiklexikon or Ullstein-Lexikon der Musik).
- Dietrich Fischer-Dieskau. Rembrandt, Berlin [1958].
- Maria Meneghini-Callas oder Die grosse Primadonna. Rembrandt, Berlin 1959. 2nd edition under the title Maria Callas oder Die Primadonna. 1962.
- Kleine Musikgeschichte für die Jugend. Weiss, Berlin-Schöneberg [1959]. New edition [1979], ISBN 3-8036-0138-X. Revised edition: Zimmermann, Frankfurt am Main um 1984, ISBN 3-921729-21-1.
- Herbert von Karajan. Rembrandt, Berlin 1959. 2nd edition 1962.
- Alles über Musik. Schott, Mainz 1959.
- Harfenton und Paukenschlag. Geschichten zur Musikgeschichte. Ullstein, Berlin 1960.
- Du und Musik. Deutscher Bücherbund, Düsseldorf [1960].
- Die Berliner Philharmoniker. Rembrandt, Berlin 1960.
- Das neue Bayreuth. Rembrandt, Berlin 1960.
- Magie der Stimme. Ullstein, Berlin 1961.
- Igor Stravinski. Rembrandt, Berlin-Zehlendorf 1961.
- Schallplattenführer für Opernfreunde. Ullstein, Frankfurt am Main 1962.
- Rudolf Schock. Rembrandt, Berlin-Zehlendorf 1962.
- Elly Ney. Kister, Genova 1962.
- (editor): Ferenc Fricsay. Ein Gedenkbuch. Rembrandt, Berlin 1964.
- Ullstein Musiklexikon. Ullstein, Berlin 1965 (new edition of Lexikon der Musik).
- Magie der Oper. Ullstein, Frankfurt am Main 1970.
- Ullstein-Lexikon der Musik. Ullstein, Frankfurt am Main 1971 (earlier Ullstein Musiklexikon bzw. Lexikon der Musik). New editions 1973, 1974, 1976, ISBN 3-550-06012-2.
- Das Lexikon der Musik. Ullstein, Frankfurt am Main/Berlin/Wien 1979 (earlier Ullstein-Lexikon der Musik).
- Das neue Ullstein-Lexikon der Musik. Ullstein, Frankfurt am Main 1989. Updated edition: 1993, ISBN 3-550-06523-X.
