= Evangelical Lutheran Church in Bavaria =

One of the regional churches of the Protestant Church in Germany

Map of the Evangelical Lutheran Church in Bavaria within Germany

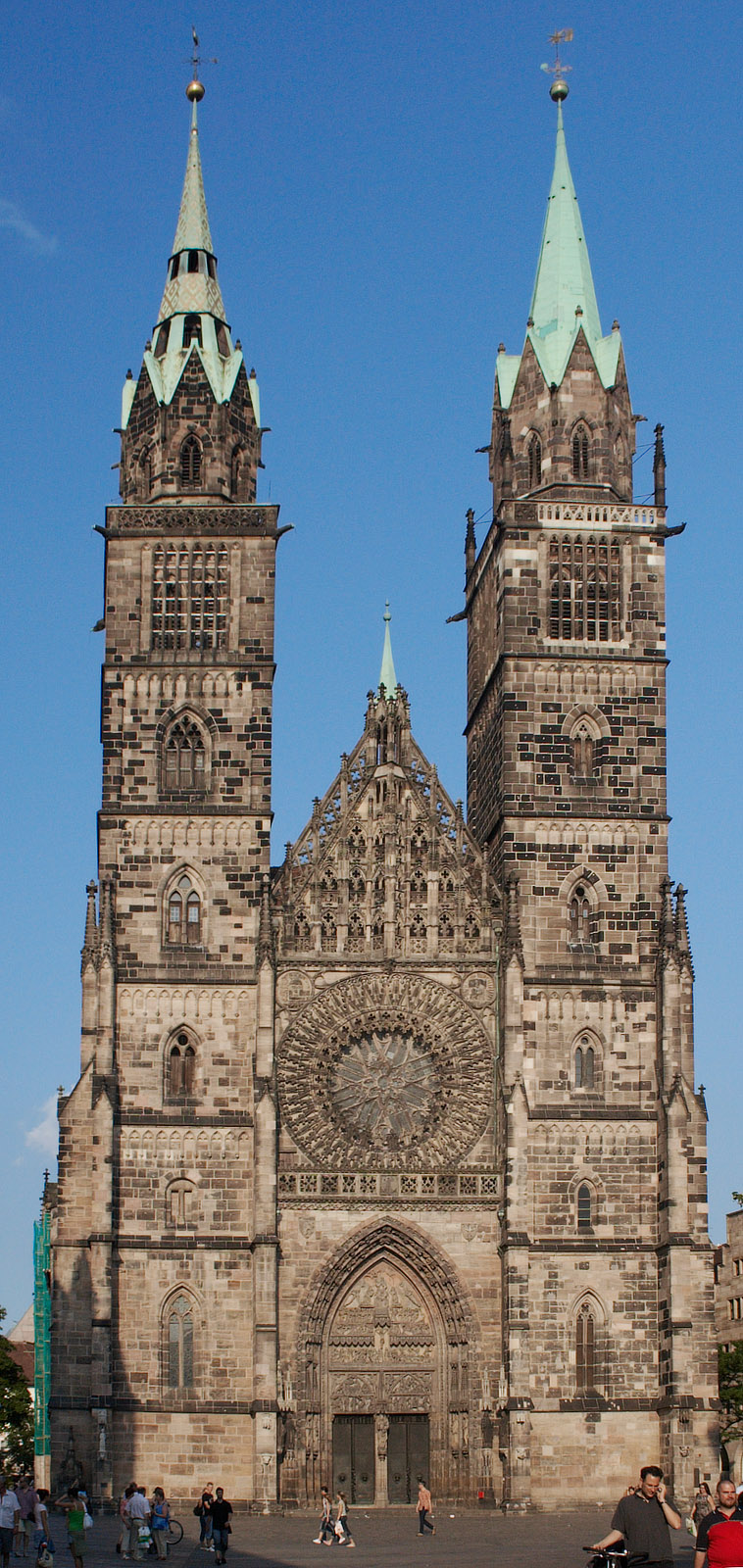
Bishop church St. Lorenz in Nürnberg

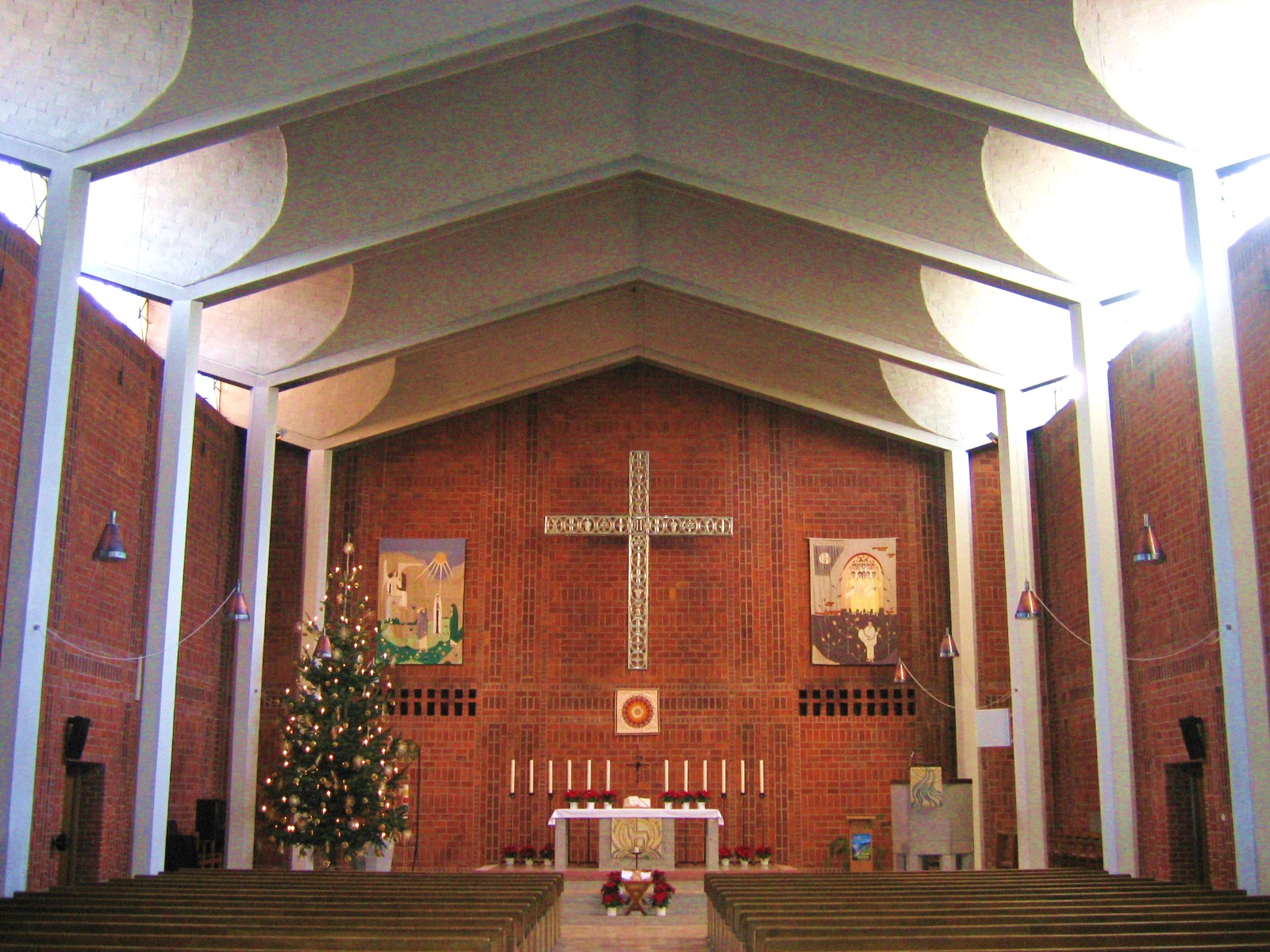
Interior view of the Paul Gerhardt church in Munich

The Evangelical Lutheran Church in Bavaria (German: Evangelisch-Lutherische Kirche in Bayern) is a Lutheran member church of the Protestant Church in Germany (EKD) in the German state of Bavaria. The seat of the church is in Munich. The Landesbischof (bishop) of the church is Christian Kopp. There are six regional bishops (Regionalbischöfe). The Evangelical Lutheran Church in Bavaria is one of 20 Lutheran, United Protestant and Reformed churches of the EKD. The church has 1,968,531 members (2025) in 1,524 parishes. The Evangelical Lutheran Church in Bavaria is a member church of the United Evangelical Lutheran Church of Germany, the Community of Protestant Churches in Europe and of the Lutheran World Federation. The Church runs a conference venue at Tutzing called Evangelische Akademie Tutzing. The most prominent churches of the Evangelical Lutheran Church in Bavaria are St. Matthäus Church in Munich and St. Lorenz Church in Nuremberg where new state bishops get inaugurated. Munich is predominantly Catholic, whereas Nuremberg is a Lutheran stronghold.

== Some theological statements ==
The theological teaching goes back on Martin Luther. The ordination of women is allowed. The blessing of same-sex marriages has been allowed by the synod and depends on the local church administration.

== History ==
During the Protestant Reformation, Bavaria (consisting at that point only of what is today called Altbayern) remained predominantly Catholic. In the early 19th century, the largely Protestant Palatinate and Franconia were annexed to the Kingdom of Bavaria, and all Protestant churches in the kingdom were administratively subordinated in 1817 to an upper consistory in Munich. These congregations consisted of Lutheran and Calvinist congregations in today's Bavaria and congregations of united Protestant confession in the then Bavarian Governorate of the Palatinate on the left bank of the river Rhine.

In 1822, an umbrella organization, the Protestant Church in the Kingdom of Bavaria (German: Protestantische Kirche im Königreiche Bayern), was founded.

Since 1848 the Palatine congregations formed a separate church body (United Protestant Evangelical Christian Church of the Palatinate (Palatine State Church)). Thus the remaining church body was renamed the Protestant State Church in the Kingdom of Bavaria right of the Rhine (German: Protestantische Landeskirche im Königreiche Bayern rechts des Rheins).

In 1918 the Calvinist congregations seceded and formed their own church, the Evangelical Reformed Church in Bavaria (which merged with the Evangelical Reformed Church in Northwest Germany in 1989 to form the Evangelical Reformed Church – Synod of Reformed Churches in Bavaria and Northwestern Germany).

In 1921 the Protestant state church renamed into Evangelical Lutheran Church in Bavaria right of the Rhine when the new church constitution accounted for the Kingdom having become a republic and the Reformed congregations having formed their separate church body. On 1 April 1921 the Evangelical Lutheran State Church of Saxe-Coburg merged into the Bavarian church body, consistent with the Free State of Coburg's referendum on which emerging state to join.

The number of parishioners amounted to 1,575,000 in 1925.

During the struggle of the churches under the Nazi dictatorship the Bavarian Lutheran church body remained an intact church (German: intakte Kirche), since the Nazi-submissive German Christians fraction remained a minority in the synod after the unconstitutional election imposed by Hitler on 23 July 1933. Nazi opponents, forming the Confessing Church, could act within the official bodies of the church. The prior name extension right of the Rhine was removed in 1948, after Bavaria left of the Rhine, i.e. the Palatinate, had been separated from Bavaria by the Allies in 1945.

In 2025, the Evangelical Lutheran Church in Bavaria entered into full communion with the Episcopal Church.

== Presidents and bishops ==
=== Presidents ===
- 1883–1897: Adolf von Stählin
- 1897–1909: Alexander von Schneider
- 1909–1917: Hermann Bezzel
- 1917–1933: Friedrich Veit

=== Landesbischöfe ===
- 1933–1955: Hans Meiser
- 1955–1975: Hermann Dietzfelbinger
- 1975–1994: Johannes Hanselmann
- 1994–1999: Hermann von Loewenich
- 1999–2011: Johannes Friedrich
- 2011–2023: Heinrich Bedford-Strohm
- 2023–present: Christian Kopp

== Synod ==
The election of the synod is for six years.

== Church office ==
The administrative headquarters are called Munich Church Office (Landeskirchenamt) which is based in Munich.
