= Karl Freller =

German politician (born 1956)

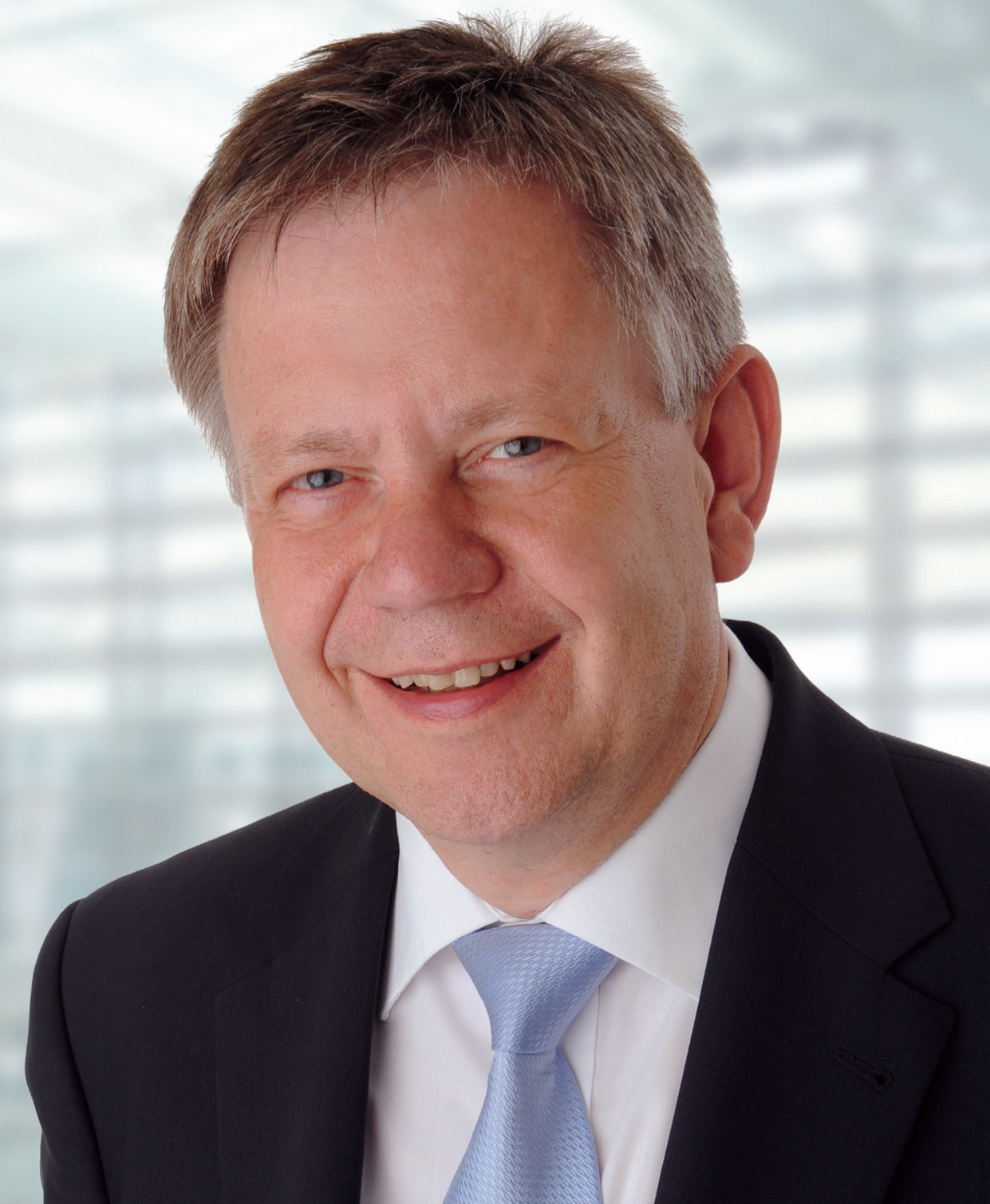
Karl Freller

Karl Freller (born 2 March 1956, in Schwabach) is a German politician, representative of the Christian Social Union of Bavaria. He has been a member of the Landtag of Bavaria.

He is married and has three children.

== See also ==
- List of Bavarian Christian Social Union politicians
