= Annemarie =

- Gender: Female

Origin
- Region of origin: Germany

Other names
- Related names: Anne, Marie

Annemarie (or Annamarie, Annmarie) is a Danish, Dutch and German feminine given name. It is a merging of the names Anne and Marie.

== Notable people named Annemarie ==
- Annemarie Biechl (born 1949), German politician
- Annemarie Bischofberger (born 1960), Swiss alpine skier
- Annemarie Bostroem (1922–2015), German poet, playwright, and lyricist
- Princess Annemarie de Bourbon de Parme (born 1977), Dutch journalist and consultant
- Annemarie Buchmann-Gerber (1947–2015), Canadian textile artist
- Annemarie Buchner (1924–2014), German alpine skier
- Annemarie Cox (born 1966), Dutch-born Australian sprint canoeist
- Annemarie Davidson (1920–2012), American copper enamel artist
- Annemarie Düringer (1925–2014), Swiss actress
- Annemarie Ebner (born 1940s), Austrian luger
- Annemarie Eilfeld (born 1990), German singer and songwriter
- Annemarie Esche (1925–2018), German Burmese scholar
- Annemarie Forder (born 1978), Australian sport shooter
- Annemarie von Gabain (1901–1993), German Turkic scholar
- Annemarie Gerg (born 1975), German alpine skier
- Annemarie Gethmann-Siefert (born 1945), German philosopher
- Annemarie Groen (born 1955), Dutch swimmer
- Annemarie Hase (1900–1971), German actress and cabaret artist
- Annemarie Heinrich (1915–2005), German-born Argentine photographer
- Annemarie Huber-Hotz (1948–2019), Federal Chancellor of Switzerland
- Annemarie Huste (1943–2016), German chef
- Annemarie Jacir (born 1974), Palestinian filmmaker and poet
- Annemarie Jorritsma (born 1951), Dutch Minister of Economics
- Annemarie Kramer (born 1975), Dutch sprinter
- Annemarie Kremer (born 1974), Dutch operatic soprano
- Annemarie Leibbrand-Wettley (1913–1996), German medical historian
- Annemarie Lorentzen (1921–2008), Norwegian government minister
- Annemarie Mol (born 1958), Dutch ethnographer and philosopher
- Annemarie Moser-Pröll (born 1953), Austrian alpine skier
- Annemarie von Nathusius (1874–1926), German novelist
- Annemarie Oestreicher (1875–1945), German politician
- Annemarie Părău (born 1984), Romanian basketball player
- Annemarie Penn-te Strake (born 1953), Dutch lawyer, mayor of Maastricht
- Annemarie Reinhard (1921–1976), German writer
- Annemarie Renger (1919–2008), German SPD politician
- Annemarie Roelofs (born 1955), Dutch trombone player and violinist
- Annemarie Roeper (1918–2012), American pioneer for gifted education
- Annemarie Sanders (born 1958), Dutch equestrian
- Annemarie Schimmel (1922–2003), German Orientalist
- Annemarie Schwarzenbach (1908–1942), Swiss writer, journalist, photographer and traveler
- Annemarie Selinko (1914–1986), Austrian novelist
- Annemarie Sörensen (1913–1993), German singer and film actress
- Annemarie Spilker (born 1980), Dutch photographer
- Annemarie Steinsieck (1889–1977), German actress
- Annemarie Verstappen (born 1965), Dutch swimmer
- Annemarie Weber (1923–2012), German-born American physiologist
- Annemarie Wendl (1914–2006), German actress
- Annemarie Werner-Hansen (1939–1993), Danish sprint canoer
- Annemarie Wright (born 1979), English artist

== Notable people named Annmarie ==
- Annmarie Adams (born 1960), Canadian architectural historian
- Annmarie Morais (born 1973), Jamaican-Canadian screenwriter
- Annmarie O'Riordan (born 1990), Irish singer
- AnnMarie Thomas, American mechanical engineer

== See also ==
- Annemarie and Her Cavalryman
- Annemarie, the Bride of the Company
- Helmuth and Annemarie Sell
