= Sell =

Sell can refer to:

== People ==
- Alexander Sell (born 1980), German politician
- Brenda Sell (born 1955), American martial arts instructor and highest ranking non-Korean female practitioner of taekwondo
- Brian Sell (born 1978), American retired long-distance runner
- Colin Sell (born 1948), English pianist, noted for appearances on radio comedy I'm Sorry I Haven't a Clue
- Edward Sell (priest) (1839–1932), Anglican orientalist, writer and missionary in India
- Edward B. Sell (1942-2014), founder of the United States Chung Do Kwan Association
- Epp Sell (1897–1961), American Major League Baseball pitcher
- Friedrich L. Sell (born 1954), German economist
- Helmuth (1898–1956) and Annemarie (1896–1972) Sell, German couple who saved a Jewish youth from the Holocaust
- John Sell (Democrat) (1816–1883), American Democratic politician
- John M. Sell (1863–1930), American Socialist politician
- Karl Sell (1907–1982), German orthopedic surgeon and founder of the discipline of manual medicine or chirotherapy
- Mary Elizabeth Sell, New York City Ballet dancer
- Michael Sell (born 1972), American tennis coach and former player
- Ronald A. Sell (born 1945), American politician
- William Sell (born 1998), Norwegian footballer
- William Edward Sell (1923–2004), Dean of the University of Pittsburgh School of Law
- Sell Hall (1888–1951), African-American music promoter and Negro league baseball player and executive

== Acronym ==
- Syndicat des éditeurs de logiciels de loisirs (SELL), a French organization that promotes the interests of video game developers
- SELL Student Games, a multi-sport event for university and college students
- Southern Evacuation Lifeline (SELL), a proposed road in Horry County, South Carolina

== Other uses ==
- Sell, West Virginia, United States, an unincorporated community
- Sell (professional wrestling), a wrestling term

== See also ==
- Sell, Sell, Sell, a 1996 album by David Gray
- Sells (disambiguation)
- Selles (disambiguation)
- Selling
