= Markus Disse =

German professor and hydrologist

Markus Disse (born 7 January 1963 in Padernborn) is a german hydrologist and professor of hydrology and river basin management at the Technical University of Munich (TUM). Disse graduated high school in 1982 and began studies in Civil Engineering at the Technical University of Hanover. From 1985, he moved to the University of Karlsruhe (TH) where he specialized in water management and hydraulic engineering graduating in 1990. His dissertation 'Modelling of evaporation and groundwater recharge in flat catchment areas' received summa cum laude in 1995.

After completing his diploma, he worked as a research assistant at the institutes for Hydraulic Engineering and Cultural Technology, and Hydrology and Water Management, at the University of Karlsruhe (TH). From 1996, he was a scientific employee at the German Federal Institute of Hydrology (BfG) in Koblenz, where he led the department of Water Morphology until 1998, specializing in Solids Transport and Solids Balance, and he was subsequently Project Manager in the department for Water Volume, Levels and Discharge Modelling. In 2003, Disse became Professor of Water Management and Resource Conservation at the University of the Bundeswehr Munich, a position held until 2013 when he became head of the Chair of Hydrology and River Basin Management at the Technical University of Munich.

Disse's research includes numerous international publications on topics such as flood risk management, climate impact adaptation, and sustainable water resources management. In recent years, Disse has been working on near-natural adaptation to climatic extremes (droughts and floods) through ecological water retention measures in the catchment areas.
