= List of baseball parks in Pittsburgh =

This is a list of venues used for professional baseball in Pittsburgh, Pennsylvania. The information is a synthesis of the information contained in the references listed.

Note: Allegheny, Pennsylvania, the "North Side", was a separate city until 1908. The ball club changed its formal name from "Allegheny" to "Pittsburg(h)" in 1887, although the team remained physically located in the city of Allegheny.

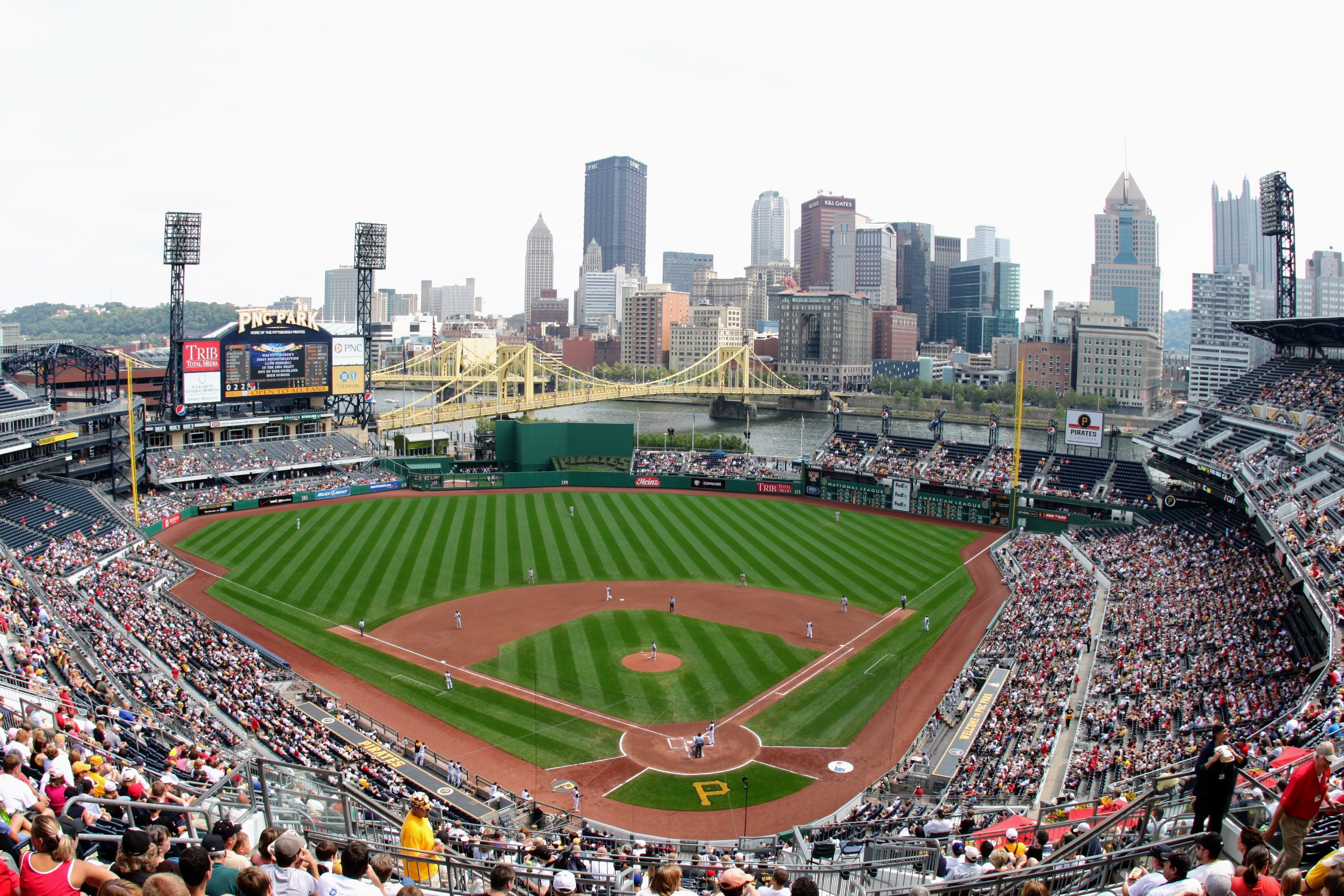
PNC Park

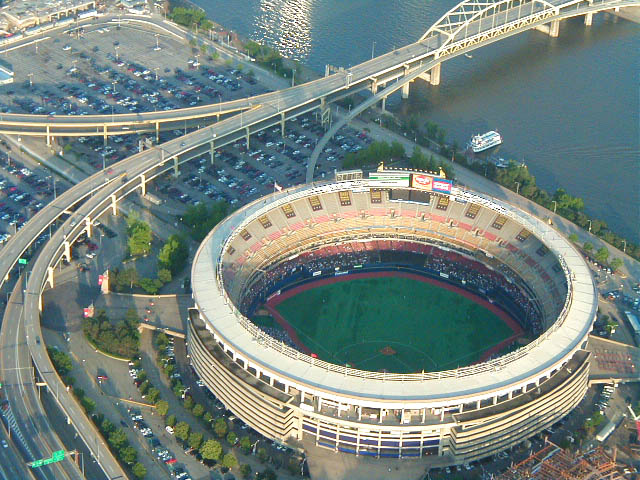
Three Rivers Stadium

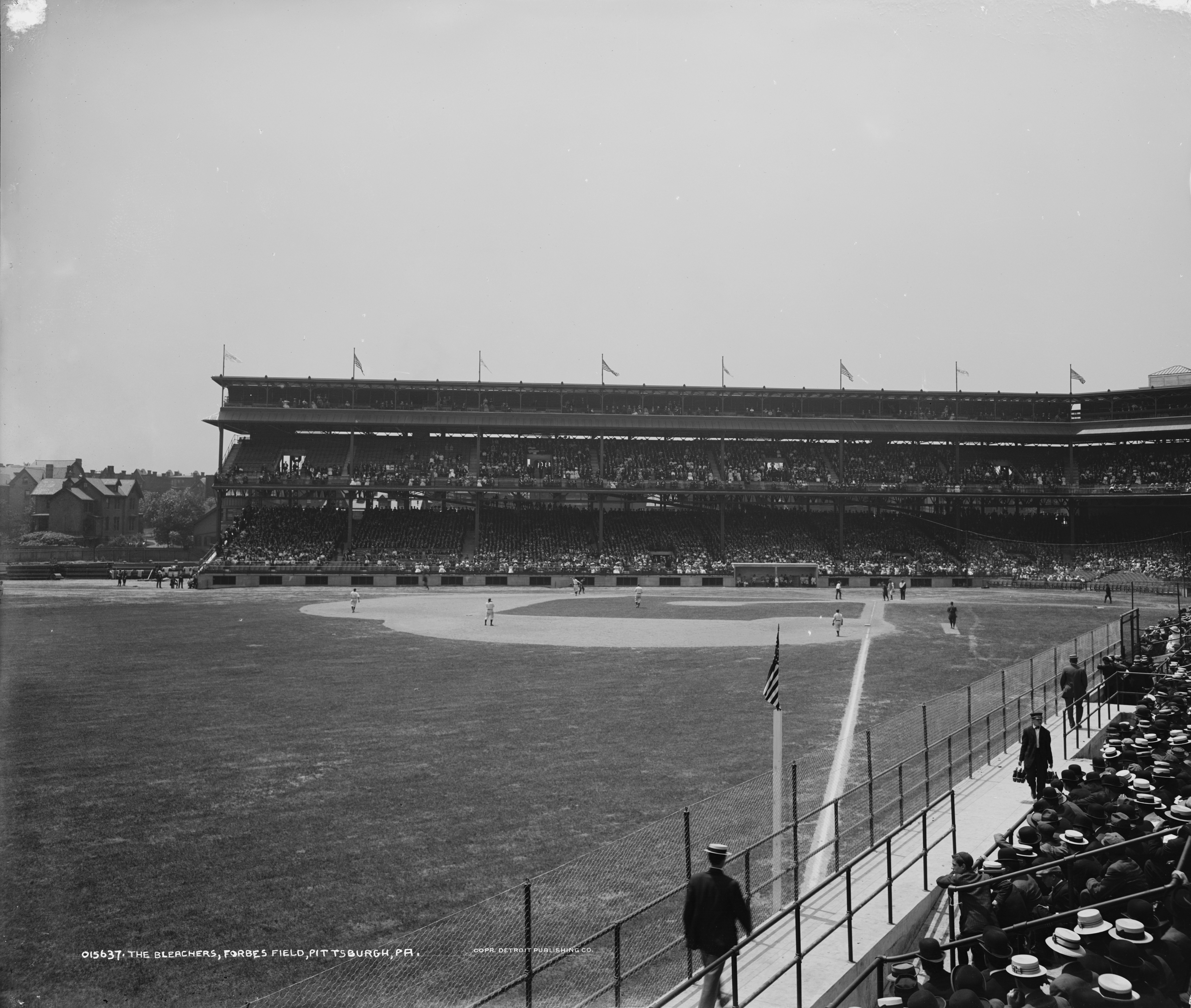
Forbes Field

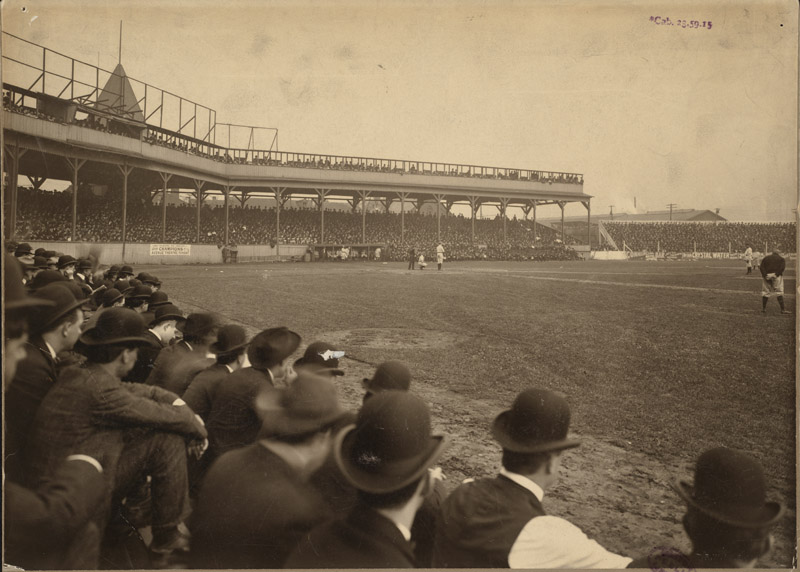
Exposition Park

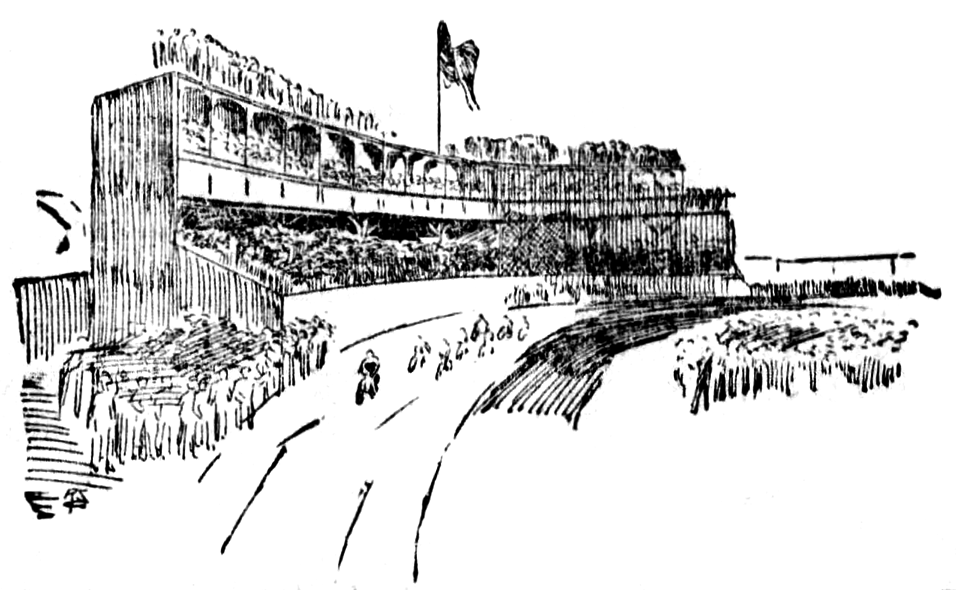
Recreation Park

Recreation Park
Home of:

Allegheny - Independent (1876), joined International Association (1877–1878)
Allegheny/Pittsburgh - American Association (1884–1886), moved to National League (1887–1890)
Also used as a neutral site for one game in the 1885 World Series and one game in the 1887 World Series
Pittsburgh Keystones - National Colored Base Ball League (1887 only)

Location: buildings and Allegheny Avenue (west, third base); Pennsylvania Avenue (north, left field); Pittsburgh, Fort Wayne and Chicago Railway (now Norfolk Southern Fort Wayne Line) (northeast, center field); buildings and Grant (now Galveston) Avenue (east, right field); Boquet (now Behan) Street (south, first base)
Currently: Businesses

Exposition Park
Home of:

Pittsburgh Stogies - Union Association (1884)
Pittsburgh Burghers - Players' League (1890)
Allegheny - American Association (1882–1883)
Pittsburgh Pirates - National League (1891 – mid-1909)
Pittsburgh - Pennsylvania State League (1892)
Pittsburgh Stogies/Rebels - Federal League (1913 as minor league, 1914–1915 as major league)

Location: South Avenue (north, first base) - corresponds to the current General Robinson Street; School Avenue (later Scotland Avenue, now Tony Dorsett Drive) (east, third base); railroad tracks and Allegheny River (south, left field) - just east of the future site of Three Rivers Stadium
Currently: Parking lot for Heinz Field

Forbes Field
Home of:

Pittsburgh Pirates - NL (mid-1909 to mid-1970)
Homestead Grays - Negro leagues (1922–1939)
Pittsburgh Crawfords - Negro leagues (1933–1938)

Location: Oakland district - Boquet (Bouquet) Street (southwest, first base); Sennott Street (northwest, third base), originally labeled Louisa Street; Joncaire Street (south, right field); Schenley Park (northeast, left/center fields)
Currently: Park and buildings for University of Pittsburgh

Ammon Field a.k.a. Ammons Field
Home of:

Pittsburgh Crawfords - Negro leagues (1920s and 1930s)
Homestead Grays - Negro leagues

Location: 2217 Bedford Avenue (south); Somers Drive (east)
Currently: playground and Josh Gibson Field diamonds

Central Park a.k.a. Central Amusement Park
Home of Pittsburgh Keystones - Negro National League (1921-1922)
Location: Humber Way, buildings, Wylie Avenue (north/northwest, third base); buildings and Junilla Street (northeast/east, left field); Hallett Street (southeast/south, right field); Chauncey Street (southwest/west, first base) - location listed in newspapers as Wylie and Chauncey
Currently: public park

Greenlee Field
Home of: Pittsburgh Crawfords - Negro leagues (1932–1938)
Location: 2501 Bedford Avenue (south, first base); Municipal Hospital (now Garden of Hope) (east, right field)
Currently: Bedford Dwellings housing project

Three Rivers Stadium
Home of: Pittsburgh Pirates - NL (mid-1970 – 2000)
Location: 600 Stadium Circle
Currently: Parking lot for Heinz Field

PNC Park
Home of: Pittsburgh Pirates - NL (2001–present)
Location: 115 Federal Street - Federal Street (east, left field); General Robinson Street (north, third base); Mazeroski Way (west, first base); North Shore Trail and Allegheny River (south, right field)

== See also ==
- Lists of baseball parks

== Sources ==
- Peter Filichia, Professional Baseball Franchises, Facts on File, 1993.
- Phil Lowry, Green Cathedrals, several editions.
- Michael Benson, Ballparks of North America, McFarland, 1989.
- Baseball Memories, by Marc Okkonen, Sterling Publishing, 1992.
