= Christian Mölling =

German political scientist

Christian Molling
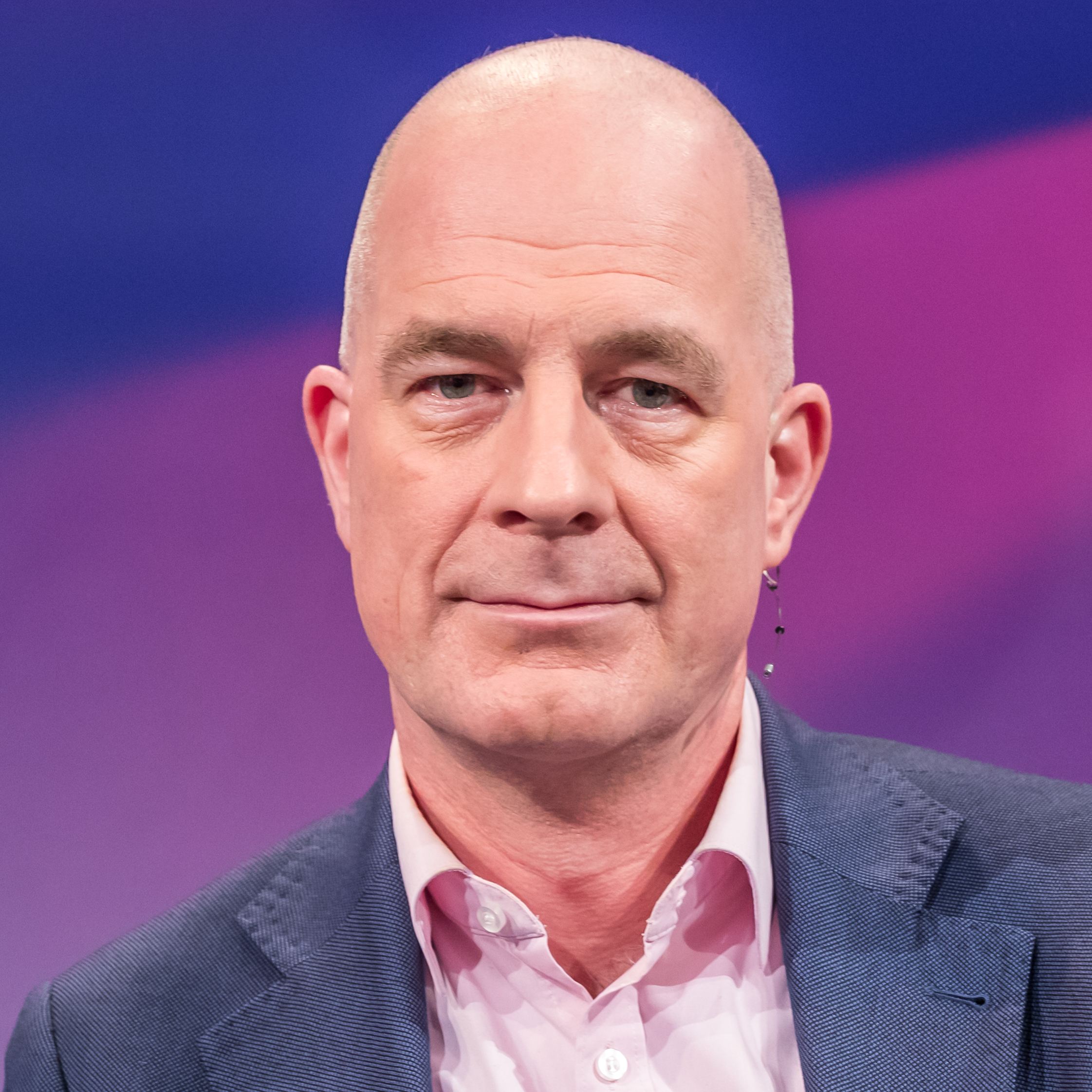
- Molling at Maischberger in 2025
- Born: 1973 (age 52–53); Bad Oeynhausen, North Rhine-Westphalia, West Germany

Christian Mölling (born 1973) is a German political scientist, currently deputy director of the German Council on Foreign Relations, and lead of its Centre for Security and Defence in Berlin.

== Career ==
Mölling started his career as a communication electronics technician, undergoing vocational training of the Deutsche Bundespost from 1990 to 1993. He then served an Alternative civilian service as a paramedic with the Johanniter-Unfall-Hilfe organisation. Then, in 1994, he started studying Social Science at the University of Duisburg-Essen, earning his diploma in 2000. During his studies, he spent a semester as an exchange student at the University of Warwick, studying International Relations from 1996 to 1997.

Mölling then joined the Institute for Defence and Security at the University of Hamburg as a Research fellow, and from 2004 consulted for the German Institute for Human Rights (Deutsches Institut für Menschenrechte) in Berlin. In 2005, he started his PhD thesis at LMU Munich, which he defended in 2009. He was also a research fellow at the Centre for Security Studies of ETH Zurich from November 2007 to October 2009.

In November 2009, Mölling joined the Defence Cluster of the International Security Section of the German Institute for International and Security Affairs in Berlin, rising to Project Leader for North-European Defence and Security Monitoring. In October 2015, Mölling joined the Security Policy Section of the German Marshall Fund as a Senior Research Fellow.

Since February 2017, Mölling has served as deputy director of the German Council on Foreign Relations in Berlin, as well as lead of its Security, Defence and Armament programme.

Since the start of the full-scale Russian invasion of Ukraine, Mölling has made a number of public statements as an expert on defence and security policy. He has been making bi-weekly appearances in the Ukraine – Die Lage ("Ukraine: the situation") podcast of the magazine Stern, taking over from Carlo Masala. Since 2014, along with Claudia Major, he has published several articles in the newspaper of the record Die Zeit.
