= Military aid to Ukraine during the Russo-Ukrainian war =

The Russian government threatened retaliation against countries supplying military aid to Ukraine, and said it meant NATO was waging a "proxy war" against Russia. However, Russia's government has not followed through on its threats, despite most of its "red lines" being crossed. Russia's president Vladimir Putin said that if military aid stopped, Ukraine would not survive for long. In December 2023, the Center for Strategic and International Studies wrote that if the United States stopped sending military aid, European countries would be unable to provide enough to prevent Ukraine's frontline from collapsing. According to the Ukraine Support Tracker, Europe surpassed the United States in total military aid to Ukraine by April 2025, allocating €72 billion in military assistance compared with €65 billion from the United States.

== Russian response ==
Russia has sent a diplomatic letter to the United States warning it not to supply Ukraine with any more weapons and that the United States and NATO's aid of the "most sensitive" weapons to Ukraine were "adding fuel" and could bring "unpredictable consequences." Anti-ballistic systems such as THAAD and sea-based Aegis defenses have been withheld by the United States.

Olga Skabeyeva said on state-owned Rossiya 1 TV: "It can safely be called World War Three. That's entirely for sure. [...] We're definitely fighting against NATO infrastructure, if not NATO itself. We need to recognise that." She has further claimed that NATO is supplying Ukraine with "zillions of weapons".

Russia banned members of the UK cabinet, including then prime minister Boris Johnson and former PM Theresa May from visiting the country: "In essence, the British leadership is deliberately aggravating the situation around Ukraine, pumping the Kyiv regime with lethal weapons and coordinating similar efforts on the part of NATO".

In June 2022, Russian President Vladimir Putin threatened to "strike at those targets that we have not yet been hitting" in Ukraine if the West provides Ukraine with advanced multiple-rocket launch systems such as the M270 and the M142 HIMARS.

Russian aircraft have flown over the Baltic and Black Seas without flight plans, transponders, or communication with civilians or military air traffic controllers. In some cases, they have come close to or slightly violated the airspace of other nations. NATO aircraft from Poland, Denmark, France, Italy, Spain, Romania, Finland, the United Kingdom and Sweden, have intercepted these Russian planes.

In December 2022, Putin's spokesman Dmitry Peskov claimed that due to Western military support to Ukraine, "the suffering of the Ukrainian people will continue longer than it could have".

During a meeting of the UN Security Council on 24 November 2022, Russia's Permanent Representative to the UN Vasily Nebenzya explained the purpose of Russian strikes against Ukrainian infrastructure, saying: "We're carrying out attacks on infrastructure facilities in Ukraine in response to the country being loaded with Western weapons and unwise calls for Kyiv to wield a military victory over Russia". On 1 December 2022, Russian Foreign Minister Sergey Lavrov defended Russian strikes against Ukrainian infrastructure, stating as one of the reasons that the Russian missile strikes were intended to "knock out energy facilities that allow you to keep pumping deadly weapons into Ukraine in order to kill the Russians".

In March 2023, in a televised address, Russian President Putin accused Western countries of trying to prolong the war by supplying Ukraine with weapons. On 20 June 2023, Russian Defense Minister Sergei Shoigu warned Ukraine of "immediate strikes on decision-making centers in Ukraine" if Ukraine attacks Crimea with HIMARS and Storm Shadow missiles. In July 2023, Russian Foreign Ministry spokeswoman Maria Zakharova claimed that Joe Biden's decision to supply Ukraine with cluster munitions "is aimed at prolonging the conflict in Ukraine as much as possible."

== Other responses ==
South Korea has initially declined to send any lethal aid such as the KM-SAM missile system citing its security situation. In April 2023, a spokesman for South Korea's Ministry of Defense stated that "the government's policy of not providing lethal weapons to Ukraine remains unchanged." On 7 November 2024, South Korean President Yoon Suk Yeol suggested that South Korea could provide weapons to Ukraine. However, the South Korean public was widely opposed to direct arms supplies to Ukraine.

Taiwan has kept mainly to humanitarian and financial aid.

Israel refused to send lethal weapons to Ukraine. In June 2023, Israeli Prime Minister Benjamin Netanyahu said that "We're concerned also with the possibility that systems that we would give to Ukraine would fall into Iranian hands and could be reverse engineered, and we would find ourselves facing Israeli systems used against Israel." In January 2025, 90 Patriot air defense interceptors were transferred from Israel to Ukraine by the United States. In September 2025, Ukrainian President Zelenskyy confirmed that Israel had supplied Ukraine with a Patriot air defense battery, stating that the system was already installed and operational.

South Africa has maintained a neutral stance.

Brazil refused the request by the German Chancellor Olaf Scholz to send Brazilian weapons to Ukraine.

Germany opposed the Biden administration's decision to supply cluster munitions to Ukraine.

China's foreign minister Qin Gang claimed that China is not selling weapons to either side in the war in Ukraine. China accused Western countries of prolonging the war by supplying arms to Ukraine to boost the profits of its arms industry. Western politicians, on the contrary, consider the supply of weapons to Ukraine as help in the defense of the attacked country.

Pakistan denied reports that the country supplies weapons to Ukraine. In April 2023, Foreign Office spokesperson Mumtaz Zahra Baloch stated that "Pakistan maintains a policy of strict neutrality in the dispute between Ukraine and Russia and in that context, do not provide any ammunition to them."

Turkey refused the U.S.'s suggestion to give Ukraine its advanced S-400 air defense system. Turkey has denied reports that it delivered cluster munitions to Ukraine in 2022.

== Military aid planning ==
In late March 2022, Ukrainian President Volodymyr Zelenskyy requested "1 percent" of NATO's planes and tanks. Ukraine's requirements moved from defensive weapons, which are hand-held, such as NLAW, Stinger, Starstreak, Javelin and drones to heavier weapons such as artillery, tanks, and aircraft. Ukraine had been relying on Eastern European NATO members' old stockpiles of Soviet equipment, but the number of Soviet-equipment manufacturers in Eastern Europe is limited.

Following pleas from Zelenskyy for countries to send heavier weapons and air defenses to aid in battling Russia, a first meeting was held by the Ukraine Defense Contact Group (also known as "Ukraine Defense Consultative Group") on 26 April 2022 at Ramstein Air Base in Germany. Participants at the meeting were defense ministers and chiefs of staff from 41 countries willing to provide military aid to Ukraine. The meeting was led by United States Secretary of Defense Lloyd J. Austin III. They were joined by Ukrainian Minister of Defense Oleksii Reznikov. The meeting discussed "a steady flow of weapons and other military aid" to Ukraine.

The coalition planned to continue meeting as a monthly "contact group" to address long-term support for Ukraine. In addition to European Union NATO countries, Ukraine, and the U.S., the coalition includes: Sweden, Finland, United Kingdom, Canada, Australia, New Zealand, South Korea, Japan, Morocco, Kenya, Liberia, Tunisia, Jordan, and Israel. Their purpose is to work out ongoing aid to Ukraine, with an emphasis on providing "lethal aid" to help with the ongoing war. Austin said, "I'd like this whole group to leave today with a common, transparent understanding of Ukraine's near-term security requirements—because we're going to keep on moving heaven and earth to meet them." According to Pentagon Press Secretary John F. Kirby: "A new phase, …I think [Austin] also wants to take a longer, larger view of the defense relationships that Ukraine will need to have going forward, when the war is over." Kirby also said, "I don't think anybody can predict how long this is going to go on… The truth is… if Mr. Putin pulled his forces out and stopped this illegal invasion, and sat down in good faith with Mr. Zelensky, [the conflict] could be over now."

Russian comments about a desire to move onto Moldova, after occupying the Southern Ukraine coast and the Donbas, also threaten to expand the scope of the conflict. Although Putin and Russian Foreign Minister Sergey Lavrov have characterized the conflict as a proxy war instigated by NATO, the U.S.-led Ukraine Defense Consultative Group reflects a broader coalition of countries.

On 28 April 2022, US President Joe Biden asked Congress for an additional $33 billion to assist Ukraine, including $20 billion to provide weapons. On 21 May 2022, the United States passed legislation providing $40 billion in new military and humanitarian foreign aid to Ukraine, marking a historically large commitment of funds.

When the Ukraine Defense Contact Group held its latest ninth meeting on 14 February 2023, its list of members had grown from the initial 41 countries to a new total of 54 countries.

In 2022, Congress approved more than $112 billion in aid to Ukraine. In October 2023, the Biden administration requested an additional $61.4 billion for Ukraine for the year ahead. On 20 April 2024, the U.S. House of Representatives approved a $95 billion aid package to Ukraine, Israel and Taiwan.

On 30 May 2024, US President Joe Biden gave Ukraine permission to strike targets inside Russia using American-supplied weapons. The same permission was given to Ukraine by Germany, France and the United Kingdom. Dutch Foreign Minister Hanke Bruins Slot said that the Netherlands would not object if Ukraine used Dutch-supplied F-16 fighters to strike targets inside Russia.

In September 2025, the Trump administration approved the delivery of up to $10 billion worth of weapons to Ukraine from US stockpiles, which would be paid for by NATO allies. On 27 September 2025, President Zelenskyy announced a $90 billion arms agreement with the United States.

In February 2026, the United States approved an arms sale to Ukraine valued at $185 million, continuing its ongoing military support amid the conflict. The package includes various defensive and strategic weapons to enhance Ukraine's defense capabilities . Reuters reported that the U.S. is also seeking a peace agreement by March 2026, followed by nationwide elections, as part of broader diplomatic efforts to stabilize the country and support democratic institutions.

== See also ==
- List of military aid to Ukraine during the Russo-Ukrainian war
- List of humanitarian aid to Ukraine during the Russo-Ukrainian War
- Ukraine Democracy Defense Lend-Lease Act of 2022

Reactions

- German Taurus controversy
- Reactions to the 2021–2022 Russo-Ukrainian crisis
- Reactions to the Russian invasion of Ukraine
- Government and intergovernmental reactions to the Russian invasion of Ukraine
- Protests against the Russian invasion of Ukraine
- Diplomatic expulsions during the Russo-Ukrainian War

Sanctions, boycotts, censorship and cyberwarfare

- 2022 boycott of Russia and Belarus
- International sanctions during the Russo-Ukrainian War
- International sporting sanctions during the Russian invasion of Ukraine
- List of companies that applied sanctions during the Russo-Ukrainian War

Equipment

- List of equipment of the Armed Forces of Ukraine
- List of Russo-Ukrainian War military equipment
- Brave1 development platform
