= German Taurus controversy =

German debate on delivering cruise missiles to Ukraine

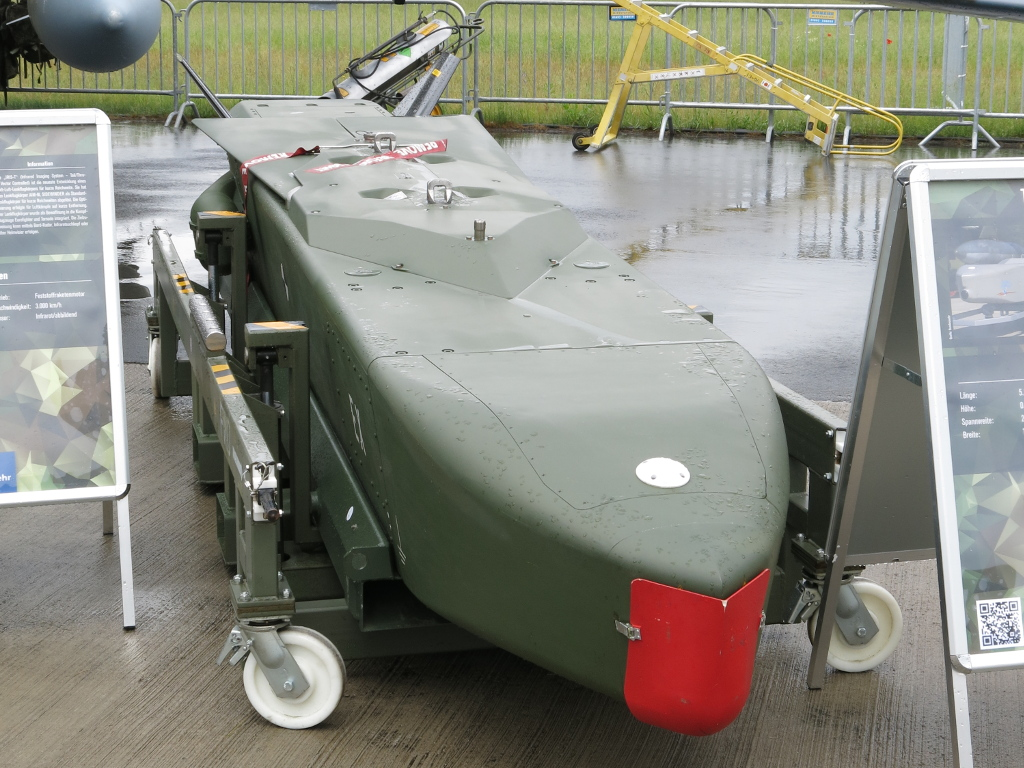
Taurus KEPD 350 cruise missile

The German Taurus controversy refers to an ongoing political controversy starting in Summer 2023 surrounding the delivery of Bundeswehr Taurus cruise missiles to Ukraine. After the Russian invasion of Ukraine began in 2022, the Ukrainian government asked Germany in 2023 to deliver the German-Swedish air-to-ground cruise missiles. In Spring 2024, the majority of the government and parliament, as well as many surveyed sections of the population, spoke out against the delivery of Taurus missiles to Ukraine. After the 2025 German federal election, the successor government maintained this position. As of March 2026, Germany's military aid to Ukraine still has not included any Taurus cruise missiles.

== Political positions ==
Olaf Scholz (SPD) was strongly opposed to the delivery of Taurus missiles to Ukraine during his time as German Chancellor. Like the Chancellor, many members of the SPD rejected its delivery; politicians from the Greens and the FDP as well as other sections of the SPD have called for its delivery. Among the opposition, the AfD and The Left party reject the delivery, while politicians from the Union parties agree. In mid-2023, the Ministry of Defense carried out a review to determine whether a range limitation was technically possible. In March 2024, former Federal President Joachim Gauck expressed support for the delivery.

=== German positions ===
==== Positions against Taurus delivery ====
In the Bundestag, the government factions (SPD, FDP, Greens) voted against the delivery on January 17, 2024, although the latter had spoken out in favor of it in the previous debate. However, the practice of fundamentally rejecting proposals from an opposition faction is common in the German political system across all party lines and at both federal and state level. A few days later, Chancellor Scholz justified his negative stance by saying that Germany should not be linked to the goals that such a system achieves "at any point or place." He expressed disdain over his belief that many politicians in favor of sending the weapons would not consider whether a delivery could lead to participation in war. He also stated that the kinds of military targeting and monitoring that the British and French were doing could not be done in Germany. Rolf Mützenich, the chairman of the SPD parliamentary group stated: "We have known for months, including from publications in the British media, that there may also be British soldiers in Ukraine for the weapon system delivered there. [...] A bogeyman is now being set up there". At the end of February 2024, however, Scholz specified that he also wanted to avoid a residual risk because the weapon, "if used incorrectly, can reach a specific target somewhere in Moscow." On March 18, 2024, former Chancellor Gerhard Schröder (SPD), a long-time friend of Vladimir Putin and pro-Russian lobbyist, supported the positions of Scholz and Mützenich.

In a survey in early March 2024, 61% of participating Germans disapproved of Taurus deliveries, representing an increase of nine percentage points since August 2023. According to the Politbarometer, only 29% of surveyed Germans were in favor of Taurus deliveries.

After his election as Chancellor in 2025, Friedrich Merz maintained the previous government's policy despite his earlier criticism of its refusal. In March 2026, he stated that due to Ukraine's advances in weapons technology, he no longer saw a need for the delivery (contrary to Ukrainian President Zelenskyy, who had stated the previous month that his country still needed Taurus cruise missiles). Merz said that his earlier demands as opposition leader had been based on the assumption that the Bundeswehr had a sufficient number of operational Taurus cruise missiles available.

==== Positions for Taurus delivery ====
On 21 February 2024, the chairwoman of the Defense Committee, Marie-Agnes Strack-Zimmermann (FDP), was the only coalition MP to vote in favor of a motion conducted by the Union faction that called on Chancellor Scholz to deliver the Taurus to Ukraine. The motion failed due to opposition from the traffic light coalition. On 12 March 2024, the Union faction threatened Scholz with an investigative committee of inquiry (de).

The Chancellor was criticized by various German and European parties, including former British Defense Minister Ben Wallace, French security expert François Heisbourg, and CDU politician Norbert Röttgen, for irresponsible handling of intelligence information. The British government denied, among other things, the Chancellor's statement that Great Britain was directly involved in the operation of deploying and target selection of Storm Shadow missiles, claiming that it was "the matter of the Ukrainian armed forces."

Security expert Gustav Gressel from the European Council on Foreign Relations found the Chancellor's argument that the Bundeswehr must be directly involved with operations in Ukraine to be inconclusive. The manufacturer, not the Bundeswehr, would be responsible for introducing the weapon system, which is what occurred with an export to South Korea.

Political scientist Thomas Jäger suspected that Scholz was aware of the invalidity and refutation of his argument, and that he held his position due to him possibly knowing something that he could not or would not explain to the public. Christian Mölling, deputy director of the German Council on Foreign Relations, suspected that the Chancellor's refusal was due to a lack of trust in Ukraine in its adherence to agreements on target selection. At the end of March 2024, five historians in the SPD publicly criticized the Chancellor's refusal.

=== Ukrainian positions ===
Ukraine first officially asked Germany to supply their armed forces Taurus cruise missiles in May 2023, and has since repeated the request several times without success.

=== Russian positions ===
The State Duma published a statement in March 2024 in which it classified a possible delivery of Taurus to Ukraine as a violation of the Two Plus Four Treaty, in which Germany committed itself to peace. The Duma appealed to the Bundestag not to agree to a delivery of Taurus to Ukraine and warned of an escalation of the military conflict if Germany delivered the Taurus cruise missiles to Ukraine. Vladimir Putin, however, claimed that a possible delivery of Taurus missiles would not change anything on the battlefield and stated that "They are trying to intimidate us" in reference to potential plans.

=== Voices from other countries ===
At the end of June 2024, former NATO Secretary General Anders Fogh Rasmussen called on Olaf Scholz to deliver the Taurus to Ukraine as soon as possible, stating that any further hesitation would not make Scholz a "peace chancellor", but instead a "chancellor of eternal war".

== Taurus wiretapping case ==
On February 19, 2024, a confidential conversation on the subject of Taurus and its possible use between high-ranking German officers was intercepted, presumably by Russia, and published in Russian media in early March 2024. The content, which was presumed to be considered classified and a state secret, included details on the missile's capabilities such as flight altitudes, preparation time for a mission, training options and duration for the Ukrainian armed forces, the installation of the Taurus on Ukrainian Sukhoi aircraft, target programming that included Russian ammunition depots and the Crimean Bridge as possible targets, and the outsourcing of support work on target programming to the arms company MBDA Deutschland GmbH. The participants also spoke about the Storm Shadow/SCALP system supplied by the British and French in cooperation with Ukrainians, as well as the number of operational Ukrainian carrier aircraft. In the conference call, it was also suggested that British and US personnel were in Ukraine: with Gerhartz stating that they had "several people on site". Furthermore, some content in the conversation contradicted Olaf Scholz's justification that no Taurus would be delivered because this would require the deployment of German soldiers to Ukraine. In April 2024, the head of the arms company Airbus Defence and Space, Michael Schöllhorn, also contradicted Scholz's claim.

== Possible weapon exchange with the United Kingdom ==
On March 9, 2024, the United Kingdom's Foreign Minister David Cameron introduced the idea of a weapons swap into the debate. In such an exchange, Germany would hand over Taurus cruise missiles to Great Britain, and London would in turn supply additional Storm Shadow missiles to Ukraine. Germany could thus indirectly support Ukraine without Taurus cruise missiles with their long range being delivered to the war zone. The Union faction in the Bundestag was skeptical about the idea. Defense policy spokesman for the CDU/CSU parliamentary group Florian Hahn stated that the best plan would be for Great Britain to supply its own system to Ukraine with Germany supplying Taurus cruise missiles. While Foreign Minister Annalena Baerbock stated on 10 March that this was an option, SPD leader Lars Klingbeil rejected a debate about a possible Taurus weapons swap.

== Political decision-making in the Bundestag ==
=== Special meeting of the Defense Committee ===
On 11 March 2024, the Defense Committee met to discuss the recording of the unsecured conference call between senior Air Force officers on the Taurus and the possible delivery of Taurus cruise missiles which had been published in Russia. In the secret part of the meeting, Inspector General of the German Armed Forces Carsten Breuer informed the MPs that the use of the Taurus is more complicated than many had assumed, and explained the technical and operational process of target data planning. This involves large and complex amounts of data that must be processed by special technical systems. However, these technical systems are only available to a limited extent, and the Taurus is one of the "most powerful weapons" with "quasi-strategic capabilities", meaning that granting them would endanger national defense. In response to the presentation, some MPs' "jaws dropped", and a person familiar with the proceedings reported that after Breuer's presentation, there was silence in the room with many MPS who usually made loud demands having no more questions. The military expert and former colonel of the German Army, Ralph Thiele, confirmed: "In fact, the Taurus delivery is not only about the provision of databases, but also about special technological equipment for programming the Taurus, which Germany then lacks for its own defense capability." Due to the release of this internal report by Breuer to the press, chairwoman Marie-Agnes Strack-Zimmermann announced prosecutorial investigations for breach of confidentiality. On Friday, 15 March, she confirmed that a formal complaint had been filed. On the same day, she had asked Parliamentary President Bärbel Bas to issue an "authorization for criminal prosecution on violation of official secrets and a special duty of secrecy."

=== Votes in the Bundestag ===
A request submitted by the Union parties in January 2024 to supply Taurus cruise missiles to Ukraine was rejected by a majority of the Bundestag. A repeat request submitted again by the Union parties in March 2024 was also rejected by a majority of the Bundestag.

On 14 and 15 March 2024, the CDU/CSU failed to pass a motion to deliver Taurus cruise missiles to Ukraine in the German parliament for the third time. During the Bundestag debate, some members of the CDU and CSU campaigned for the motion, while speakers from the SPD, the BSW, the AfD, and the Left spoke out against the delivery of the cruise missiles. SPD parliamentary group leader Mützenich supported Chancellor Scholz's decision not to deliver Taurus weapons and instead suggested that parliament draft ideas on "how to freeze the war and end it later." Of the 690 parliamentarians who took part in the vote, 495 of them voted against the motion. All parliamentary groups except the CDU/CSU voted against the Taurus delivery. Only 190 MPs were in favor, with the Union parliamentary group counting 197 MPs. There were five abstentions. 48 MPs from all political groups, groups and independents did not cast their votes.
