= Marion Schick =

German manager, politician and professor

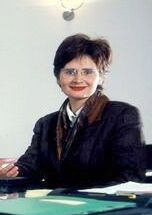

Minister of Education of Baden-Württemberg
- In office February 2010 – May 2011

Personal details
- Born: September 5, 1958 (age 68) Schrobenhausen, West Germany
- Party: Christian Democratic Union of Germany
- Education: LMU Munich; University of the Bundeswehr Munich (PhD)

Marion Schick (born September 5, 1958) is a German manager, politician and professor. From February 2010 to May 2011 she was Minister of Education of the German state of Baden-Württemberg. Before being named minister she served as president of the Munich University of Applied Sciences. Deutsche Telekom has appointed her as future chairman for human resources.

From 1977 to 1981, Schick studied education with economics at LMU Munich. From 1982 to 1983, she was a teacher trainee at a professional school and finished the state examination to become a teacher. From 1983 to 1987, she was a research assistant at the University of the Bundeswehr Munich and there also obtained a PhD in education.

From 1987 to 1990, she worked with human resources and management training of ADAC and Allianz and subsequently took over a position as head of marketing department at Rodenstock GmbH.

In 1993, she got a management chair at the Munich University of Applied Sciences. From 1999 to 2000, she served as the university's vice president and in the following year was named president and kept this position until 2008. From 2006 to 2008, she also served as head of the conference of the presidents of the Bavarian universities of applied sciences. She also was a member of the board of the Fraunhofer Society and head of human resources and legal issues.

In February 2010, Minister President of Baden-Württemberg Stefan Mappus of the Christian Democratic Union of Germany named her Minister of Education. She kept this position until the elections in May 2011, won by the German Green Party and the Social Democratic Party.
