= University of the German Federal Armed Forces =

The German Armed Forces (Bundeswehr) runs two universities—one in Munich, (University of the Bundeswehr Munich) and another one in Hamburg (Helmut Schmidt University)—which focus on the scientific work and the academic study of the German armed forces' officers. Unlike other nations' military academies, both universities only offer courses of study which have almost no relation to the military and correspond to courses at regular German universities.

All professors at both universities are civilians. The future officers, who must serve for at least 13 years (16 for pilots), obtain a bachelor’s or master's degree comparable to the academic degrees granted at the other universities in Germany. Students at the Federal Armed Forces Universities need at least four academic years to achieve the master's degree.

Since 2003, civilian students have also been admitted to study at the universities of the Federal Armed Forces, provided that spaces for enrollment are available and that industrial companies are willing to underwrite the costs.

The academic program at the universities of the Federal Armed Forces can be finished faster than at civilian universities because the curriculum contains about one third more content per year (trimesters instead of semesters are utilized). In exchange, the officers and officer candidates are fully paid and do not have to work in their free time.

== Study courses ==
- History of Science
- Pedagogy
- Political science
- Sports science
- Electrical engineering
- Civil engineering and Environmental science
- Computer science
- Aeronautical and Astronautical engineering
- Mathematical engineering
- Mechanical engineering
- Information systems
- Industrial engineering
- Computational Engineering
- Geodesy and Geoinformation
- Political economics and Social sciences
- Economics
- Business

== See also ==
- University of the Bundeswehr Munich
- Helmut Schmidt University
