= German Institute for Defence and Strategic Studies =

Government think tank

German Institute for Defence and Strategic Studies (GIDS)
- Formation: 30 June 2018 in Hamburg
- Founder: Ursula von der Leyen
- Headquarters: Hamburg
- Owner: Federal Ministry of Defence (Germany)
- Leader: Gary Schaal (Chairman)
- Website: https://gids-hamburg.de/

The German Institute for Defence and Strategic Studies (GIDS) is a strategy-oriented research institute in the portfolio of the German Federal Ministry of Defence, based in Hamburg in the Clausewitz Barracks. It is a cooperation between the Bundeswehr Command and Staff College and the Helmut Schmidt University (HSU) and is intended to serve as a think tank for the future of the Armed Forces of Germany. The Institute's board of directors is equally staffed by the Bundeswehr Command and Staff College and the Helmut Schmidt University.

The GIDS is intended to bridge the gap between basic research at the Helmut Schmidt University and the processing of military issues at the Bundeswehr Command and Staff College. HSU and GIDS are connected to the Faculty of Economic and Social Sciences via the "Network for Interdisciplinary Conflict Analysis" (NIKA).

The institute was founded on 30 June 2018 by the then Minister of Defence, Ursula von der Leyen.

German Navy staff officer, Frank Reininghaus has published various military analysts for GIDS In September 2022, Julian Pawlak was a member of GIDS and he told the New York Times about the vulnerability of the gas pipeline systems.

The GIDS published a paper in 2025 which stated that a critical approach to Chinese wind power projects was necessary.

== Mission ==
The institute's mission is to analyse problems and phenomena that are crucial to Germany's strategic capability in terms of security policy, and in doing so, to create a basis for advising decision-makers in the Bundeswehr and the Federal Government of Germany.

== Research areas ==
The research areas of the institute are:

- Economics and Ecology of Violence
- Dynamics and Typologies of Wars and Conflicts
- Culture and Identity in a Changing Security Environment
- Joint and Interdisciplinary Thinking and Acting from a Security Policy Perspective
- Military Strategy and Leadership in the 21st Century
- Strategic Partnerships

== Scientific Advisory Board ==
A scientific advisory board has been set up to support the institute. The task of this advisory board is to advise the institute's management, in particular with regard to the definition of research priorities and initiatives and their relevance to strategic consulting needs.
