= Carlo Masala =

German political scientist (born 1968)

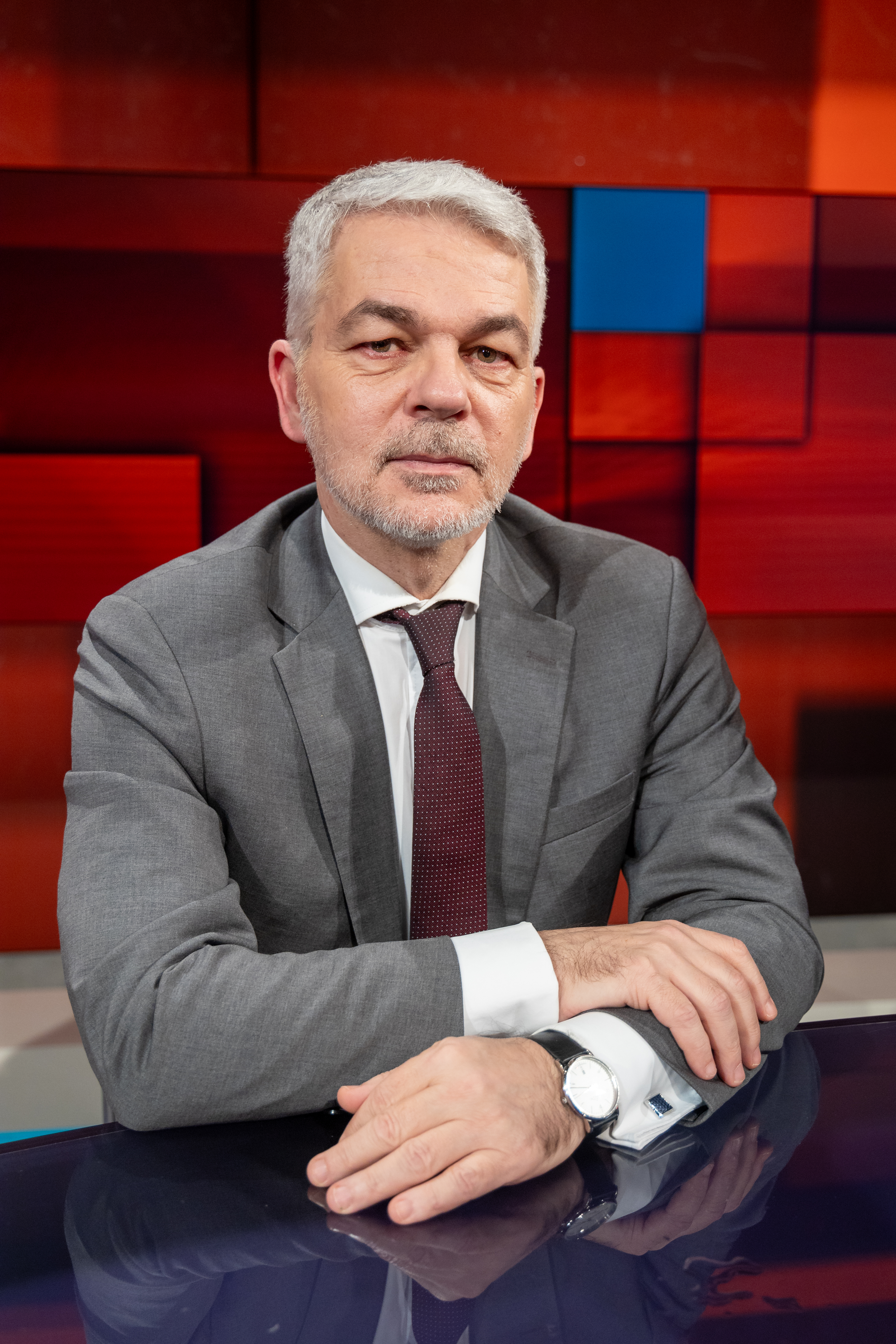
- Masala in 2023
- Born: 27 March 1968 (age 58); Cologne, West Germany
- Education: University of Cologne
- Known for: Podcast Sicherheitshalber
- Scientific career
- Fields: Political science
- Workplaces: University of the Bundeswehr Munich

Carlo Masala (born 27 March 1968) is a German political scientist, lecturer and researcher. He is professor of international relations at the University of the Bundeswehr Munich. He is also lecturer at LMU Munich and Munich School of Political Science of TU Munich.

Masla has become known to a wider audience through regularly appearances on political entertainment televions programs as an expert on the Russian invasion of Ukraine and by publishing popular scientific books of military strategic issues. A contributing factor is that he occasionally presents future scenarios in the media, like the Narva scenario.

Carlo Masala belongs to the school of Neorealism and has contributed to the resurgence in popularity of this cold war theory within the German-speaking community since the 2010s. More contemporary schools criticize Masala’s approaches as overly simplistic, and his perception of the world and humanity as one-dimensional.

== Early life ==
Masala was born in 1968 in Cologne to an Austrian mother and an Italian father. He grew up as an Italian in Germany in the Cologne district of Chorweiler, first in Seeberg and later in Pesch. As a child, he also lived for a few years in Sardinia. During his childhood and youth in Germany, Masala experienced racist exclusion, especially from classmates and local police officers.

Masala speaks fluent German, Italian, and English, and has a knowledge of the Sardinian language.

== Education ==
From 1988 to 1992, Masala studied political science as well as German studies and Romance studies at the University of Cologne and the University of Bonn. After completing his master's degree, he began work as a researcher in Cologne. In 1996, he earned his PhD from the Institute for Political Sciences and European Issues; his doctoral thesis focused on German-Italian relations. In 2002, he was awarded the post-doctoral Habilitation.

== Career ==
In 2003, Masala was temporarily employed as a professor at LMU Munich. In 2004, he moved to the NATO Defence College in Rome, where he was an assistant director of research in 2006–2007. In July 2007, Masala was named chair of international politics at the University of the Bundeswehr Munich.

== Scientific work ==
Masala considers himself a neorealist. His main research areas are international political theory, security politics, and transatlantic relations.

In 2013, he presented a German-language introduction to the theoretical approaches of Kenneth N. Waltz’s neorealism.

== Media appearances ==
Since the start of the Russian invasion of Ukraine in February 2022, Carlo Masala has had a massive presence in the German media. Although he was already known to a wider public both within expert circles and through the popular podcast "Sicherheitshalber", which he has been involved with since 2018 the "Zeitenwende" (watershed moment) propelled him to become one of the go-to commentators on German security policy.

Masala appeared regularly on polit-entertainment televions programs like Markus Lanz (ZDF) 40 times 2022-2026, maischberger (ARD) 18 times 2022-2026 and Maybritt Illner (ZDF). Masala travels in almost every week for some major TV production.

== Other activities ==
- Federal Academy for Security Policy (BAKS), member of the Advisory Board (since 2015)

== Publications ==
Popular sciences:

- Masala, Carlo (2025). Wenn Russland gewinnt: Ein Szenario [If Russia wins: a scenario] (in German) (2nd ed.). Munich: C. H. Beck. ISBN 978-3-406-82448-7.
- —— (2024). Warum die Welt keinen Frieden findet [Why the world does not find peace] (in German). Wien: Brandstätter Verlag. ISBN 978-3-7106-0705-9.
- —— (2023). Bedingt abwehrbereit: Deutschlands Schwäche in der Zeitenwende [Conditionally ready to defend: Germany's weakness in the Zeitenwende] (in German). Munich: C. H. Beck. ISBN 978-3-406-80039-9.
- —— (2022). Weltunordnung: Die globalen Krisen und die Illusionen des Westens [World disorder: global crises and the illusions of the West] (in German) (6th ed.). Munich: C. H. Beck. ISBN 978-3-406-79325-7.

Science:

- Carlo Masala, Frank Sauer (Publisher) (2017): Handbuch internationale Beziehungen. 2. Auflage. Springer VS, Wiesbaden 2017, ISBN 978-3-531-19917-7.
- Carlo Masala (2013): Kenneth N. Waltz. Einführung in seine Theorie und Auseinandersetzung mit seinen Kritiker. Nomos. 978-3-8487-0352-4
- Sebastian Enskat, Carlo Masala (2012): Got Change? – Kontinuität und Wandel in den transatlantischen Beziehungen seit dem Amtsantritt von Präsident Obama. In: Christoph Haas, Wolfgang Jäger: What a President Can - Barack Obama und Reformpolitik im Systemkorsett der USA. Nomos, 2012 doi
