= Joachim Schmillen =

German diplomat

Joachim Christoph Schmillen (born December 6, 1962, in Prüm, Germany) is a German diplomat and has been the current German Ambassador to Panama since 2023.

== Career ==
In 1983, Schmillen joined the German military as an officer candidate. From 1984 to 1988, he studied education and psychology (Diplom) at the University of the Bundeswehr Munich. After finishing his studies, Schmillen left the military and used to work for the members of the German Bundestag Alfred Mechtersheiner and later Vera Lengsfeld.

From 1991 to 1994, he used to work as scientific foreign and security policy coordinator of the Alliance '90/The Greens parliamentary group in the Bundestag. From 1994 to 1998, he was head of office and personal assistant to the chief of the parliamentary group in the German parliament, Joschka Fischer. When the latter was appointed foreign minister in 1998, Schmillen joined the German Foreign Ministry, again as Fischer's personal assistant and head of his office. From 2002 to 2003, he served as head of the policy planning staff of the foreign ministry. In 2003, he was appointed German Ambassador to Chile, in 2006, German Ambassador to Nigeria, and in 2011 to Peru, where he stayed until 2014. In 2014, he was assigned as German Ambassador to Jamaica. After completing his tenure there, he took leave from 2018 till 2023 and served as Vice President Global Affairs at the Caribbean Maritime University in Port Royal.

In September 2023, he took up the duties as German Ambassador in Panama.

== Publications ==
- Achim Schmillen: Das Fenster zum Angriff, die Entwicklung der Golfkrise: Kurzanalyse und Dokumentation. Wuppertal 1991.
- Achim Schmillen: Rüstungsplanung 1995 Mit „Krisenreaktionskräften“ gegen den neuen „Feind“. In W&F Wissenschaft und Frieden, 3/94, Münster 1994.
