= Helmut Schmidt University =

Military university in Hamburg, Germany

Coordinates: 53°34′04″N 10°06′26″E

- Helmut-Schmidt-Universität/Universität der Bundeswehr Hamburg
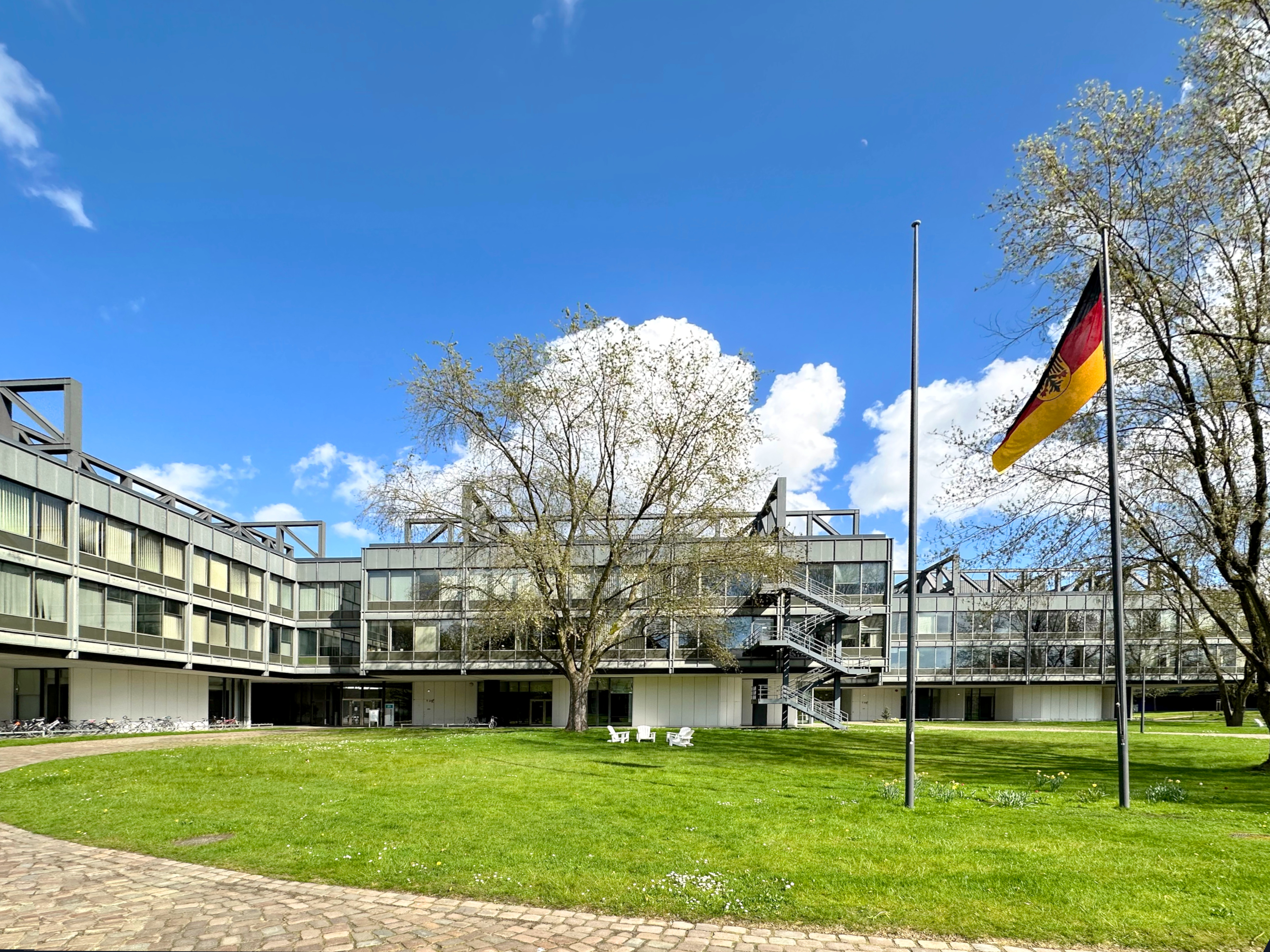
- Campus and main building
- Established: 1973
- President: Klaus Beckmann
- Academic staff: 462
- Students: 2545
- Location: Hamburg, Hamburg, Germany
- Website: www.hsu-hh.de

The Helmut-Schmidt-Universität/Universität der Bundeswehr Hamburg, located in Hamburg, Germany, is a German military research university. The university was founded in 1973 at the initiative of the then-Federal Minister of Defence, Helmut Schmidt. Teaching first started in the autumn of 1973. It is one of two universities that were established by the Bundeswehr to train and educate its future and current officers. The other one being the University of the Bundeswehr Munich.

In general, it is accessible only to officers and officer candidates of the Bundeswehr, hence its full name. However, since it started teaching, there have been cooperation agreements with allied countries, on the basis of which a handful of selected officers from these states have been able to study in Hamburg.

Since 2002 there has been a small number of civilian students at the university. A prerequisite for studying as a civilian at the Helmut Schmidt University is a business scholarship. These scholarships are usually awarded by foundations with close relationships to industry – thus, these students are at least indirectly being supported by their future employer, usually large companies. As of 2022 tuition costs are currently 2941 euros (humanities), 4403 euros (economics) or 3423 euros (engineering) per academic term.

Academic degrees and titles obtained at HSU are equivalent to those awarded by state universities and are equally valid, since the courses comply with the requirements of Hamburg's higher education legislation. The university is authorised to confer habilitations and doctoral degrees.

== History ==
=== Chronology of establishment ===
On 11 June 1970, the Federal Minister of Defense at the time, Helmut Schmidt, for whom the university was later named and who later would become chancellor of Germany, published a decree that a university be established for the purpose of schooling certain members of the German Federal Armed Forces. On 17 May 1971 the decree, passed a year earlier by Schmidt, was appraised.

The German Federal Armed Forces agreed 29 June 1972 to collaborate with Schmidt's ideas for the university. The agreement was finalised 3 October 1972 and legally concluded.

The first classes of students began schooling on 1 October 1973 and the first graduate left the university on 30 September 1976.

=== Presidents ===
Helmut Schmidt University shown within Hamburg

Since the beginning of the university in 1973, there have been nine presidents of the institution, including the current president, Klaus Beckmann, who has been in office since 2010.

Table of Presidents
Name	Beginning of Term of Office:	End of Term of Office:
Ellwein	1974	1976
Wässerling	1977	1977
Sanmann	1977	1984
Homuth	1984	1991
Strunk	1991	1998
Gerstein	1998	2004
Zeidler	2004	2010
Seidel	2010	2018
Beckmann	2018	present

Logo of the university before the renaming

=== Renaming ===
It was in the December 2003 that the University of the German Federal Armed Forces Hamburg was rechristened "Helmut Schmidt University / University of the German Federal Armed Forces Hamburg" to honour the man who passed the decree for the university's establishment. The idea of a university is his brainchild. Schmidt was present at the ceremony and was awarded an honorary degree.

== Organisation and courses ==
At the Helmut Schmidt University there is a specific organizational structure, in addition to the division between the areas of teaching and administration that is common to all universities, there is a military side, to accommodate the HSU's dual function as an educational establishment and a military authority for the students.

=== Academic division ===
The academic division takes care of teaching and research, to which end it maintains 4 faculties. The number of departments was designed so as to allow for intensive study through teaching in small groups, and for the pursuing of research at the same time.

- Faculty of Electrical Engineering: 13 professorships
  - Electrical Engineering
  - Parts of Industrial Engineering
- Faculty of Mechanical Engineering: 7 departments, 19 professorships
  - Mechanical Engineering
  - Computational Science and Engineering
  - Parts of Industrial Engineering
- Faculty of Humanities and Social Sciences: 9 departments, 28 professorships
  - Educational Sciences
  - History
  - Psychology
- Faculty of Economic and Social Sciences: 19 departments, 40 professorships
  - Business Administration
  - Economics
  - Political Science
  - Parts of Industrial Engineering
- Notes:
1. The course Industrial Engineering is not assigned to any one faculty, due to its mixed nature, but the Faculty of Electrical Engineering has taken the leading role in teaching it. The exam board consists of members of the 3 participating faculties in equal number.
2. The "ISA-Modul", with ISA standing for "Interdisziplinäre Studienanteile" (Interdisciplinary parts of study) is not assigned to a particular faculty. Its classes take place in all faculties. All ISA courses are coordinated by a research associate, who liaises with the teaching staff of the 4 faculties.

=== Student Body Regiment ===
The student body of the university is organised in the Student Body Regiment (German: "Studierendenbereich", short: StudBer, lit.: "student area"). The regiment is commanded by an officer of the rank of colonel or captain at Sea (NATO Rank Code OF-5). Apart from headquarters staff, they oversee 3 battalions (German: "Studierendenfachbereiche", short: StudFBer, lit.: "student subject area"). These are commanded by a Lieutenant Colonel or Commander (NATO Rank Code OF-4). To ensure parity between the branches, A battalion is usually commanded by a member of the navy (German: Marine), B battalion by a member of the air force (German: Luftwaffe) and C battalion by a member of the army (German: Heer). They usually also hold the title of Senior Branch Officer (i.e. Senior Naval/Air Force/Army Officer on Campus).

- A Battalion: Engineering
- B Battalion: Educational Sciences, History, Psychology
- C Battalion: Political and Economic Sciences

Each battalion consists of several companies (German: "Studierendenfachbereichsgruppen", short: StudFBerGrp, lit.: "student subject area groups"), commandend by an army or air force captain or a naval lieutenant (NATO Rank Code OF-2). In the course of the reforms of army training and the correspondingly higher student numbers in 2007 and 2008, further company commanders were added for the period 2007–2011 and again in 2019. A battalion currently has 5 companies, B battalion has 8 companies and C battalion has 9. Each company has between 100 and 150 student officers and cadets. Apart from the administrative management of the soldiers, the Student Body Regiment undertakes the military training and advanced education of their personnel, in order to hone individual common core skills.

=== Studying ===
The academic year at the HSU usually begins on 1 October. The officers and officer candidates are generally posted to the university a week before that date. An orientation week takes place first, during which the students may settle into their accommodation and receive an introduction to studying at the HSU from the more advanced students.

In contrast to the semester format usually practised in Germany, a year at the HSU is divided into 3 terms (trimesters) which means that it consists not of a winter and summer semester, but of autumn, winter and spring terms, 3 blocks of 3 months each. There are no classes in the summer quarter (1 July – 30 September). This period may be used for performing required periods of practical training and internships, and for holidays.

Exams are taken at the end of every term, and test the material that was studied in that term. In a few cases, exams at the end of a term may concern the material of more than one term. For the purpose of revision, one or two weeks in mid-December, late March and late June may be devoid of classes.

Due to the short length of revision time and the fact that all the exams are "en bloc", resits are greatly feared by the students, particularly the engineering students. Resit exams occur during the exam block of the next term, and in this way a "bow wave" of an ever-increasing number of exams to take can accumulate, which may be very difficult to remain on top of.

The standard period of study for the master's degree (the standard degree) is 4 years. A Bachelor's degree can be obtained in 3 years. The maximum period of study is 4 years, which means that one's Master's thesis must be submitted on 30 September of the 4th year of study at the latest. The study period may only be extended over 4 years with the permission of the Personnel Office of the Bundeswehr, and even then, one requires a certificate from the university stating that the student is likely to successfully complete his or her studies in the near future.

After completion of one's studies, that is after one has submitted one's final dissertation, the officer will return to a post in the army or the fleet relatively quickly, according to availability of vacant posts, the officer's leave entitlement and course plans. The award of the study diplomas always occurs in mid-October in a formal ceremony. As part of the graduation ceremony, the Böttcher-Preis, founded by the Hamburg businessman Johann Max Böttcher, is awarded to the highest-performing students of each year. Some alumni officers will return to their alma mater as researchers or doctoral students.

=== Facilities ===
The maintains some central facilities. These include the computer centre, the language centre, the media centre, and the Centre for Technology-Assisted Education (Zentrum für technologiegestützte Bildung: ZTB). A further facility is the library of the HSU. According to the library ranking list "Bibliotheksindex" (BIX), it has been amongst the best libraries in Germany for years. The library primarily exists to support the teaching and research of the HSU, but is also accessible to the general public. There is a cooperation with the German Institute for Defence and Strategic Studies (GIDS), together with the Bundeswehr Command and Staff College.

== Research focus ==
In Mechanical Engineering, one of the areas of research is in automotive engineering. 7 professorships work on projects in this area, including: Acoustics, Propulsion, Computer-aided engineering, Chassis, Production engineering, and Simulators.

For example, a hybrid drive unit is being researched for industrial trucks in cooperation with industry.

In Electrical Engineering, one of the areas of research is telecommunications, which includes: Audio coding, Wireless transmission systems, and Video recognition systems.

In educational sciences, the focus is on the areas of professional and organizational education, adult education and history. The establishment of a uniform German Qualifications Framework in the context of the European Qualifications Framework may be traced back in no small part to the work of the professor for professional and organizational education in the working group of the Federal Ministry for Education and Research, through expert advice and support.

In economic and management sciences, the emphasis is on logistics, business administration and economics, and political science. Gender topics have also been researched for years.

== Student life ==
=== Campus and accommodation ===
The HSU is designed as a campus university, and its campus in the Wandsbek district consists of 3 parts. Studying activities take place on the premises of the former Douaumont barracks on the Holstenhofweg in Hamburg-Jenfeld. The university administration is located here, as well as all departments and faculties, lecture theatres and laboratories and central facilities; it also contains sports facilities, the canteen and the management of the Student Division. Students of Engineering are accommodated here in 10 quite modern-looking residential buildings. South of the BAB 24, on the premised of the former Hanseatic barracks in the Stoltenstraße in Horn, is the accommodation for students of humanities and social sciences, and economics, and the medical facility. A third residence, rapidly constructed, is located since 2007 on the Jenfelder Allee and will be used until 2010. In addition, from 2007 to 2010, flats will be rented on the private market, in order to absorb the overload of students, which is due to the unusually well-attended years of 2007 and 2008. In the private flats, 2 to 3 students will be accommodated together. In principle, every student receives a single room with area of 14 to 20 m^{2} (151 to 215 sq ft), mostly with en-suite bathroom and toilet. During the time of higher than usual student numbers however, there will inevitably be some instances where 2 students share a larger room. Residents may cook in the shared kitchens, where the social life between studies and the Hamburg night life will take place. Due to structural changes in military training, several external residences had to be acquired including the former Lettow-Vorbeck Barracks, which is now used by the Federal Police (Bundespolizei). Another facility frequented by students and staff is the casino, the officer's club of the HSU (not a gambling establishment), located opposite the campus.

=== Financing ===
Whilst studying, the soldiers are paid according to their rank and length of service, sometimes including a residence allowance and a family allowance. They pay a fixed fee for their accommodation, which is waived if the student takes up a private residence.

=== Leisure activities and nightlife ===
Due to the quite strict study plan, compared with public universities, it is often not easy for students to pursue leisure activities. In the course of the years, however, many different clubs and societies have been formed, to enable leisure activities without clashing with study obligations.

One large event in the academic year is the "TAF ("Trimesteranfangsfeier" or "Start of term ceremony"). This takes place annually to greet the new students. It is organized by the members of the "Studentischer Konvent" and enjoys widespread popularity. The Studentischer Konvent is the students' representation at the HSU. The offers first-term students a possibility to get to know each other, and more advanced students the possibility to swap tales from their holidays.

Further events are organized in the faculties. These include:

- "WI-Party" (last weekend of October, organized by the senior year of engineering students, with about 900 guests the largest closed event at the HSU)
- "Päd-Party" (mid- to late June, an open-air party in the Douaumont area, the home of the engineering students, organized by Education Sciences students)

=== Conditions of enrollment ===
There are several conditions of enrollment which are strictly observed at the university.

In general, studying at the HSU entails a mandatory service of 12 years as an officer in the Bundeswehr. Since 2008, that time has been increased to 13 years, in response to changes in the education caused by the introduction of the Bachelor/Master system. To join the officer corps, a 3-day selection process must be successfully completed at the officer candidates selection centre in Köln-Porz at the Mudra barracks. Depending on which service branch and which specialty one chooses, one will complete the requisite military training with that unit, before being posted to the university and completing the academic education there, which is a part of the training for becoming an officer.

The educational requirement for attending the HSU is a general higher education entrance qualification that is recognized by the law on higher education of the Free and Hanseatic City of Hamburg.

=== Military aspects of student life ===
Prior to their studies, soldiers must train at one of the three respective Officer Training school: for the Army in Dresden /('OSH'), for the Air Force in Fürstenfeldbruck ('OSLw') and for the Navy in Flensburg ('MSM').

During their stay at the HSU, military personnel are required to complete certain standard procedures every year. These include:

- 6/12 km marches on foot with 15 kg backpack
- German Sports Badge
- Basic Fitness Tests
- NBC Training
- First Aid Training
- Small Arms Training

On occasion:

- political education
- Training courses (such as MOUT etc.)
- Military ceremonies (such as changing of Commandants etc.)

== See also ==
- Education in Hamburg
- List of universities in Germany
- University of the German Federal Armed Forces
- University of the Bundeswehr Munich
