= Karl Sell =

Karl Christian Heinrich Sell (born 1907 in Kiel, died 14.06.1982) was a German orthopedic surgeon and the founder of the discipline of manual medicine or chirotherapy.

Sell established the first school of chirotherapy in Neutrauchburg near Isny in 1953. Chirotherapy as practised by Sell was partly based on his experience as a military surgeon and on established practices within chiropractic and osteopathy. It is distinguished from chiropractic and osteopathy by being part of rational-critical scientific medicine. His work resulted in the recognition of chirotherapy as a medical specialty by the German Medical Association in 1976. The original school in Neutrauchburg is now named the Karl Sell Medical Seminary (Ärtzteseminar Dr. Karl Sell).

Sell received the Ernst von Bergmann Plaque from the German Medical Association in 1978.
