= AnnMarie Thomas =

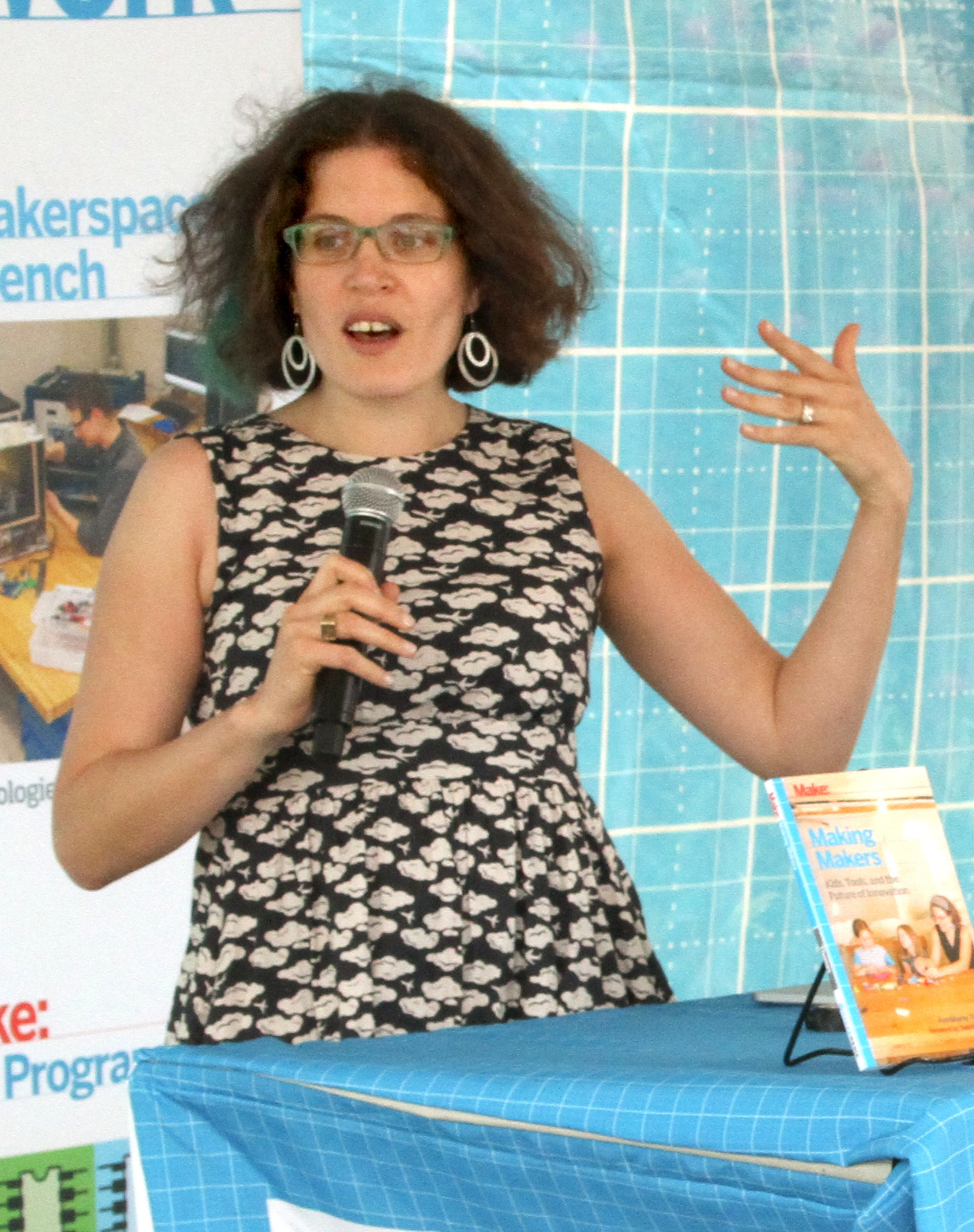
AnnMarie Thomas in 2015

AnnMarie Thomas is a mechanical engineer, author, blogger, and advocate for early engineering education. She received her Bachelor of Science degree in ocean engineering from Massachusetts Institute of Technology (2001) and went on to attain both an M.S. (2002) and Ph.D. (2006) in mechanical engineering from the California Institute of Technology. She has her certification in sustainable design from Minneapolis College of Art and Design (2012). She is currently associate professor in the School of Engineering, the Schulze School of Entrepreneurship, and the Opus College of Business at the University of St. Thomas in Saint Paul, Minnesota. Her research interests include engineering pedagogy and education for PK-12 students, design for aging populations, as well as synthetic jet propulsion.

Thomas is the founder and director of the Playful Learning Lab at the University of St. Thomas, where she leads students in exercises to understand the "playful side of engineering". She has also developed Squishy Circuits, an initiative to engage children in exploring electronics using play dough. This initiative outlines the process of making conducting and insulating dough and how to build circuits from these materials. Speaking of the project Thomas said:

It's been really fun since we put them up where they have gone. We had a mom in Utah who used them with her kids, science researchers in the UK, curriculum developers in Hawaii. So I'd encourage you all to grab some play dough and start playing. We don't usually think of our kitchen as an electronics lab and little kids as circuit designers, but maybe we should.

She describes engineering as a "fine art", and maintains that a positive attitude toward the possibilities for women in engineering is essential in creating a greater gender balance in the field.

Thomas is the author of a book, Making Makers: Kids, Tools, and the Future of Innovation, published by Maker Media Press in 2014. She has presented at a number of conferences and through Ted talks on inspiring young scientists (with play and other kinds of making). On her blog AnnMarie Thomas- Making Makers she has written about the challenges she has faced as a woman and mother working in engineering.
