= Annmarie O'Riordan =

Irish singer-songwriter (born 1990)

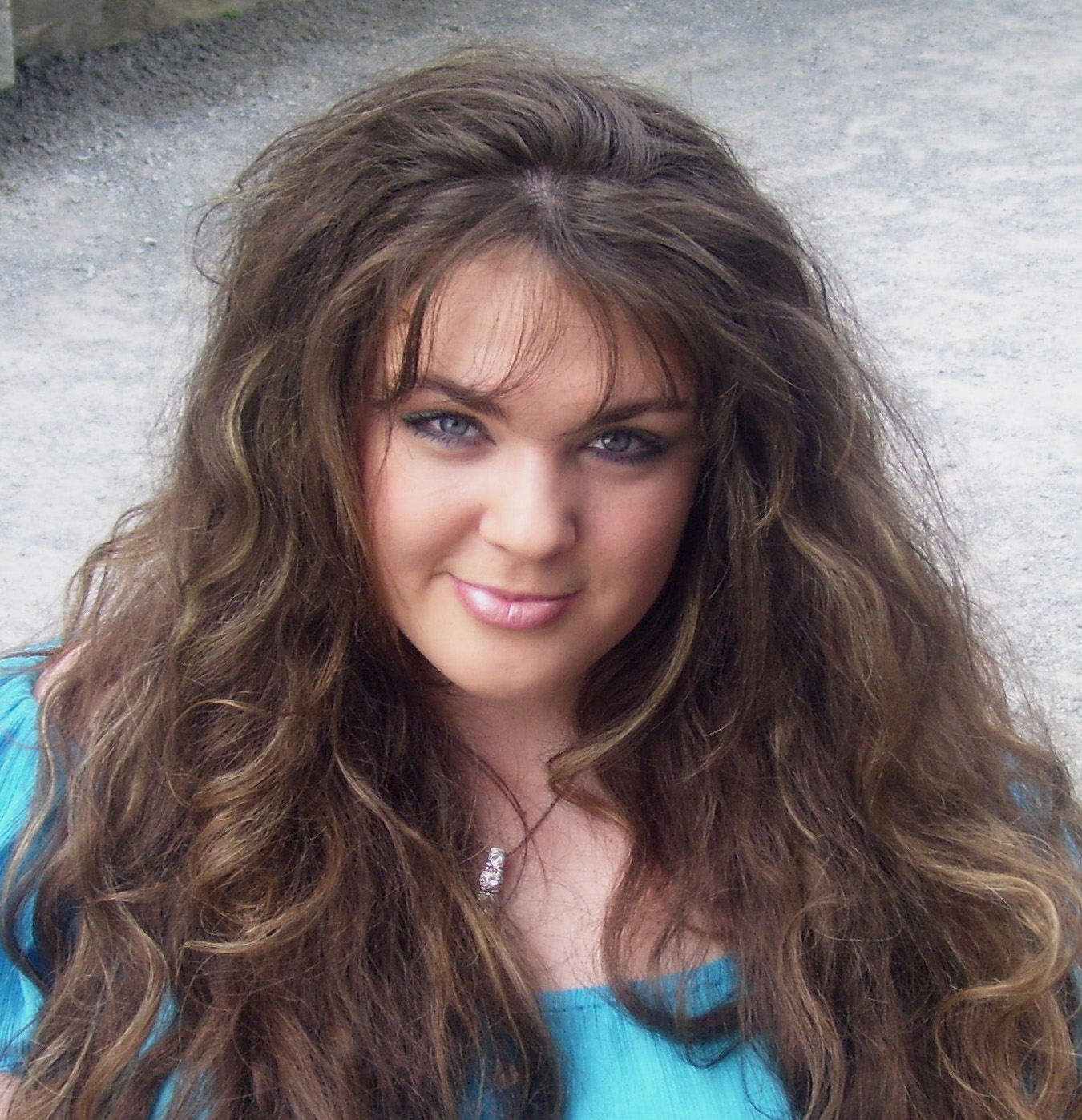
- Annmarie O'Riordan
- Born: Annmarie O'Riordan; 15 August 1990 (age 36); Duhallow, County Cork, Ireland
- Years active: 2003-onwards

Annmarie O'Riordan (born 15 August 1990, in Duhallow in County Cork) is an Irish singer (singer-songwriter).

She was born to Humphrey O'Riordan and Eileen Creedon O'Riordan, and her musical interest were early encouraged by her parents. Aged seven, O'Riordan joined the Irish cultural organisation Comhaltas Ceoltóirí Éireann (CCÉ) and its school för music in Millstreet in Cork. She participated in various competitions and recorded her first song aged 12 on an album published by CCÉ. While still at school, in Millstreet Community School, O'Riordan recorded her first album Harmony Handed Down in 2003. She went on to further studies at University College Cork during which she recorded her third album as well as gave her first solo concert at the Royal Theatre in Castlebar in County Mayo. O'Riordan has a teaching degree at Mary Immaculate College in Limerick.

In 2009 O'Riordan was appointed Best Newcomer at The World Fleadh and went on her first US tour in 2010 and later in Europe. Her fourth album, Song for the Journey, was released in 2011 and her fifth album, The Joys of my Heart, in 2016.

In 2013, O'Riordan performed the Irish national anthem, Ámhrán na bhFiann, prior to the semi-finals in the All-Ireland Senior Football Championship. She has also released a charity album for the Irish Cancer Society, Twas the Night (2015). She went on a smaller tour in Canada in November 2015.

== Rewards ==
- 2009: Best Newcomer Horizon Award, Irish Music Awards, The World Fleadh

== Discography ==
- 2003 – Harmony Handed Down
- 2005 – Melody in Harmony
- 2008 – Ireland – Love of my Heart
- 2011 – Song for the Journey
- 2012 – The Joys of my Heart
- 2015 – Twas the Night
