= Annemarie Huste =

German-American chef

- Born: May 30, 1943; Ulm, Württemberg, Germany
- Died: October 19, 2016; East Islip, New York, United States
- Culinary career
- Previous restaurant(s): Annemarie’s Dining Room

Annemarie Huste (1943–2016) was a German-American chef who worked for, amongst others, as private chef to Jacqueline Kennedy between 1964 and 1968. She subsequently worked as an executive chef and a cookbook author.

== Early life ==
Annemarie Huste was born in Ulm, Württemberg, Germany, on May 30, 1943, to Karl and Annemarie (née Bass) Huste. She began working as a shoe salesperson in Germany, but signed up with an agency and moved to the United States to work in the household of Gregory Callimanopulos in New York City. She learned to cook, but after six months sought to move on.

== Culinary career ==
She then worked for Billy Rose as a chef, after he asked her to make chocolate mousse Normandy. Huste was not aware of the recipe, but agreed and went to the local library and took out a cookbook by Dione Lucas. This was Rose's preferred version of the dish. Huste was hired as private chef for Jacqueline Kennedy in 1964, after the former First Lady of the United States had moved to the city from Washington, D.C. On her first day, Huste was required to cook a meal for a large number of the Kennedy family. Huste would accompany the Kennedy family as they travelled, including spending summers in Hyannis Port, Massachusetts.

After Huste worked with Weight Watchers in 1968 on the article Jackie Kennedy’s Gourmet Chef Presents Her Weight Watchers Recipes, Kennedy's representatives tried to prevent publication as it gave away some of Kennedy's private information. Huste spoke to reporter Maxine Cheshire for The Washington Post a few weeks later without permission from Kennedy. As well as providing further private information, Cheshire's article also compared Huste to Julia Child and claimed that a television series and cookbook were in progress. Huste was immediately fired as a result of the further disclosure of information. Although neither a cookbook or television show were in production at the time of the article, as a result Annemarie's Personal Cookbook was published during the following October, and began appearing on television.

After leaving the Kennedy household, Huste became executive chef for both The Saturday Evening Post and the Condé Nast magazine Gourmet. In 1972, she opened a cookery school at her home in Murray Hill, Manhattan. Huste opened a catering shop called the Great Take-Out with businessman Joseph Baumer, which she ran for four years. Huste then turned the dining room of her home into a private party space called Annemarie's Dining Room, which she ran until 2009. A times, various dignitaries were honored at dinners held at her home, including Secretary-General of the United Nations Kofi Annan and former Vice President of the United States Al Gore.

== Personal life and death ==
Huste returned to visit her brother Lothar's family in Ulm, usually around twice a year. Her nephew Michael joined her in New York for several years during the early 2000s, where he also became a chef. In later life, she was diagnosed with Alzheimer's disease and died from complications on October 19, 2016. Huste was 73 years old.
