= Central Park (Pittsburgh) =

Baseball venue in Pennsylvania, USA

- Interactive map of Central Park
- Location: Chauncey Street and Humber Way; Hill District; Pittsburgh, Pennsylvania
- Coordinates: 40.447072°N 79.972118°W
- Owner: Alexander M. Williams (1920-25); Sell Hall (1925)
- Surface: grass

Construction
- Opened: Summer 1920
- Demolished: 1925
- Architect: Louis Arnett Stuart Bellinger

Tenants
- Sell Hall’s American Giants (Ind.) (1920); Pittsburgh Keystones (NNL) (1921-1922)

Central Park was a baseball venue located in the Hill District of Pittsburgh, Pennsylvania, from 1921–1925. The stadium was the first black-owned, controlled and managed baseball park in the city.

The ballpark served as the home of the Pittsburgh Keystones of the Negro National League. Officially named Central Amusement Park, the field's construction was commissioned in 1920 by Keystones' owner Alexander M. Williams and was designed by the prominent African-American architect Louis Arnett Stuart Bellinger, who would later design Greenlee Field for the Pittsburgh Crawfords.

The ballpark was on a block bounded by Humber Way (north/northwest, third base); buildings and Junilla Street (northeast/east, left field); Hallett Street (southeast/south, right field); and Chauncey Street (southwest/west, first base). Across Humber were buildings and then Wylie Avenue. Well south of Hallett was a larger thoroughfare named Centre Avenue. Newspapers often gave the location as Wylie, Chauncey and Centre.

After the Keystones folded after their 1922 season, Williams lost his savings, and by 1924 he had sold the park to Sell Hall. Central Park was sold again and turned into a “summer dancing pavilion.”

In 2012, Central Park was denied an historical marker by the Pennsylvania Historical and Museum Commission. According to the Commission, the venue was seen as a local or regional interest rather than a national and the state already had several other markers commemorating the Negro leagues.

The ballpark site is now occupied by a public park.
