= Annemarie Oestreicher =

German politician (1875–1945)

Member of the Prussian Landtag
- In office 1921–1932
- Constituency: East Prussia

Personal details
- Born: Annemarie Hinze; December 14, 1875 Berlin, German Empire
- Died: 1945 (aged 69) Ravensbrück concentration camp, Nazi Germany
- Occupation: Politician; clerk; assistant nurse; dentist; author

Annemarie Oestreicher (born Annemarie Hinze: 14 December 1875 – 1945) was a German politician. She died following her internment, aged 69, in the Ravensbrück concentration camp although the precise circumstances of her death remain unknown.

== Life ==
Annemarie Hinze was born in Berlin. Her father was a businessman. She trained for clerical work and then, till 1910, worked as an assistant nurse and as a freelance "dentist". Her first husband was a commercial director with Siemens-Schuckert. She came to politics, and membership of the Social Democratic Party (SPD) thanks to her second husband who became editor in chief of the "Königsberger Volkszeitung" (" Königsberg People's Newspaper"). By 1921 she was describing herself not as a nurse or a dentist but as a "housewife". During the early 1920s she also worked as an author.

She was elected a member of the Prussian parliament ("Landtag") in 1921, representing an electoral district in East Prussia and dividing her time between Berlin and Königsberg. By this time she was a widow. Her political focus was on health, the arts, agriculture and questions involving farm workers. She also served as a member of the Prussian Regional Health Council. She continued to sit as a member of the Landtag till 1932, after which she settled in Osterode, to the south of Königsberg.

After the Nazis came to power she moved back to Berlin. On 20 July 1944 there was a plot to assassinate the leader which came close to success. Government authorities had already prepared a list of former politicians from the Weimar years to be rounded up in the event of intensified domestic opposition. The mass arrest was implemented on the night of 22/23 August 1944. There being no longer significant numbers of former Communist Party politicians at liberty in Germany, roughly 4,000 former officials and members of mainstream centre and left-wing "Bourgeois" parties were detained. Annemarie Oestreicher was one of them. Many of the detainees were released after a few weeks, but others, including Oestreicher, were taken to the Ravensbrück concentration camp. It was here, under circumstances that have never become clear, that she died, probably early in 1945.
