= Annemarie Wright =

Annemarie Wright (born 19 July 1979) is an English artist from Cambridgeshire. She is best known for her portrait of Tony Blair created using the handwritten names of fallen British soldiers from Iraq and Afghanistan, titled Their families have been told. The web page for Wright's portrait of Stephen Fry received 8,000 hits in two hours after being mentioned by Fry on Twitter.

Wright has exhibited in numerous art shows worldwide since her career began, including the 2013 London Art Fair. Wright held her first Solo exhibition at London's Woolff Gallery in March 2011.

== Response from the public ==
Wright's portrait of Blair caused a great deal of controversy from the parents of the soldiers who died. Carol Jones, mother of 31-year-old sergeant John Jones, who was killed whilst serving in Iraq in 2005, said "I hate Tony Blair and I hold him responsible for my son’s death, but I don’t want his name put on Tony Blair’s face".

The Blair portrait is part of a growing collection of handwritten images by Annemarie called "Scandals – art that rocked the world", which also contains a picture of the Twin Towers created using the names of the victims that died in the 9/11 terror attack (which is featured on the 9/11 Memorial Site) and a picture of Michael Jackson made up of child abuse allegations.

== Other notable works ==
In 2012, Wright completed an artwork of David Cameron based on public responses to the question, What Do you Think of David Cameron ?. The work was exhibited in Number Nine The Gallery during the Conservative Party Conference 2012, held in October in Birmingham. The work has since been purchased by an unnamed member of the House of Lords, after being exhibited as part of London Art Fair in 2013.

In April 2015, Wright featured in the BBC News when Natalie Bennett of the Green Party (UK) unveiled handwritten portraits of herself and other political party leaders David Cameron, Nick Clegg, Ed Miliband and Nigel Farage created of public opinions from Twitter and other forms of social media.

== Work in historic venues ==
Wright's work has hung in the reception of Abbey Road Studios. The art features a handwritten list of artists that have recorded at the historic venue.

Another of Wright's works, an image of Boris Johnson, created using handwritten quotes, was featured in Westminster tube station as part of an Art Below exhibition in 2011.

Wright's artwork of Amy Winehouse was installed in the Adee Phelan salon in Birmingham in 2012. The image is a tribute to Winehouse, using the handwritten song lyrics from the artist's Frank and Back to Black albums.
