= Maybrit Illner (talk show) =

German political talk show

- Berlin Mitte (until 2007)
- Genre: Talk show
- Presented by: Maybrit Illner
- Country of origin: Germany
- Original language: German
- No. of episodes: 800+

Production
- Running time: 60 minutes
- Production company: Gruppe 5 Filmproduktion

Original release
- Network: ZDF; DW Deutsch
- Release: 14 October 1999

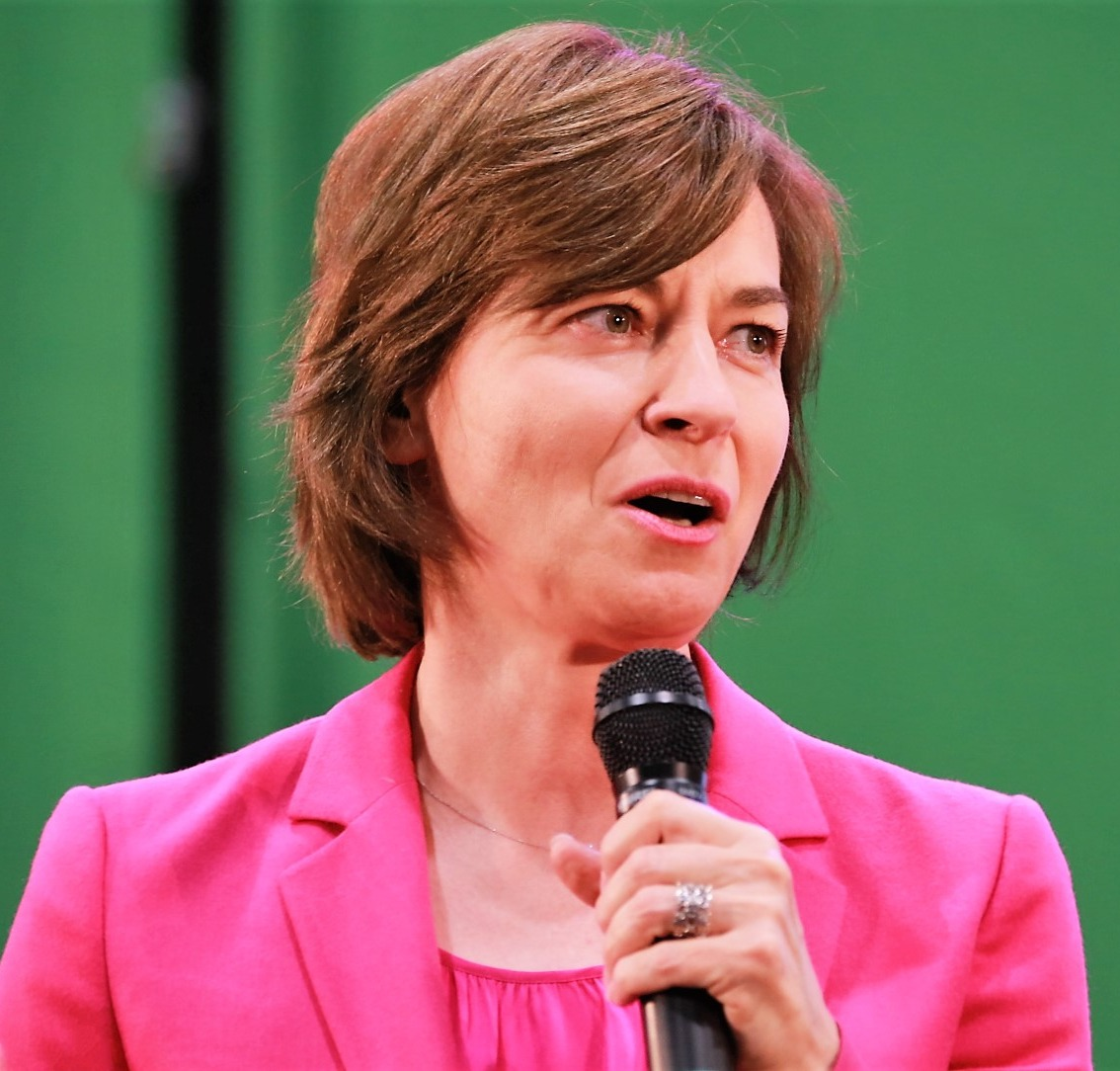
Host Maybrit Illner in 2016

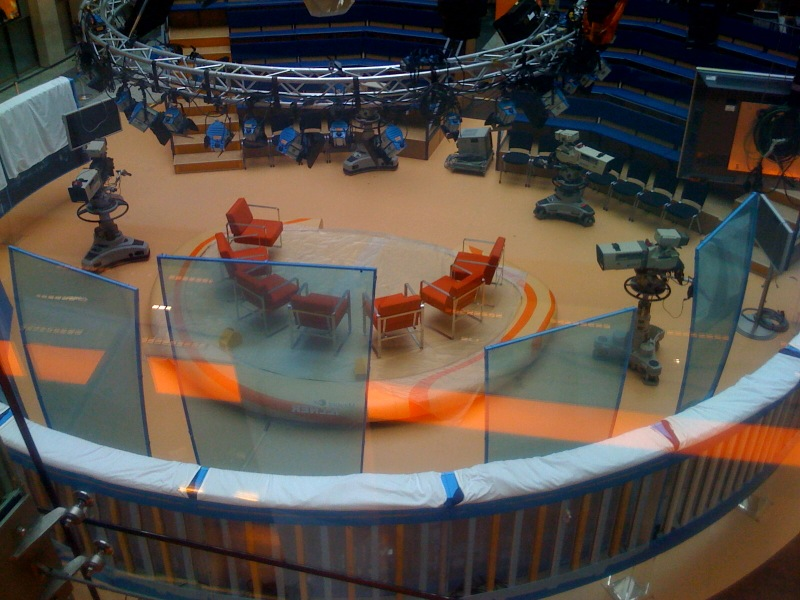
The old studio of Maybrit Illner in Zollernhof, Unter den Linden 36–38, Berlin (2008)

Maybrit Illner is a German political talk show on ZDF. The show, which was called Berlin Mitte until March 2007, has been broadcast on Thursdays since 14 October 1999 and hosted by Maybrit Illner. The show is produced by Gruppe 5 Filmproduktion.

== Overview ==
Maybrit Illner is dedicated to current political issues. The guests of the show are mostly politicians who often come from the federal politic of Germany.

The program got the name Berlin Mitte mainly because it is produced in the Berlin capital studio "Unter den Linden" in Berlin-Mitte, which is supposed to convey proximity to federal politics.

Illner's talk show was also extended by a quarter of an hour to 60 minutes with the renaming.

Since 31 March 2011, Maybrit Illner has been broadcast from a new studio and with a revised design. Around 20 freelance editors work for the ZDF editorial team, which is part of the main politics and current affairs department. Only the technical production of the show is outsourced to a production company.

According to industry information, Illner receives fees of a few hundred thousand euros per year as a host.

On 2 February 2017, Maybrit Illner had to stop for the first time due to illness. On this day, Matthias Fornoff took over the moderation of the show, also on 21 June 2018 because of a bereavement in her family. Bettina Schausten stood in for Illner on 30 November 2017.

In March 2022, Maybrit Illner presented the first major televised interview with Olaf Scholz as newly elected Chancellor; a second one followed in March 2023.

As of 2020, more than 800 episodes of the show have been produced.

== Awards ==
- 2019: Die Goldene Kartoffel (negative price) for its content
