= University of the Bundeswehr Munich =

German university

Coordinates: 48°04′49″N 11°38′17″E

- Universität der Bundeswehr München
- Former name: Hochschule der Bundeswehr München
- Motto: Sicherheit in Technik und Gesellschaft
- Type: Public
- Established: 1973
- Affiliations: IAMP
- President: Eva-Maria Kern
- Faculty: 915 (197 professors)
- Students: 3,825 (2022)
- Location: Neubiberg (Munich), Bavaria, Germany
- Campus: Sub-urban 140 hectares (350 acres)
- Website: www.unibw.de

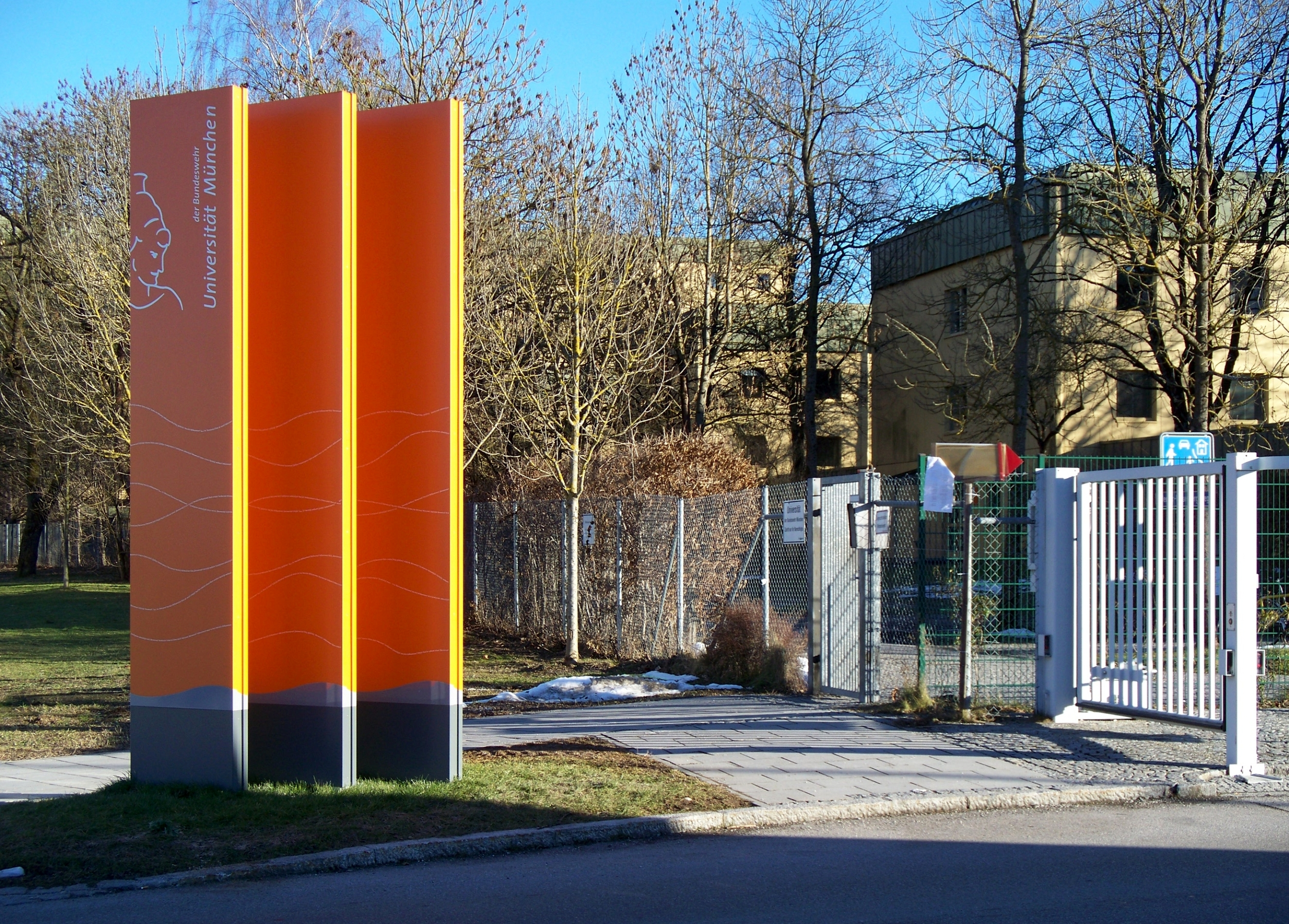
Entrance to the university

The University of the Bundeswehr Munich (German: Universität der Bundeswehr München, UniBw München) is one of two research universities in Germany at federal level that both were founded in 1973 as part of the German Armed Forces (Bundeswehr). Originally called Hochschule der Bundeswehr München, the institution was supposed to offer civilian academic education for military officers. As an uncommon feature amongst German universities, the University of the Bundeswehr Munich unifies a more theoretical research university division and a more practical-oriented College of Applied Sciences branch. Today, the university has an increasing number of civilian and international students. The academic year at the university is structured in "trimesters" and not the usual semester, to offer intensive studies with more credit points per year. Very capable students can therefore achieve a bachelor's and a master's degree within less than four years, while this would usually require five years. The University of the Bundeswehr Munich has well-established scientific research and forms part of two excellence clusters of the German government's university excellence initiative. The University of the Bundeswehr Munich is one of only very few campus universities in Germany.

== History ==
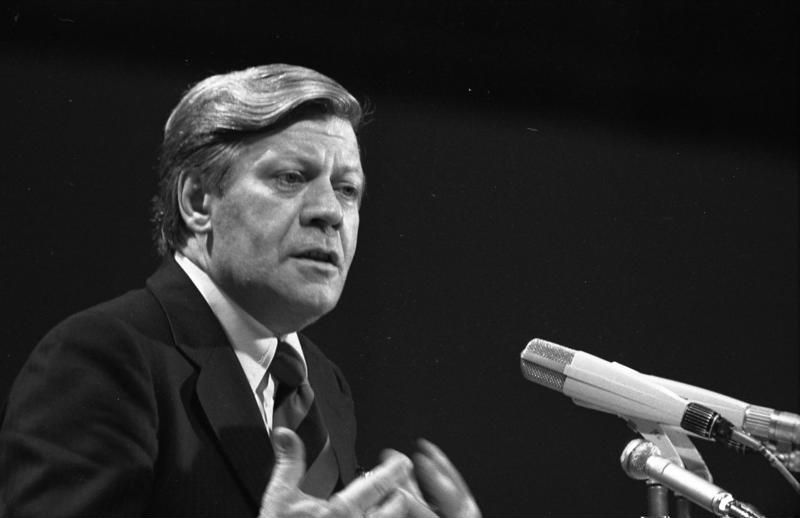
In 1970 the then minister of defence Helmut Schmidt initiated the reform process which led to the establishment of the two federal universities.

In 1970, the then-minister of defence Helmut Schmidt decided that the education of military officers in Germany had to be reviewed and had to include full academic studies. After one year, the Ellwein commission presented its proposal for the creation of two civilian colleges within the armed forces. Students should get fully recognised civilian degrees independent of their military profession, to have a higher qualified officer corps and more incentives to join the military. The idea was that students would have better conditions than at regular universities so that they could cope with a higher workload and study faster. After almost two years of discussions and the necessary legislative procedures, both universities could open. University education normally being a responsibility of the German states, the University of the Bundeswehr Munich and the Helmut Schmidt University are the only federal universities in Germany. With their innovative concepts, the Helmut Schmidt University and the University of the Bundeswehr Munich quickly became widely known as reform universities within the very traditional German university landscape. In the following years the universities had to establish their image and reputation and finally were accepted as full universities with the rights to award doctorate degrees as well as Habilitations to qualify university professors in the 80s. In the 1990s and 2000s, the university has started to open its teaching towards civilian students and to extend its international relations. While the researchers and doctorate students always used to be mainly civilians, the student body still had been purely military in the 90s. Today, the University of the Bundeswehr Munich has concluded partnership contracts with different major financial and industrial companies, which send students to the University of the Bundeswehr Munich. In the past few years different federal agencies have started to qualify their employees at the university. Since 2007, the University of the Bundeswehr Munich has changed its degree to the harmonized Bologna system. It has completely restructured its curriculums and awards bachelor's and master's degrees instead of the former German Diplom.

=== Presidents ===
- 1973–1974 Gerhard Wachter (temporary)
- 1974–1982 Horst von Engerth
- 1982–1990 Rudolf Wienecke
- 1990–1993 Jürgen von Kruedener
- 1993–1994 Rudolf Avenhaus (temporary)
- 1994–2005 Hans Georg Lößl
- 2005–2023 Merith Niehuss
- since 2023 Eva-Maria Kern

== Campus and student life ==
Hirschkäfer, one of the central buildings containing the main library

Most students live in the student dormitories on campus.

One of the central buildings containing the large Audimax lecture hall

University cafeteria

The university is located in Neubiberg in the south of Munich, Bavaria. There are S-Bahn and U-Bahn connections to Neuperlach Süd as well as three bus connections available. In addition to that, there are motorway exits at Neubiberg and Neuperlach, permitting fast access by car. The large campus used to host the Air Force officer school before, and also included a military airport. Former runways are still used for scientific testing of vehicles. Since the 1970s a large number of buildings have been built for teaching, scientific research and student housing. Most of the students live in modern individual student dormitories on the campus and next to the university buildings. There is currently a large renovation process ongoing on the campus: within the next years about € 220m will be spent on building activities. On campus students have access to different sports facilities like gyms, tennis courts and golf ranges. Different multinational engineering companies have their headquarters or important industrial facilities directly next to the campus, most notably Siemens, Infineon Technologies, Bosch and Siemens Household Appliances (BSH), and EADS facilitating frequent cooperation in research.

On campus all students (also the military ones) usually wear civilian clothes. Students can organize their activities as they want and attendance to lectures is mostly voluntary. On Wednesday afternoons there is regularly military or language training for soldiers. There are many possibilities for extracurricular activities within student initiatives and associations. International initiatives like the German-American, German-Israeli or German-Hispanic clubs as well as the Model United Nations Society play an important role on the campus. The students of each student dormitory usually organize a large party every year.

As a large part of the student body consists of military officers and officer candidates, sport is considered important on the campus. The sports center provides a variety of free courses for students – e.g. for different martial arts. There are a lot of sports facilities like gyms, different sports halls, a golf course, a large climbing wall, an indoor swimming pool, several tennis courts and other sports grounds. Furthermore, the university has a large military obstacle course which was used for the CISM world cup in 2009. There are different sports teams on the campus which also take part in the university championships.

Every student as well as the public has access to the more than one million volumes in the university library. The library is linked to the academic library network of Bavaria which allows interlibrary loans.

== Administration and organization ==
The organization of the University of the Bundeswehr Munich is similar to a regular university. 1,100 (non-military) employees, among them 163 full professors, serve the approximately 3,400 students. The university is led by a civilian president and three vice presidents. The incumbent president is Eva-Maria Kern. The administration is headed by the Chancellor. A difference to most other universities is that the structure of education and research is split up between a regular university part with seven university faculties and a Fachhochschule (College of Applied Sciences) part with three more faculties. Furthermore, the structure contains central services like the computing center, the large university library, a media center with state-of-the-art technology, a language service and the sport services. In addition to that the university has two further research institutes. The department for special services includes the Studium+ institute for interdisciplinary studies, the CASC center for postgraduate studies as well as some further services. Another difference to other universities is the military division which is responsible for the administration and training of military students. Decisions are made by the board, the extended board and the administration council (Senate and University Council). The university has about 850 non-scientific employees in addition to the about 570 scientific employees as well as additional military personnel.

== Academics ==
Similar to some other military run universities like the École Polytechnique the university only offers civilian study courses. The contents generally have no relation to the military and correspond to courses at regular German universities. Bachelor's and Master's studies in total consist of 400 ECTS credit points. Due to this there also is a small number of highly gifted civilian students who are sponsored by industrial and financial companies like Allianz, Bosch or Munich Re. In addition to that other German ministries and federal institutions like Bundesnachrichtendienst also educate some of their employees at the university. In cooperation with George C. Marshall European Center for Security Studies a course of studies for senior leaders (International Strategic Studies) has been introduced. The university also has international students and offers individual mentoring and tutoring programmes. The University of the Bundeswehr Munich has concluded partnership contracts with an increasing number of international universities. Furthermore, it is possible for civilians to receive a doctorate or to qualify as a university lecturer (Habilitation). All of the professors are civilians, and the number of professors per student is significantly higher than at regular German universities. Thus in general the conditions for teaching are better. In autumn 2009 the university introduced the first military-related engineering course of study called Defence Engineering, which is solely dedicated to civilian students from industrial companies and federal institutions. Military students of the university usually only have a maximum of 4 years to pass their master's within the intensive studies with more content. If they do not finish their bachelor's after 2 1/4 years with the necessary grades, they cannot proceed. As the studies have to be finished in a shorter time than at common German universities, the academic year consists of three trimesters instead of the normal two semesters.

Jan	Feb	Mar	Apr	May	Jun	Jul	Aug	Sep	Oct	Nov	Dec
winter trimester			spring trimester			summer modules, internships etc.			autumn trimester		

== Study courses ==
The university has restructured its courses of study according to the Bologna treaty and offers bachelor's and master's degrees as well as doctoral and postdoctoral studies. The University of the Bundeswehr Munich offers normal research university courses of studies as well as a few more practical oriented Fachhochschule (University of Applied Sciences) study courses. In total there are 37 Bachelor's and master's degree programmes at the University of the Bundeswehr Munich.

=== The University ===
- Civil Engineering & Environmental Studies (Bachelor of Science, Master of Science, doctorate, habilitation)
- Electrical Engineering & Information Technology (Bachelor of Science, Master of Science, doctorate, habilitation)
- Computer Science (Bachelor of Science, Master of Science, doctorate, habilitation)
- Cyber Security (Master of Science)
- Intelligence and Security Studies (Master of Arts/Master of Science)
- Aerospace Engineering (Bachelor of Science, Master of Science, doctorate, habilitation)
- Political Science & Social Sciences (Bachelor of Arts, Master of Arts, doctorate, habilitation)
- Economics & Organizational Sciences (Bachelor of Science, Master of Science, doctorate, habilitation)
- Business Information Systems (Bachelor of Science, Master of Science, doctorate, habilitation)
- Educational Science, in particular Intercultural, Media & Adult Education (Bachelor of Arts, Master of Arts, doctorate, habilitation)
- Sports Science (Bachelor of Science, Master of Science, doctorate, habilitation)
- Mathematical Engineering (Bachelor of Science, Master of Science, doctorate, habilitation)
- Psychology (Bachelor of Science, Master of Science, doctorate, habilitation)

=== College of Applied Sciences (Fachhochschule) ===
- Aeronautical Engineering (Bachelor of Engineering)
- Computer Engineering & Communication Technology (Bachelor of Engineering)
- Mechanical Engineering (Bachelor of Engineering)
- Computer Aided Engineering (Master of Engineering)
- Management and Media (Bachelor of Arts, Master of Arts)
- Defence Engineering (Bachelor of Engineering)
- Human Resources Management (Bachelor of Arts, Master of Arts)

=== Campus Advanced Studies Center, CASC ===
- International Management (Master of Business Administration, in cooperation with ESB Reutlingen)
- International Security Studies (Master of Arts, in cooperation with George C. Marshall European Center for Security Studies)
- Industrial Engineering (Bachelor of Engineering)
- Public Management (Master of Business Administration)
- Systems Engineering (Master of Science)
- Human Resources Development (Master of Arts)
- Public Information Systems (Bachelor of Science)

== Research ==
The university is well-established in different fields of research, especially when it comes to aeronautical engineering (e.g. participation in the GALILEO satellite program and development of different parts of space probes), computer-driven cars and information security. The University of the Bundeswehr Munich has the largest aviation and aerospace faculty in Germany. A main focus of the university are all kinds of security technology. The university is part of two excellence clusters of the German government universities excellence initiative (Cognition for Technical Systems and Munich-Centre for Advanced Photonics). The university hosts the ESA Summer School on Global Navigation Satellite Systems and the Munich Satellite Navigation Summit. The University of the Bundeswehr Munich forms part of the joint research and academic center Munich Aerospace, founded in 2010 and the Bavarian International Campus Aerospace & Security, founded in 2012. The university also has a number of partner companies which rely on the universities research expertise and support the university with products and facilities for testing and research. To strengthen its research profile and enhance cooperation between the faculties, the University of the Bundeswehr Munich has created several interdisciplinary research centers: SPACE, MOVE (Modern Vehicles), RISK (Risk, Infrastructure, Security and Conflict), MARC (Military Aviation Research Center), CODE (Cyber Defence). CODE is planned to have around 250 research personnel for Cyber Security. Germany's federal cyber security research agency Central Office for Information Technology in the Security Sector is to be moved with 400 employees to the Neubiberg campus of the University of the Bundeswehr Munich until 2023. With both organizations on campus the federal government aims to build up a cluster for cyber defence and security unique of its kind within Germany. In 2017 new Center for Intelligence and Security Studies (CISS) was created by the University of the Bundeswehr Munich in cooperation with the Federal University for Public Administration, Federal Intelligence Service (BND) and Federal Office for the Protection of the Constitution (BfV). Besides training future senior intelligence personnel the center is engaged in intelligence and security research.

== International collaboration ==
The University of the Bundeswehr Munich has partner universities worldwide. The following list shows some examples:

- Austria: University of Graz
- Canada: Queen's University
- Chile: Universidad de Chile (Santiago de Chile)
- China: Tongji University (Shanghai)
- Denmark: Aarhus University (Aarhus)
- Finland: University of Oulu (Oulu)
- France: Toulouse Business School (Toulouse), ENSAM (Paris), ENSTA Bretagne (Brest), ENSMP (Paris), ISEP (Paris)
- Hungary: Central European University (Budapest)
- Japan: Osaka Institute of Technology (Osaka)
- Netherlands: Technische Universiteit Delft (Delft)
- Poland: Wrocław University of Technology (Wrocław)
- Romania: Politehnica University of Bucharest (Bucharest), University of Craiova (Craiova)
- Scotland: Napier University
- Spain: Universidad Autónoma de Madrid (Madrid), Universitat Pompeu Fabra (Barcelona), Universidad de Cádiz (Cádiz)
- USA: University of Arizona (Tucson), University of Texas at El Paso, United States Military Academy, Naval Postgraduate School, Norwich University
- Vietnam: Le Quy Don Technical University

== Notable alumni ==
- Raheel Sharif, Chief of Army Staff of Pakistan and a 4-star General.
- Thomas Reiter, Director Human Spaceflight at the European Space Agency and former astronaut (former student)
- V. Ramgopal Rao, Director of IIT Delhi (former student)
- Thomas Daum, Vice Admiral and Inspector of the Cyber and Information Domain Service.
- Volker Wieker, former Chief of Staff of the German military (former student)
- Oliver D. Doleski, German economist, editor and author (former student)
- Wolfram Kühn, Former Deputy Chief of Staff of the German military (former student)
- Marion Schick, former chairman at Deutsche Telekom AG (former student)
- Klaus-Dietrich Flade, former astronaut (former student)
- Joachim Schmillen, former German Ambassador to Peru, Nigeria, Chile, Jamaica former Chief of the Planning Staff of the Foreign Ministry (former student)
- Roderich Kiesewetter, CDU politician and Member of the German Parliament (former student)
- Hans-Lothar Domröse, former Commander Allied Joint Force Command Brunssum (former student)
- Günther Schmitz, Vice President German Patent and Trade Mark Office

== Notable faculty ==
- Friedrich L. Sell, chief of the scientific advisory council of Halle Institute for Economic Research (former professor)
- Michael Wolffsohn, Israeli-born German historian (former professor)
- Brun-Otto Bryde, former judge at the German Constitutional Court (former professor)
- Ernst Dickmanns, pioneer of dynamic computervision and driverless cars (professor emeritus)
- Carlo Masala, professor for international politics (current professor)
- Gunther Schmidt, emeritus professor for computer science

== See also ==
- Helmut Schmidt University
- University of the German Federal Armed Forces
