= Claudia Major =

German political scientist (born 1976)

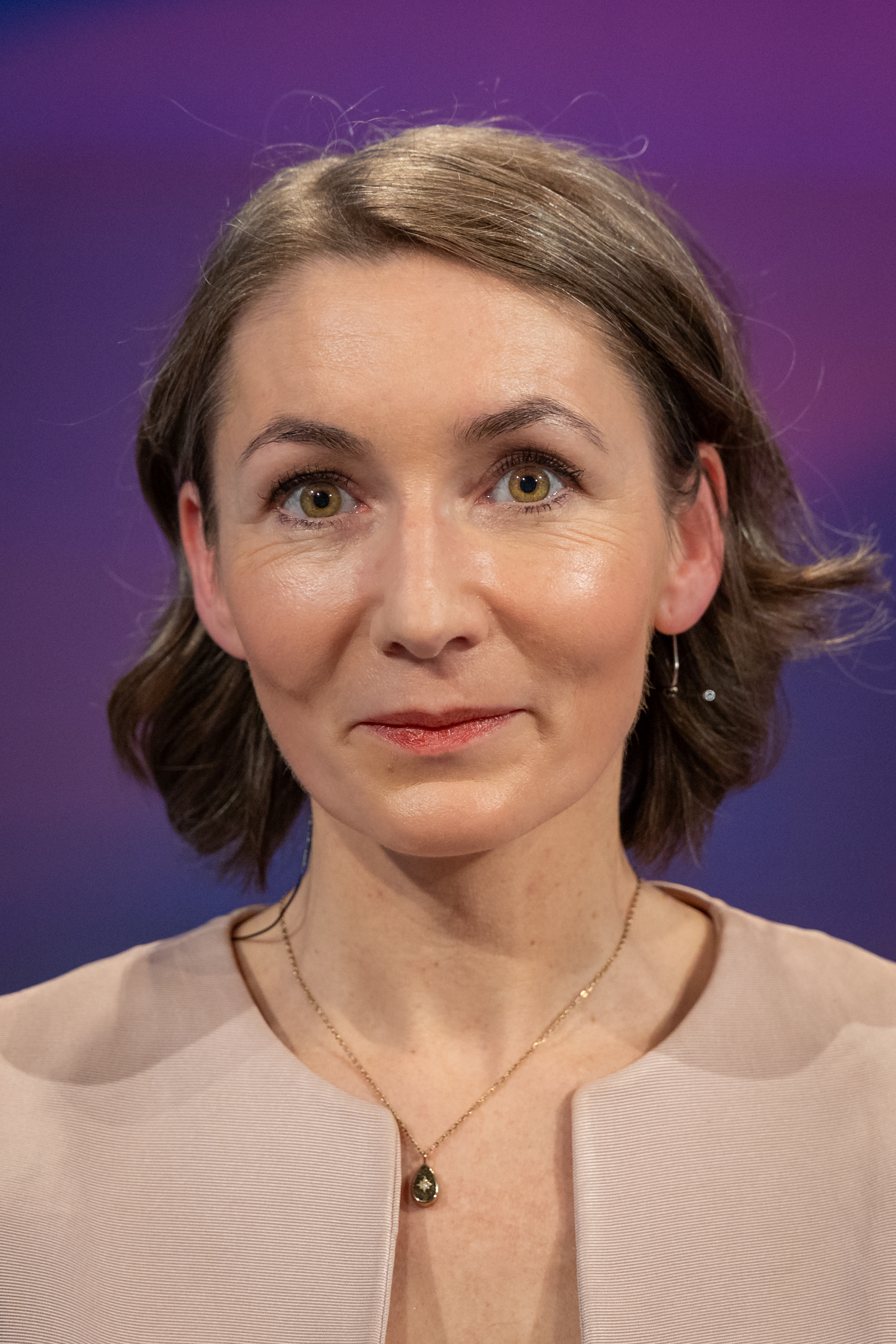
Claudia Major (2024)

Claudia Major (born August 15, 1976 in East Berlin) is a German political scientist and leader of a research group for security policy at the German Institute for International and Security Affairs.

== Career ==
Claudia Major completed her Abitur at the Hans-und-Hilde-Coppi-Gymnasium in Berlin-Karlshorst in 1996. From 1996 to 2000, she studied political science at the Free University of Berlin and at the Institut d’études politiques de Paris, graduating with a German-French double degree in political and social sciences.

From 2000 to 2001, she worked at the German Council on Foreign Relations, and from 2001 to 2003 at Network International Public Affairs (IPA) in Berlin. Between 2005 and 2007, she was a fellow of the international research program European Foreign and Security Policy Studies. Since 2006, she has held a teaching position at the Institut d’études politiques de Paris. In 2007, she conducted research at the European Union Institute for Security Studies in Paris, followed by a research position at the Center for Security Studies at ETH Zurich from 2008 to 2009.

Major completed her doctorate in 2009 with a thesis on "The development of the EU into a security and defence actor through ESDP" at the University of Birmingham.

Since 2010, she has been a member of the Advisory Board on Civilian Crisis Prevention and Peacebuilding of the German Federal Government. From 2020 to 2025, she led the Security Policy Research Division at the German Institute for International and Security Affairs (SWP) in Berlin. In March 2025, she was appointed Senior Vice President for Transatlantic Security Initiatives at the German Marshall Fund.

Her research focuses on European security and defense policy, including NATO, transatlantic relations, the EU, Germany, France, and the United Kingdom. Her recent work addresses topics such as NATO’s role, German defense policy, European strategic autonomy and sovereignty, as well as Franco-German cooperation.

== Honors ==
Major has received the French Ordre national du Mérite (Chevalier de l’Ordre national du Mérite).

== Personal life ==
Major is married and has three children.
