= Sell Hall =

American baseball player (1888–1951)

- Pitcher / Manager / Owner
- Born: June 15, 1888; Pittsburgh, Pennsylvania, U.S.
- Died: February 13, 1951 (aged 62); New York, New York, U.S.
- Batted: Unknown Threw: Right

Negro leagues debut
- 1917, Chicago American Giants

Last appearance
- 1921, Homestead Grays

Teams
- As player: Chicago American Giants (1917); Homestead Grays (1918, 1921)

Sellers McKee Hall (June 15, 1888 – February 13, 1951) was the first African-American music promoter to be based in Pittsburgh, Pennsylvania, as well as professional player and executive in Negro league baseball.

== Music promoter ==
During the 1920s and 1930s, as the manager of the city's Pythian Temple, he brought the biggest names in jazz to the city for his popular dances that drew crowds of 1,500 to 2,000. Several of the acts that Hall booked include Duke Ellington, Count Basie, Fletcher Henderson, Billy Eckstine, Cab Calloway and Don Redman. Hall was also a rival of Gus Greenlee, the owner of the Crawford Grill and the Pittsburgh Crawfords, and Cumberland Posey, the owner of the Homestead Grays. During the off-season from baseball Hall worked as a nightclub manager and dance promoter. He also worked as a writer for the Pittsburgh Courier in 1912.

== Professional sports ==
Hall became a multi-sport athletic star excelling in track, football, basketball, and baseball playing for Pittsburgh's Central High School. Upon graduation, he took a job at the United States Postal Service, however he continued his athletic career playing for sandlot and semi-pro teams in baseball, football, and basketball. He also competed in independent track meets as a short distance runner and a jumper. Sell became a star pitcher with the independent club team Pittsburgh Colored Collegians in 1913, with his brother, Howard 'Ram" Hall, serving as his catcher. The Collegians were the then-chief rivals of Homestead Grays. He joined the Daddy Clay's Giants in April 1917, and was then signed by Cumberland Posey to play for the Grays in 1917 and 1918. Sell left the Grays at the end of the 1918 season, when he was recruited by Rube Foster to pitch for the Chicago American Giants. However, he returned to pitch for the Grays in 1938 for an old-timers game celebrating the Grays 25th anniversary.

In 1920 Sell's Pittsburgh American Giants, also known as the "Green Socks", played in the newly built Central Park, the first African American owned baseball park in Pittsburgh's history. In 1924 Sell purchased the field. Sell continued to pitch with the Giants until 1925 throwing a four hitter in Warren Ohio. In 1922 Sell fielded a team called the Cuban X-Giants, which had several played speaking fake Spanish and pretending to be Cubans. In 1925 Sell sold the Central Park and it became a summer dancing pavilion.

== Personal life ==
Sellers and his wife Marguerite, gave birth to 12 children. Their eldest, Doris, later became the first black female manager with the Pittsburgh Housing Authority, after being turned down to be an English teacher in the Pittsburgh Public Schools in the late 1930s based upon her race. She celebrated her 100th birthday on June 1, 2014. Hall divorced his wife and moved to Chicago in 1939. In 1941 he became a deputy sheriff in Chicago, however he still continued to book dances.

In August 1946 Hall was arrested in Chicago and brought back to Pittsburgh, charged with failure to pay child support. Owing over $3,000 in unpaid child support he pleaded guilty. At the time, Hall was unemployed and was waiting money to funnel in from a bottle cap invention of his, as well as royalties from seven songs that he had written and published. He died on February 13, 1951, after a long illness, at the age of 62.
