= Friedrich L. Sell =

German economist

Friedrich Leopold Sell (born 26 May 1954) is a professor of Economics at the University of the Bundeswehr Munich as well as chief of the scientific council of Halle Institute for Economic Research. Furthermore, he is vice chief of studies at the Academy for Business and Administration in Munich.

== Life ==
Sell studied from 1974 to 1979 Economics at the University of Freiburg and started to work there as a scientist 1979. He received his doctorate in 1981 and his Habilitation in 1988. After temporarily working as a visiting professor for economics and research on development countries, Sell was full professor of economics at the University of Giessen from 1991 to 1992.

In 1992, he switched to the Dresden University of Technology, where he was offered a chair of economics, especially international economic relations. Since 1998 Sell is full professor of economics, especially macroeconomics and economic policy, at the University of the Bundeswehr Munich. From 2008 to 2010, he was the university's vice president, responsible for research. Since 2010, he is chief of the scientific council of Halle Institute for Economic Research where he already had a position before.

Sell focuses his research on international economic relations and theoretical as well as political questions of the macroeconomic theory.

== Publications ==
- Sell, Friedrich (2001). Contagion in Financial Markets. Edgar Elgar: Northhamton.
- Aktuelle Probleme der europäischen Wirtschaftspolitik (UTB Taschenbuch; 2307). 2nd ed.. Lucius & Lucius Verlag, Stuttgart 2007, ISBN 978-3-8282-0379-2
- Aufgaben und Lösungen in der Volkswirtschaftslehre. Springer, Berlin 2007, ISBN 978-3-540-85042-7
- Einführung in die Volkswirtschaftslehre. 4th ed. Springer, Berlin 2007, ISBN 978-3-540-74215-9 (in collaboration with Paul Engelkamp)
- Globalisierung und nationale Entwicklungspolitik. Lit-Verlag, Münster 2003, ISBN 3-8258-6724-2 (in collaboration with Uwe Mummert)
- Emotionen, Markt und Moral (Kulturelle Ökonomik; Vol. 7). Lit-Verlag, Münster 2005, ISBN 3-8258-8827-4 (in collaboration with Uwe Mummert)

== Literature ==
- Dorit Petschel (Bearb.): Die Professoren der TU Dresden 1828–2003. Böhlau Verlag, Köln / Weimar / Vienna 2003, S. 906.
