= Helmuth and Annemarie Sell =

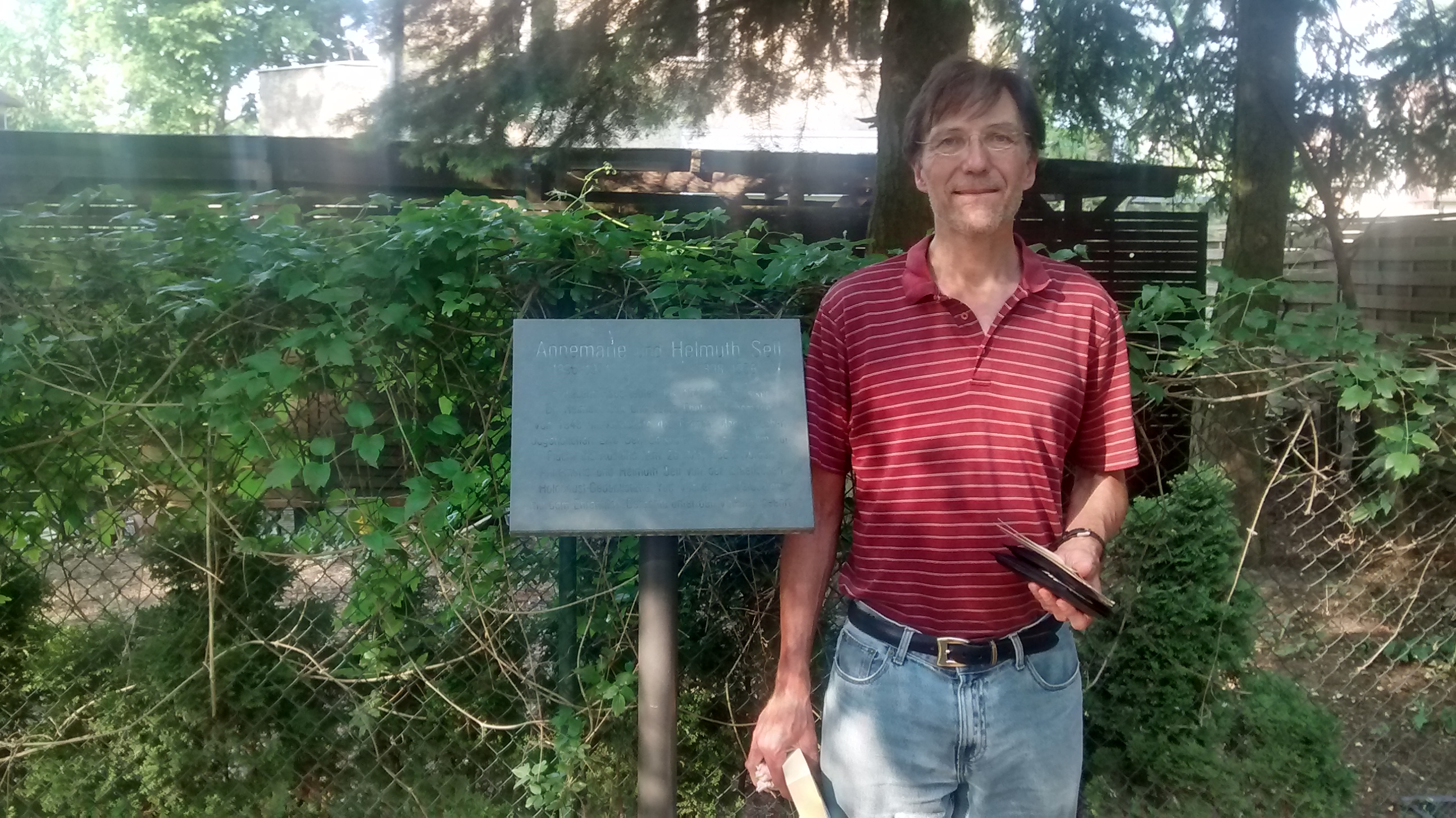
Dr. Christian Sell, grandson of Helmuth and Annemarie Sell standing at the plaque dedicated to his grandparents in front of their home at Karl-Marx Strasse 11 in Potsdam Germany.

Dr. Helmut Sell (1898–1956) and his wife Annemarie (1896–1972) were German Holocaust rescuers living in Berlin during the Third Reich. In 1981, they were posthumously honored as "Righteous among the Nations" by Yad Vashem at a ceremony in Jerusalem. In October 2002, the medal was finally presented to the children of the Sells at a ceremony in Schenectady, New York.

In 1933, Dr. Sell resigned as his position at Siemens AG in order to avoid joining the Nazi Party. At that time, Siemens required all department heads to be party members. He then opened a small factory for fine mechanical parts at the Englische Strasse in Berlin-Dahlem.

In March of 1943, he hired as a delivery boy a Jewish youth named Ezra Feinberg who had been living illegally on the streers of Berlin under the name Wilhelm Schneider since May 1942 when his parents were deported. The elder Feinbergs would not survive the camps. Dr. Sell did not realize that Schneider, who showed up dressed in a Hitler Youth uniform, was actually an illegal Jew. When, three weeks later Ezra confided his true identity, Sell responded by identifying himself as an old-time Social Democrat and a sworn enemy of the Nazi regime.

Sell arranged forged travel documents for the boy, which purported to prove that he was going to Budapest at the behest of the German armaments industry. On the last nights before the journey, he sheltered young Ezra in his own home in Potsdam, and provided him with food and counsel. Dr. Sell's wife Annemarie was also party to the secret.

On May 28, 1981, Yad Vashem recognized Dr. Helmuth and Annemarie Sell as Righteous Among the Nations.
