= Adlkofen =

- Municipality
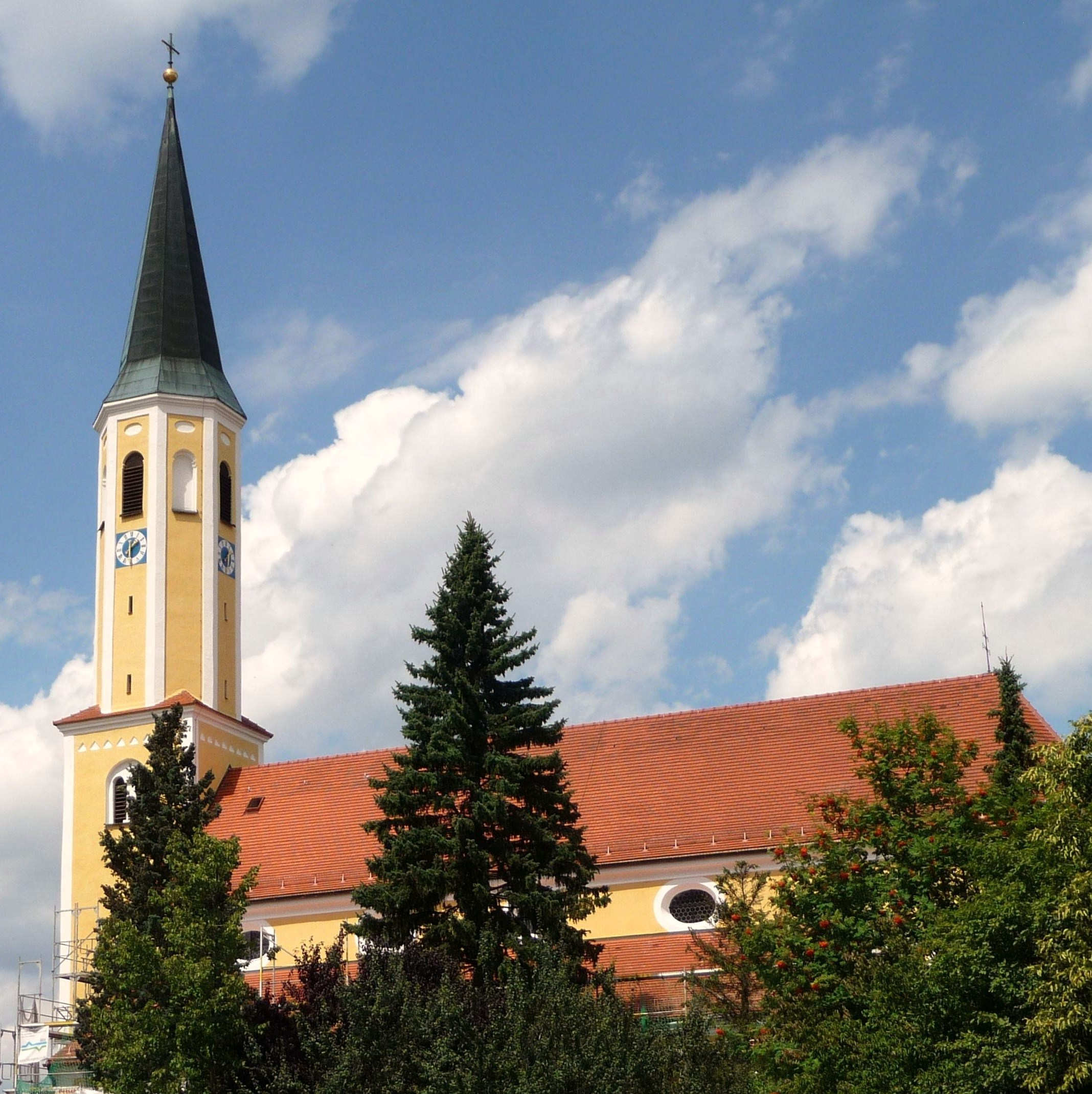
- Church of Saint Thomas in Adlkofen

- Coat of arms

- Location of Adlkofen within Landshut district
- Interactive map of Adlkofen
- Location within Germany Location within Bavaria
- Coordinates: 48°33′N 12°16′E
- Country: Germany
- State: Bavaria
- Admin. region: Niederbayern
- District: Landshut

Government
  - Mayor (2020–26): Rosa-Maria Maurer

Area
  - Total: 47.82 km^{2} (18.46 sq mi)
- Elevation: 499 m (1,637 ft)

Population (2025-12-31)
  - Total: 4,549
  - Density: 95.13/km^{2} (246.4/sq mi)
- Time zone: UTC+01:00 (CET)
  - Summer (DST): UTC+02:00 (CEST)
- Postal codes: 84166
- Dialling codes: 08707
- Vehicle registration: LA
- Website: www.adlkofen.de

Adlkofen is a municipality in the South Bavarian district of Landshut.

== Geography ==
=== Geographical location ===
Adlkofen lies only 8 km east of Landshut and south of the valley of the Isar.

=== Neighbouring local authorities ===
- Kumhausen
- Geisenhausen
- Kröning
- Niederaichbach

=== Administrative divisions ===
The political authority of Adlkofen has 95 officially labelled districts.:

- Adlkofen
- Aign
- Armannsberg
- Ay
- Baumgarten
- Berg
- Beutelhausen
- Birnkofen
- Bleiwimm
- Blumberg
- Brunn
- Buchschachten
- Dechantsreit
- Deutenkofen
- Eglberg
- Engkofen
- Etzhäusel
- Faltern
- Feichten
- Forst (Adlkofen)
- Forstenrode
- Garsberg
- Gersteneck
- Girglhaid
- Göttlkofen
- Gräben
- Großbirken
- Grünn
- Günzkofen
- Hagenau
- Harskirchen
- Hauslehen
- Hettenkofen
- Hillau
- Hofstetten
- Höll
- Holzen
- Jenkofen
- Kalteneck
- Kampfrain
- Kirmbach
- Kleinbirken
- Kleinegglkofen
- Kleinreit
- Kobel
- Läuterkofen
- Leiersöd
- Lernpoint
- Lochham
- Martlhaid
- Mühlmann
- Nöham
- Oberkühbuch
- Obermusbach
- Oberpettenbach
- Öd
- Pattendorf
- Patzing
- Pöffelkofen
- Point
- Pointen
- Rammelsberg
- Ratzenstall
- Reichersöd
- Reichlkofen
- Renau
- Reuth bei Jenkofen
- Ried
- Riedenberg
- Riedenwies
- Roßberg
- Santing
- Schindlbach
- Schußrain
- Schwatzkofen
- Semmelberg
- Setzensack
- Sittlerhof
- Sittlkofen
- Stempen
- Stöckl am Eck
- Thann
- Unterkühbuch
- Untermusbach
- Vorderwaid
- Weiher
- Weizeneck
- Wies
- Willerberg
- Willerskirchen
- Wippenbach
- Wölflkofen
- Wolfseck
- Wollkofen
- Zaitzkofen

== History ==
The name Adlkofen was mentioned for the first time as the county of Adalahkevva in a document issued by the Kaiser Otto I shortly before his death in 973 in Merseburg. He gave with it his personal property in Beutelhausen, which lay in the county of Adlkofen, to Niedermünster Abbey in Regensburg. The settlement name of Aetelkouen was also mentioned for the first time in a document from 1252. Since 1762 the written name “Adlkofen” has been used. The name is determined from the personal name of Adelo (or Adalhoh), with which the suffix -hofen (Ansiedlung, Hof (courtyard)) was combined. In Adlkofen secular rule was present very early on. In 1687 Wolfstein was handed over to Adlkofen, where it remained under the management of a local magistrate of the district court of Teisbach until 1803. The magistrate performed judicial functions over all people who were not subjects of Hofsmarkherren. He oversaw four administrations, named Reichersdorf, Frauenberg, Günzkofen und Hohenegglkofen. From these old administrative units in 1812, new political municipalities were created. Hofmarks exist to this day in Deutenkofen, Göttlkofen und Günzkofen. Only in the 17th century was a 3-storey castle built in Deutenkofen. However, a noble family never lived there permanently. Societal relations were decisively moulded by the pastor.(?)

== Buildings ==
=== Churches ===
The municipality of Adlkofen is divided in three parishes: Adlkofen, Reichlkofen and Jenkofen. The church of Adlkofen was built in 1733 in its present form. The church of Reichlkofen was built in 1876 and the church of Jenkofen was built in 1422. There are also churches in some of the smaller villages like in Günzkofen or Deutenkofen.

=== School and kindergarten ===
Adlkofen belongs to the oldest school places in the district of Landshut. Even in 1635 there used to live family of teachers in the municipality. The school building was renovated in 1991 and expanded from eight to ten classes. Since the school year 2005/2006 there are only taught four grades.

The first Kindergarten existed between 1939 and 1944 for the children of the farmers during harvest season. On the initiative of some parents in 1973 there was established a pre-school Kindergarten in the school building. In 1977 a Kindergarten building was built at its present place and was expanded in 1993

== Twin town ==
- Badia Calavena, Italy

== Literature ==
- Schröder, Ernst J. & Wagensonner, Hans (1987), Adlkofen - Bilder und Dokumente aus alter Zeit, Horb am Neckar: Geiger-Verlag, ISBN 3-89264-133-1
- Schröder Ernst, Ernst J. (1998), Adlkofen - Bilder und Texte aus der Gemeinde, Horb am Neckar: Geiger-Verlag, ISBN 3-89570-403-2
- Schröder, Ernst J. (2006), Adlkofen - Die 50er und 60er Jahre, Horb am Neckar: Geiger-Verlag, ISBN 978-3-86595-165-6
