= Bruckberg =

There are two municipalities called Bruckberg in Bavaria, Germany:

- Bruckberg, Lower Bavaria, a municipality in the district of Landshut
- Bruckberg, Middle Franconia, a municipality in the district of Ansbach

Bruckberg is also the name of one of the townships of the city Zell am See in Lower Austria, Austria.
