= Allmannsberg (Geisenhausen) =

Coordinates: 48°30′21″N 12°17′58″E

- Hamlet
- Interactive map of Allmannsberg
- Country: Germany
- Bundesland: Bavaria
- Regierungsbezirk: Lower Bavaria
- Landkreis: Landshut

Population
  - Total: 13

Allmannsberg is a small hamlet in the municipality of Geisenhausen, Lower Bavaria, Landshut district.

== Geography ==
The hamlet lies about 4 kilometers northeast of the center of Geisenhausen on the connecting road between Wolfsteig and Helmsau.

=== Transport ===
Bus route 548 runs along the village of Allmannsberg, but there isn't a stop.

== Census ==
At the 1987 Bavarian State Office of Statistics and Data Processing census, recorded in the Gemeindeteiledatei, the hamlet had 13 inhabitants. Earlier records from the Amtliches Ortsverzeichnis für Bayern show that the population was 19 in 1970, 31 in 1950, and 29 in 1925. Going further back to 1871, the Amtliches Ortsverzeichnis für Bayern recorded 11 inhabitants in the hamlet.
