= Schwatzkofen =

- Village of Adlkofen
- Interactive map of Schwatzkofen
- Location within Germany Location within Bavaria
- Coordinates: 48°31′N 12°17′E
- Country: Germany
- State: Bavaria
- Admin. region: Lower Bavaria
- District: Landshut
- Municipality: Adlkofen
- Time zone: UTC+01:00 (CET)
  - Summer (DST): UTC+02:00 (CEST)
- Postal codes: 84166
- Vehicle registration: LA

Schwatzkofen is a village within the municipality of Adlkofen in the district of Landshut, in Bavaria, Germany. It is situated 8 km east of Landshut.
