= Rieder (surname) =

Rieder is a German-language surname. People with the surname include:

- Anna-Maria Rieder (born 2000), German para alpine skier
- Fabian Rieder (born 2002), Swiss footballer
- Hermann Rieder (1928–2009), German javelin thrower, trainer and sports scientist
- Josef Rieder (1893–1916), German cyclist
- Tim Rieder (born 1993), German footballer
