= Athletics at the 1955 Summer International University Sports Week – Men's javelin throw =

The men's javelin throw event at the 1955 International University Sports Week was held in San Sebastián on 14 August 1955.

== Medalists ==
Gold	Silver	Bronze
Hermann Rieder; West Germany	Peter Cullen; Great Britain	Gian Luigi Farina; Italy

== Results ==
=== Qualification ===
Rank	Athlete	Nationality	Result	Notes
1	Peter Cullen	Great Britain	64.15	Q, GR
2	Hermann Rieder	West Germany	62.57	Q
3	Gian Luigi Farina	Italy	57.64	Q
4	Shinsuke Tanada	Japan	57.07	Q
5	Atef Ismaïl	Egypt	55.54	Q
6	Gert Thues	Belgium	54.22	Q
7	Giovanni Lievore	Italy	54.01	
8	Claudio Riccardi	Italy	53.59	
9	Fritz Böhler	Saar	52.44	
10	Hans-Georg von Schnering	West Germany	50.20	
11	Silvério Tomás	Portugal	43.42	

=== Final ===
Rank	Name	Nationality	Result	Notes
1st place, gold medalist(s)	Hermann Rieder	West Germany	69.90	GR
2nd place, silver medalist(s)	Peter Cullen	Great Britain	64.15	
3rd place, bronze medalist(s)	Gian Luigi Farina	Italy	62.12	
4	Atef Ismaïl	Egypt	57.39	
5	Shinsuke Tanada	Japan	57.07	
6	Gert Thues	Belgium	55.55	
