= Johann Philipp Gabler =

German theologian (1753–1826)

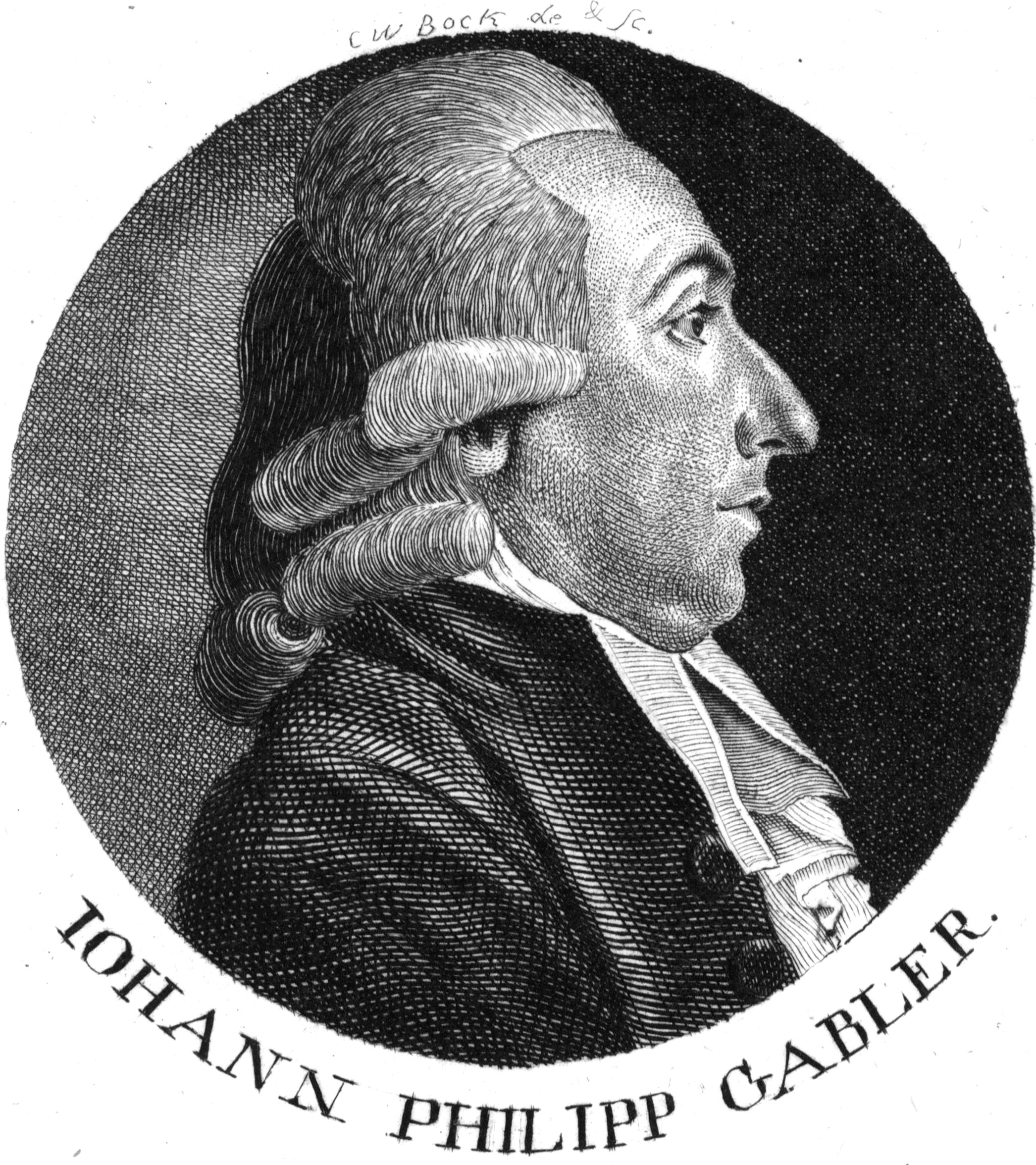
- Born: 4 June 1753; Frankfurt
- Died: 17 February 1826 (aged 72); Altdorf
- Occupations: Professor; Theologian
- Years active: XVIII–XIX
- Notable work: On the Correct Distinction Between Dogmatic and Biblical Theology and the Right Definition of Their Goals
- Theological work
- Era: 18th Century
- Language: German
- Tradition or movement: Protestant
- Main interests: Biblical theology

Johann Philipp Gabler (4 June 1753 – 17 February 1826) was a German Protestant Christian theologian of the school of Johann Jakob Griesbach and Johann Gottfried Eichhorn.

Gabler was born at Frankfurt-am-Main. In 1772 he entered the University of Jena as a theological student. In 1776 he was on the point of abandoning theology when the arrival of Griesbach inspired within him a new enthusiasm for the subject. After having been successively Repetent in the University of Göttingen and teacher in the public schools of Dortmund (Westphalia) and Altdorf (Bavaria), he was appointed second professor of theology at the University of Altdorf in 1785, then promoted to a chair in Jena in 1804, where he succeeded Griesbach in 1812 and remained until his death.

At Altdorf, Gabler published (1791–93) a new edition, with introduction and notes, of Eichhorn's Urgeschichte. This was followed, two years later, by a supplement entitled Neuer Versuch uber die mosaische Schopfungsgeschichte. He also wrote many essays characterized by critical acumen, and which had considerable influence on the course of German thought in various issues within theology and Biblical studies.

From 1798 to 1800 he was editor of the Neuestes theologisches Journal, first jointly with H.K.A. Hänlein (1762–1829), Christoph Friedrich von Ammon and Heinrich Eberhard Gottlob Paulus, and afterwards as sole editor; from 1801 to 1804 of the Journal für theologische Litteratur; and from 1805 to 1811 of the Journal für auserlesene theologische Litteratur. Some of his essays were published by his sons (2 volumes, 1831); and a memoir appeared in 1827 by W. Schröter.

Gabler is widely considered to be the father of modern biblical theology because of his 1787 inaugural address at University of Altdorf: On the Correct Distinction Between Dogmatic and Biblical Theology and the Right Definition of Their Goals. Gabler sharply distinguished between biblical and dogmatic theology. For him, biblical theology was simply historical investigation into the beliefs of the biblical authors as they stand in the text. It is purely descriptive and uninfluenced by the viewpoints of modern thinkers. On the other hand, dogmatic theology is a systematized construction, built on the foundation of biblical theology and contextualized — applied to the context or era in which it is to be proclaimed.
