= Tiefenbach =

Tiefenbach may refer to:

== Places ==
=== Austria ===
- Tiefenbach bei Kaindorf, a former municipality in the district of Hartberg-Fürstenfeld in Styria, today part of Hartl
- Tiefenbach, a township of the municipality of Judenburg in Styria

=== Czech Republic ===
- Tiefenbach, a historical exonym for Hloubětín

=== Germany ===
- Tiefenbach, Biberach, a municipality in Baden-Württemberg, in the district of Biberach
- Tiefenbach, Landshut, a municipality in Bavaria, in the district of Landshut
- Tiefenbach, Passau, a municipality in Bavaria, in the district of Passau
- Tiefenbach, Rhineland-Palatinate, a municipality in the district of Rhein-Hunsrück
- Tiefenbach, Saxony, a municipality in the district of Mittweida
- Tiefenbach, Upper Palatinate, a municipality in Bavaria, in the district of Cham
- Tiefenbach (Jagst), a river of Baden-Württemberg, tributary of the Jagst
- Tiefenbach (Rems), a river of Baden-Württemberg, tributary of the Rems
- Tiefenbach (Wisper), a river of Rhineland-Palatinate and Hesse, tributary of the Wisper
- Tiefenbach (Oberstdorf), a quarter of Oberstdorf in Bavaria
- Tiefenbach, a quarter of Crailsheim in Baden-Württemberg
- Tiefenbach, a quarter of Illertissen in Bavaria

=== Poland ===
- Książ Wielkopolski, Śrem County, Poland; known as Tiefenbach from 1943 to 1945

=== Switzerland ===
- Tiefenbach, a former German name of Belprahon

== Other uses ==
- Tiefenbach DFB railway station, a station in Switzerland

== People with the surname ==
- Dov Tiefenbach (born 1981), Canadian actor and musician
- Peter Tiefenbach, Canadian classical music composer and radio host, nominee in the Juno Awards of 1994
- Rudolf von Tiefenbach (1582–1653), Habsburg military leader

== See also ==
- Oberweiler-Tiefenbach, an Ortsgemeinde in the Kusel district in Rhineland-Palatinate, Germany
