= Furth (Verwaltungsgemeinschaft) =

- Verwaltungsgemeinschaft
- Location of Furth within Landshut district
- Interactive map of Furth
- Location within Germany Location within Bavaria
- Coordinates: 48°35′N 12°01′E
- Country: Germany
- State: Bavaria
- Admin. region: Lower Bavaria
- District: Landshut
- Seat: Furth
- Subdivisions: 3 municipalities

Area
  - Total: 76.72 km^{2} (29.62 sq mi)

Population (2025-12-31)
  - Total: 7,779
  - Density: 101.4/km^{2} (262.6/sq mi)
- Time zone: UTC+01:00 (CET)
  - Summer (DST): UTC+02:00 (CEST)
- Website: www.vg-furth.de

Furth is a Verwaltungsgemeinschaft (municipal association) in the district of Landshut in Bavaria, Germany. Its seat is in Furth.

It consists of the following municipalities:

1. Furth
2. Obersüßbach
3. Weihmichl
