= Georg Kaspar Nagler =

German art historian and art writer

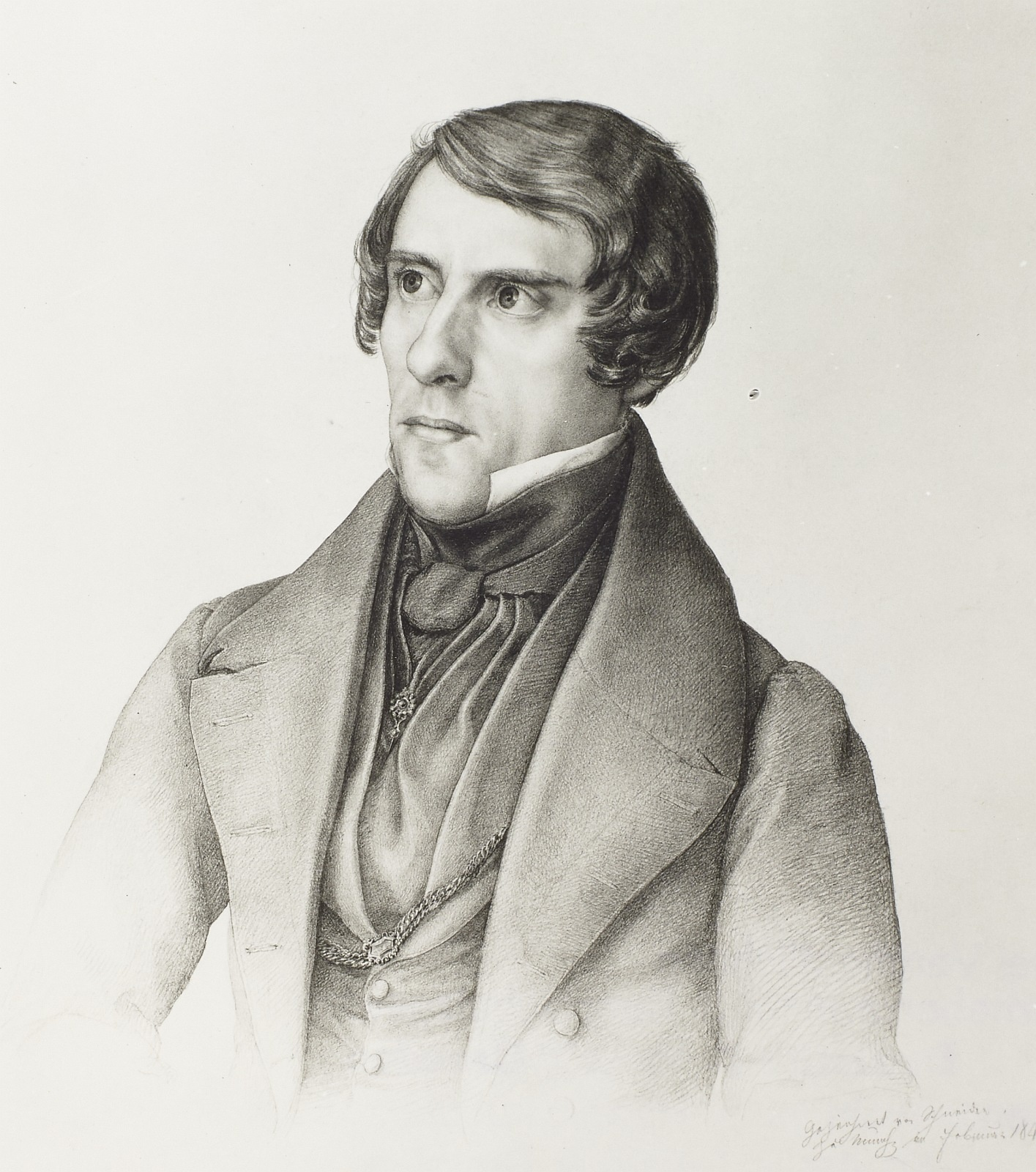
Georg Kaspar Nagler; portrait by Robert Schneider (1840)

Georg Kaspar Nagler (January 6, 1801 in Obersüßbach – January 20, 1866 in Munich) was a German art historian and art writer.

== Life and work ==
Georg Kaspar Nagler, who came from a poor background studied from 1815 at the Wilhelmsgymnasium, Munich (today). From 1823 he studied philology and natural sciences at the local lyceum, finally receiving a doctorate to become Dr. phil in 1829, at the University of Erlangen. Already since 1827 he was owner of a second-hand bookshop, after he married the bookshop owner's widow Johanna Ehrentreich. He became an employee of the Bayerische National-Zeitung, published by Joseph Heinrich Wolf.

His New General Artist Lexicon, appeared in 1835–1852 in 22 volumes. For this he received gold medals for art and science from Duke Max in Bayern and Friedrich Wilhelm IV of Prussia. It was largely based on the General Artist Lexicon by Rudolf Füssli (1709–1793). From 1836 he lectured on the history of architecture at the Royal School of Construction.

== Publications (selection) ==
- De Rhapsodis.Thesis, 1829.
- Eight days in Munich. Franz, Munich 1834 (reprint of the edition of 1863: Gerber, Munich 1983, ISBN 3-87249-067-2).
- History of the porcelain manufactory to Munich. Munich 1834 (also in: Bavarian Annals, Abth. Vaterlandskunde, 1834, No. 34-38, Georg Kaspar Nagler at Google Books).
- New general artist lexicon or news from the life and works of painters, sculptors, master builders, engravers, trimmers, lithographers, draftsmen, medalists, ivory workers, etc. 22 volumes. Publisher of E. A. Fleischmann, Munich 1835–1852 (total 12,500 pages).
- Rafael as a human being and artist. Publisher of E. A. Fleischmann, Munich 1836.
- Michel-Angelo Buonarotti as an artist. Publisher of E. A. Fleischmann, Munich 1836.
- Albrecht Dürer and his art. Publisher of E. A. Fleischmann, Munich 1837.
- Life and works of Marco-Antonio Raimondi from Bologna. 1842.
- Life and Works of the Painter and Rader Rembrandt van Ryn. Munich 1843.
- Contributions to the older topography of Munich. 1847–1850; 2nd edition as topographical history of Munich and its suburbs. Franz, Munich 1863.
- The Monogrammists and those known and unknown artists of all schools who are called to designate their works of a figurative sign, the initials of the name, the Abbreviatur of the same & c. have served. 5 volumes plus general index. G. Franz, Munich 1858–1863, urn:urn:nbn:de:hbz:061:1-21224:{{{2}}} (Volúmenes 4 y 5 a título póstumo, 15,000 monogramas de 12,000 artistas).

== Literature ==
- Hyacinth Holland (1886). "Nagler, Georg Kaspar". Allgemeine Deutsche Biographie (in German). Vol. 23. Leipzig: Duncker & Humblot. pp. 228–233.
- Thomas Hilka (1997). "Nagler, Georg Kaspar". Neue Deutsche Biographie (in German). Vol. 18. Berlin: Duncker & Humblot. pp. 714–715. (full text online).
