= Vilsheim =

- Municipality
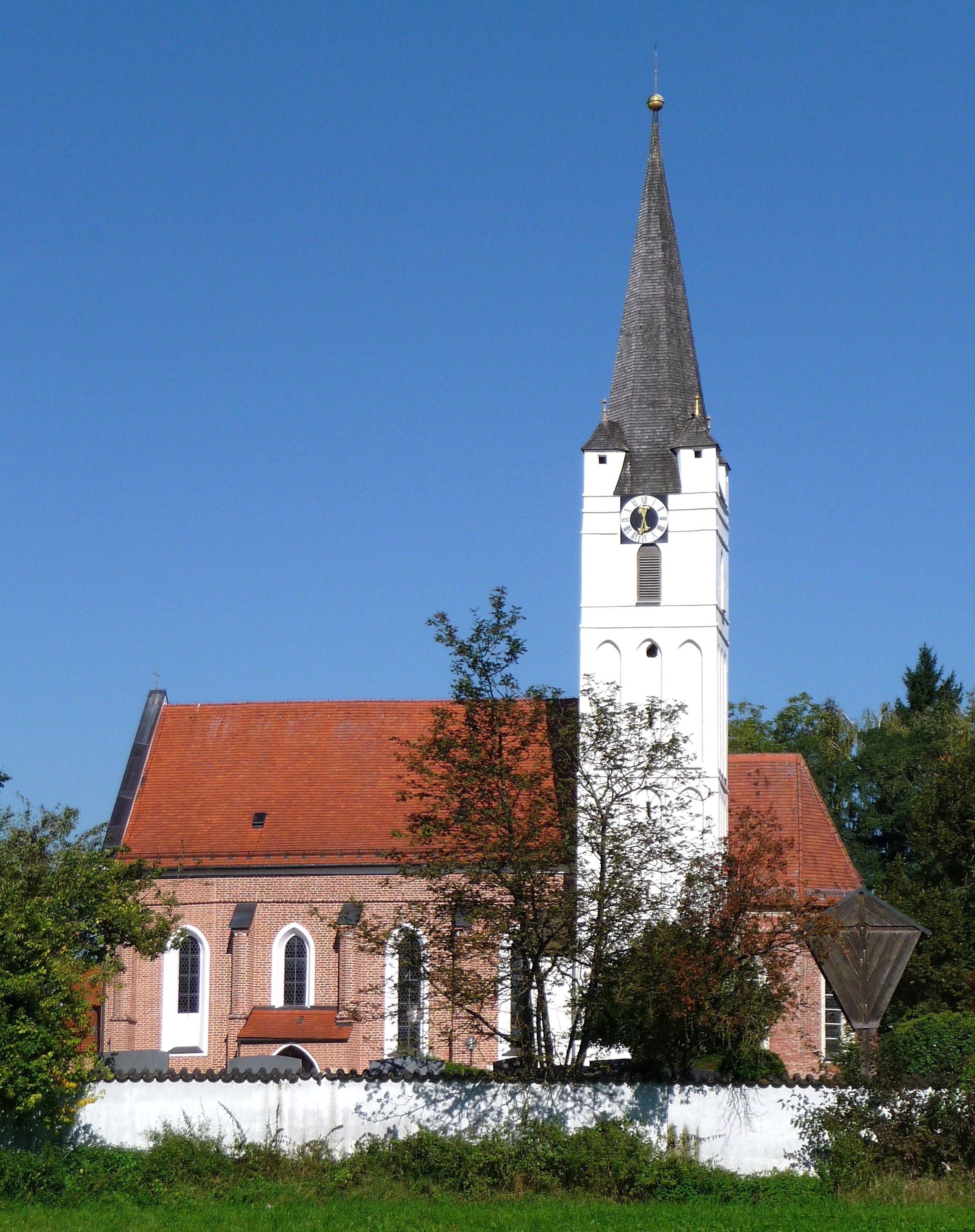
- Church of Saint Castulus

- Coat of arms

- Location of Vilsheim within Landshut district
- Interactive map of Vilsheim
- Location within Germany Location within Bavaria
- Coordinates: 48°27′N 12°7′E
- Country: Germany
- State: Bavaria
- Admin. region: Niederbayern
- District: Landshut
- Subdivisions: 3 Ortsteile

Government
  - Mayor (2020–26): Georg Spornraft-Penker

Area
  - Total: 21.70 km^{2} (8.38 sq mi)
- Elevation: 467 m (1,532 ft)

Population (2025-12-31)
  - Total: 2,696
  - Density: 124.2/km^{2} (321.8/sq mi)
- Time zone: UTC+01:00 (CET)
  - Summer (DST): UTC+02:00 (CEST)
- Postal codes: 84186
- Dialling codes: 08706
- Vehicle registration: LA
- Website: www.vilsheim.de

Vilsheim is a municipality in the district of Landshut in Bavaria in Germany.
