= Buch am Erlbach =

Buch a.Erlbach
- Municipality
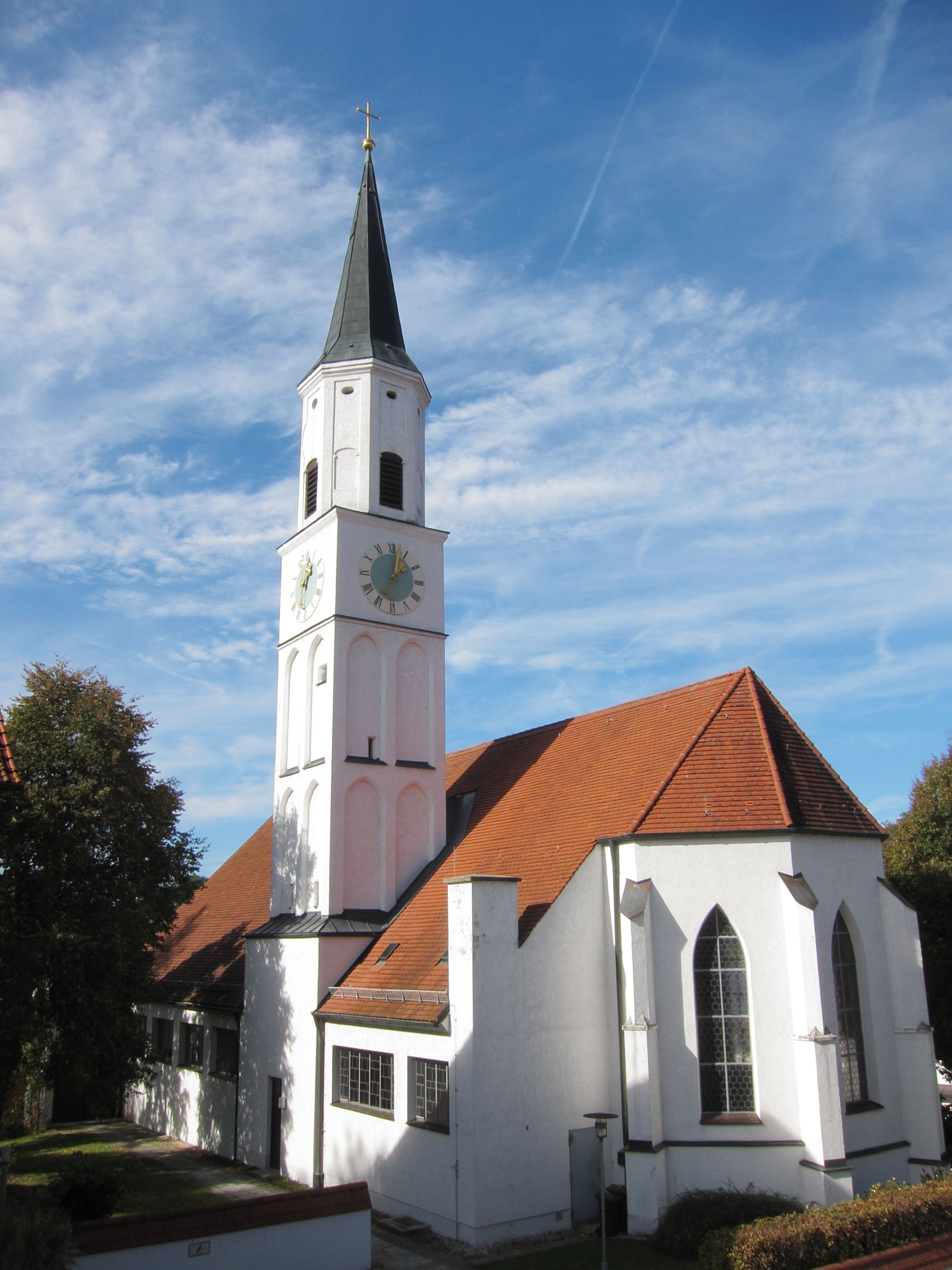
- Church of Saints Peter and Paul

- Coat of arms

- Location of Buch a.Erlbach within Landshut district
- Interactive map of Buch a.Erlbach
- Location within Germany Location within Bavaria
- Coordinates: 48°27′N 12°03′E
- Country: Germany
- State: Bavaria
- Admin. region: Niederbayern
- District: Landshut

Government
  - Mayor (2020–26): Elisabeth Winklmaier-Wenzl (CSU)

Area
  - Total: 26.71 km^{2} (10.31 sq mi)
- Elevation: 441 m (1,447 ft)

Population (2025-12-31)
  - Total: 3,911
  - Density: 146.4/km^{2} (379.2/sq mi)
- Time zone: UTC+01:00 (CET)
  - Summer (DST): UTC+02:00 (CEST)
- Postal codes: 84172
- Dialling codes: 08709
- Vehicle registration: LA
- Website: www.buch-am-erlbach.de

Buch is a municipality in the district of Landshut in Bavaria in Germany.

The name "Buch am Erlbach" means "beech at alder brook".
