= Badia Calavena =

- Comune
- Comune di Badia Calavena
- Coat of arms

- Location within Italy Location within Veneto
- Coordinates: 45°34′N 11°9′E
- Country: Italy
- Region: Veneto
- Province: Verona (VR)
- Frazioni: Sant'Andrea, Santissima Trinità, San Valentino, Sprea

Government
  - Mayor: Emanuele Anselmi

Area
  - Total: 26.94 km^{2} (10.40 sq mi)
- Elevation: 470 m (1,540 ft)

Population (31 December 2020)
  - Total: 2,580
  - Density: 95.8/km^{2} (248/sq mi)
- Demonym: Badioti
- Time zone: UTC+1 (CET)
  - Summer (DST): UTC+2 (CEST)
- Postal code: 37030
- Dialing code: 045
- Website: Official website

Badia Calavena (Cimbrian: kam' Àbato; German: Kalwein) is a comune (municipality) in the Province of Verona in the Veneto region, located about 90 kilometres (56 mi) west of Venice and about 20 kilometres (12 mi) northeast of Verona. It is part of the Thirteen Communities, a group of villages which historically speak the Cimbrian language.

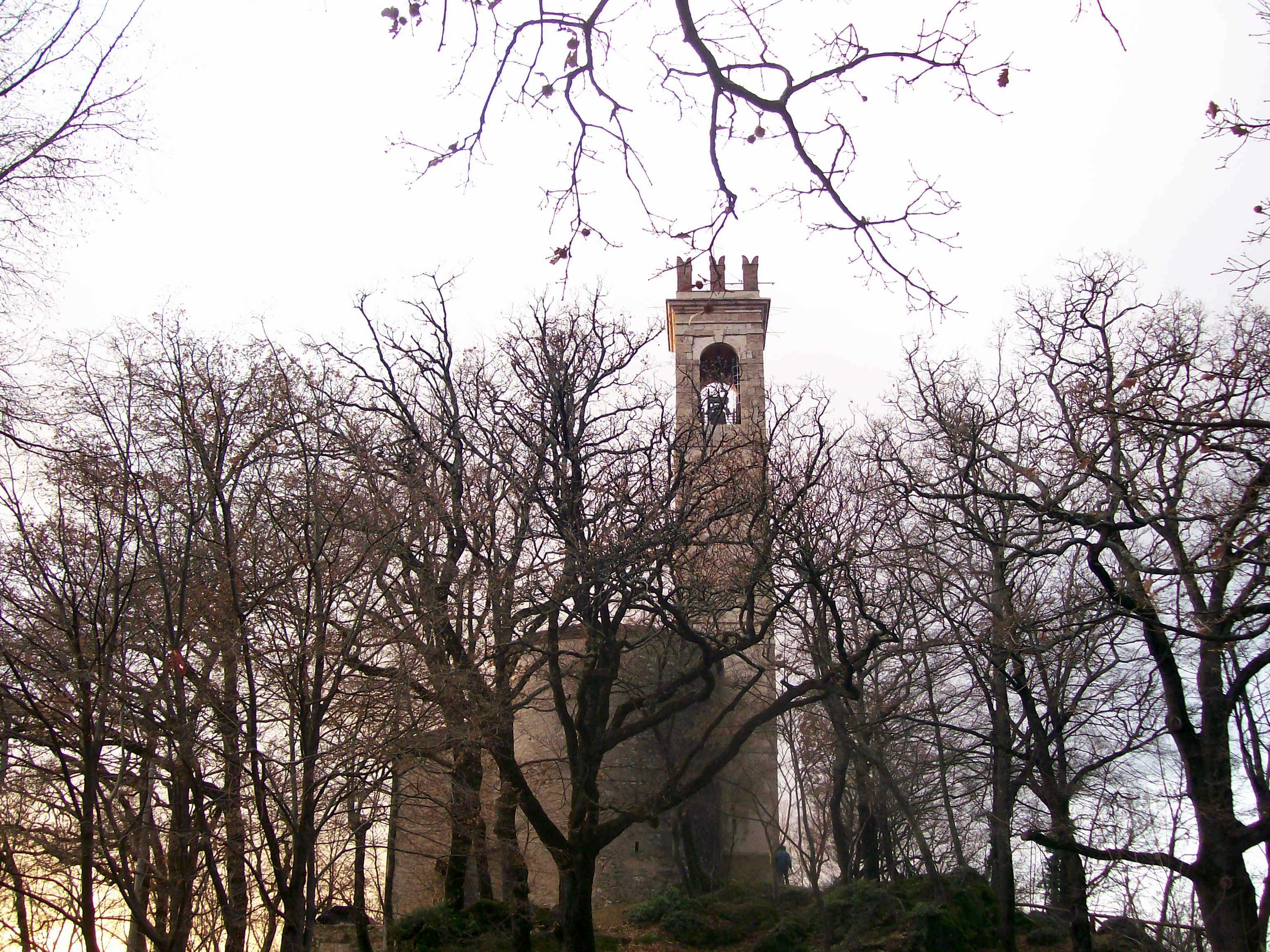
St. Peter's Abbey

== Twin towns ==
- Adlkofen, Germany, since 1988
