= Hohenthann =

- Municipality
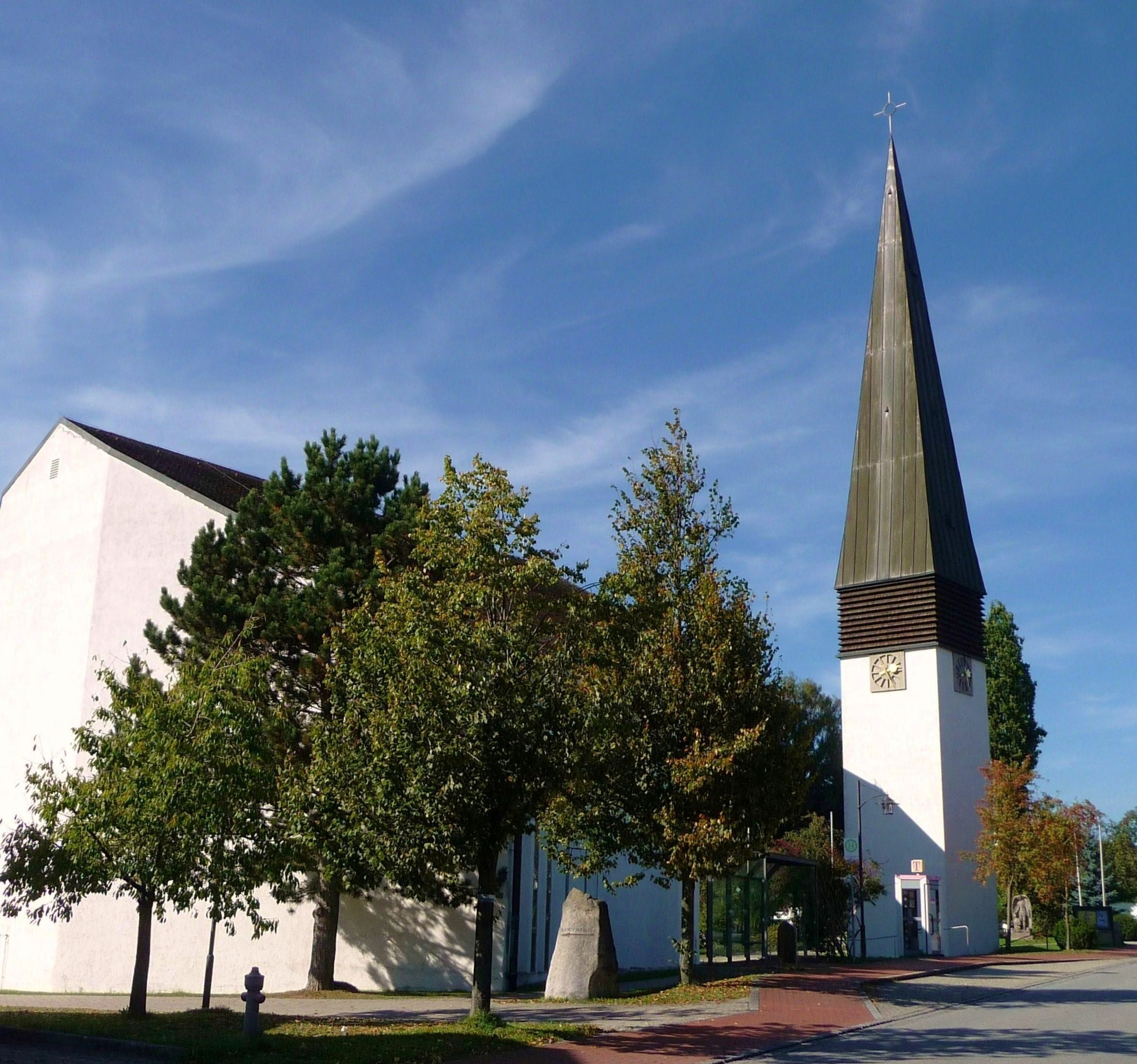
- Church of Saint Lawrence

- Coat of arms

- Location of Hohenthann within Landshut district
- Interactive map of Hohenthann
- Location within Germany Location within Bavaria
- Coordinates: 48°40′N 12°6′E
- Country: Germany
- State: Bavaria
- Admin. region: Niederbayern
- District: Landshut
- Subdivisions: 7 Ortsteile

Government
  - Mayor (2020–26): Andrea Weiß (CSU)

Area
  - Total: 68.32 km^{2} (26.38 sq mi)
- Elevation: 487 m (1,598 ft)

Population (2025-12-31)
  - Total: 4,297
  - Density: 62.90/km^{2} (162.9/sq mi)
- Time zone: UTC+01:00 (CET)
  - Summer (DST): UTC+02:00 (CEST)
- Postal codes: 84098
- Dialling codes: 08784
- Vehicle registration: LA
- Website: www.hohenthann.de

Hohenthann is a municipality in the district of Landshut in Bavaria in Germany.
