= Essenbach =

- Municipality
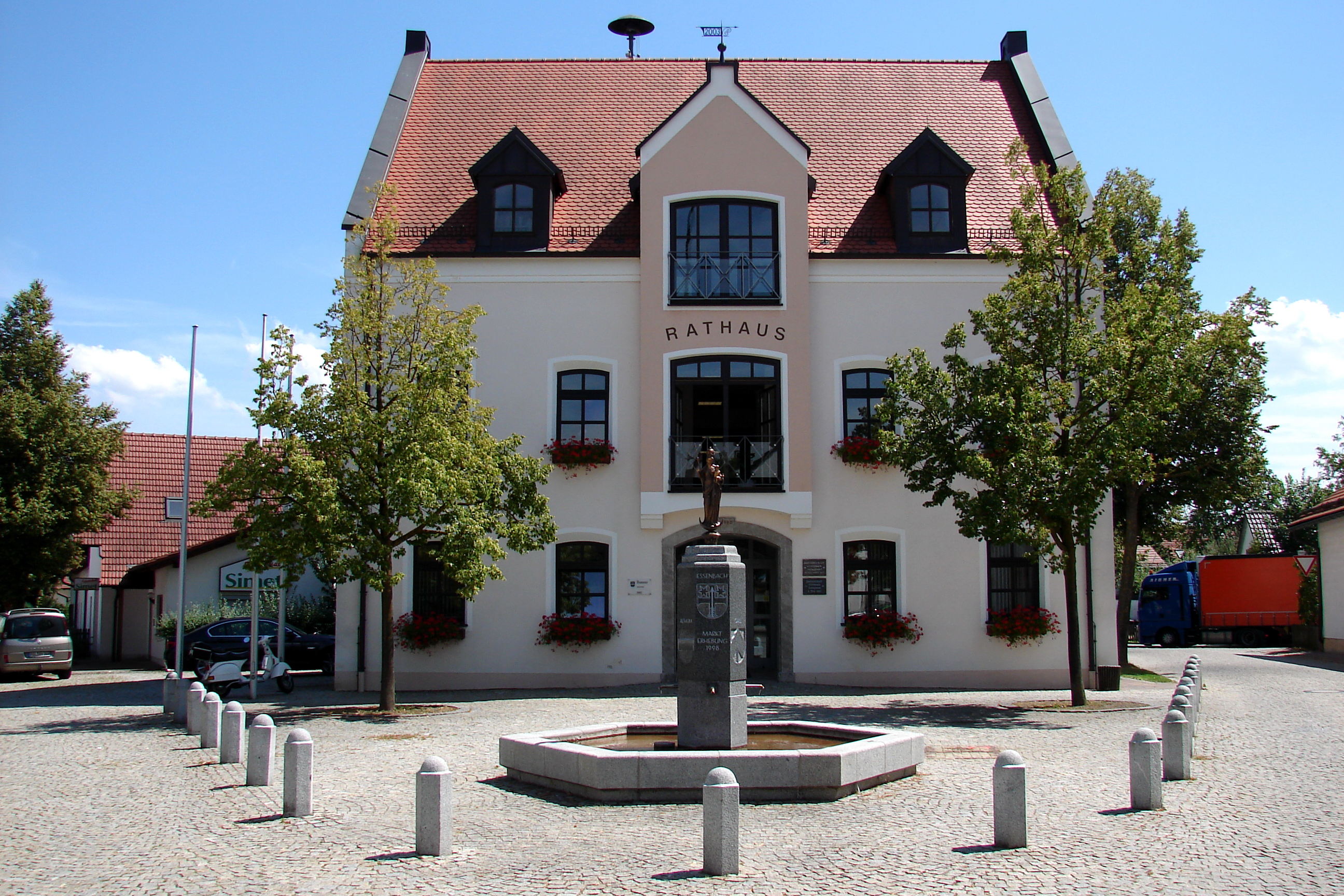
- Town hall

- Coat of arms

- Location of Essenbach within Landshut district
- Interactive map of Essenbach
- Location within Germany Location within Bavaria
- Coordinates: 48°37′N 12°13′E
- Country: Germany
- State: Bavaria
- Admin. region: Niederbayern
- District: Landshut

Government
  - Mayor (2020–26): Dieter Neubauer (CSU)

Area
  - Total: 83.6 km^{2} (32.3 sq mi)
- Elevation: 391 m (1,283 ft)

Population (2025-12-31)
  - Total: 11,970
  - Density: 143/km^{2} (371/sq mi)
- Time zone: UTC+01:00 (CET)
  - Summer (DST): UTC+02:00 (CEST)
- Postal codes: 84051
- Dialling codes: 08703
- Vehicle registration: LA
- Website: www.essenbach.de

Essenbach (German pronunciation: [ˈɛsn̩bax]) is a municipality in the district of Landshut, in Bavaria, Germany. It is situated 9 km northeast of Landshut.

It is the site of Isar Nuclear Power Plant.

== Twin towns ==
Essenbach is twinned with:

- Savigneux, Loire, France, since 1997
- Savignano Irpino, Italy, since 2005
