= Velden (Vils) =

- Municipality
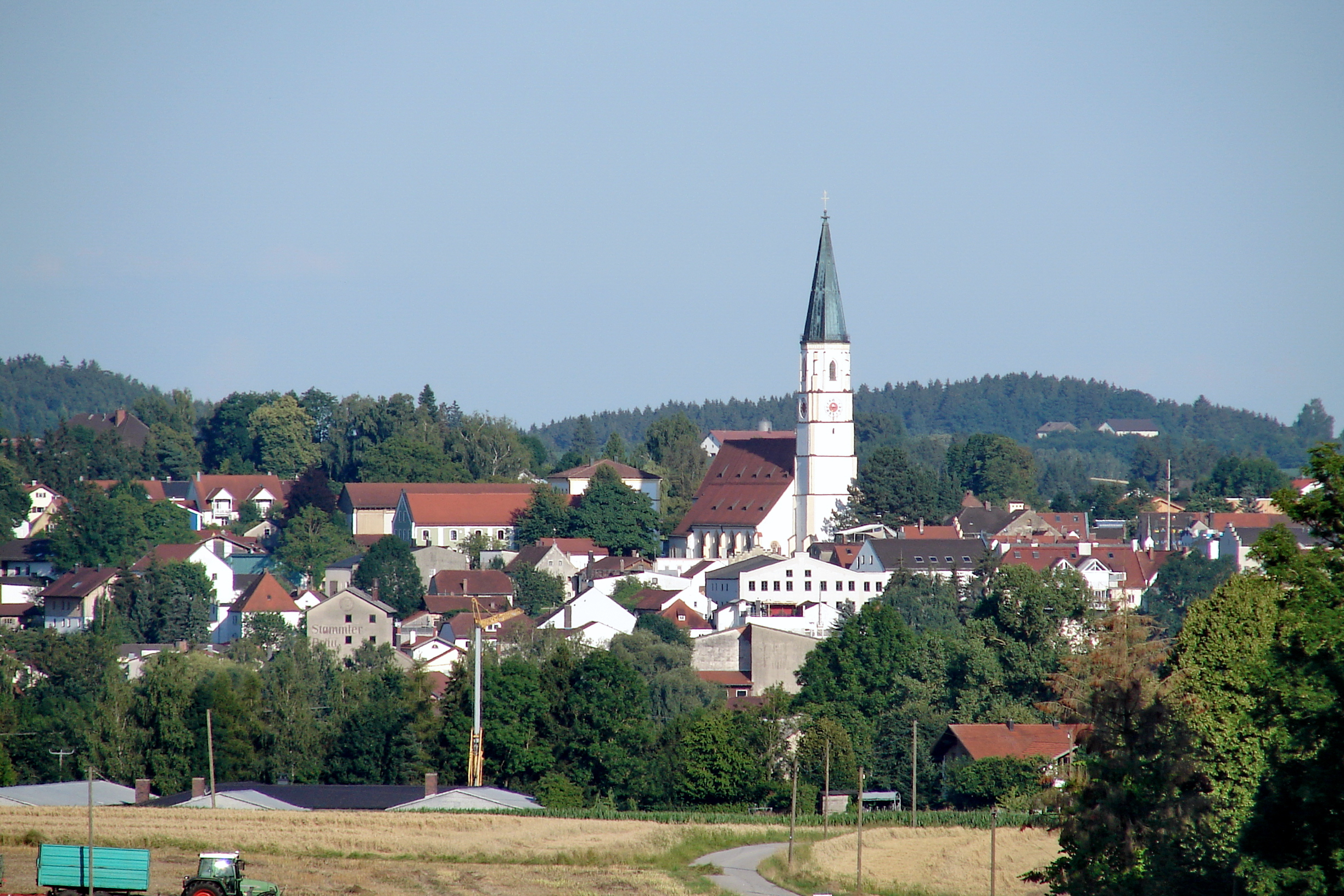
- Velden seen from the west

- Coat of arms

- Location of Velden within Landshut district
- Interactive map of Velden
- Location within Germany Location within Bavaria
- Coordinates: 48°22′N 12°15′E
- Country: Germany
- State: Bavaria
- Admin. region: Niederbayern
- District: Landshut
- Municipal assoc.: Velden

Government
  - Mayor (2020–26): Ludwig Greimel (FW)

Area
  - Total: 49.43 km^{2} (19.09 sq mi)
- Elevation: 477 m (1,565 ft)

Population (2025-12-31)
  - Total: 6,488
  - Density: 131.3/km^{2} (340.0/sq mi)
- Time zone: UTC+01:00 (CET)
  - Summer (DST): UTC+02:00 (CEST)
- Postal codes: 84149
- Dialling codes: 08742
- Vehicle registration: LA
- Website: https://www.markt-velden.de/

Velden (German pronunciation: [ˈfɛldn̩]) is a market town and municipality in the district of Landshut in Bavaria in Germany.

== Geography ==
Velden lies on the border from Lower Bavaria to Upper Bavaria. The river Vils runs through the town. Velden is about 64 kilometers northeast of Munich.

The municipality consists of 130 villages and communes

- Aichelsberg
- Aign
- Alteberspoint
- Asching
- Asenreit
- Atzmannsdorf
- Babing
- Bach
- Bachmühle
- Baueröd
- Biedenbach
- Biedersdorf
- Birnkam
- Brandstätt
- Bruck
- Burg
- Burghab
- Eberlsöd
- Eberspoint
- Eggersgrub
- Eglso
- Eichten
- Einäuglmühle
- Elling
- Erlach
- Erzmannsdorf
- Exenberg
- Feuchten
- Fischbach
- Forsthof
- Futteröd
- Futtersöd
- Geratsfurth
- Giglberg I
- Giglberg II
- Glocksberg
- Grünzing
- Gumpersberg
- Guntersberg
- Hackelsberg
- Hackenkam
- Haid
- Haideck
- Haldenweber
- Haselbach
- Heinhub
- Herrneck
- Hintelsberg
- Hinterkobl
- Hinteröd
- Hirschhof
- Hofbruck
- Höhenberg
- Holzen I
- Holzen II
- Holzhäuseln
- Hub
- Irreck
- Irrthal
- Kleinhaid
- Kleinvelden
- Koralden
- Kothlehen
- Kremshub
- Kreuz
- Kronwinkel
- Kühloh
- Lahn
- Lehen
- Leiten
- Lug
- Maierhof
- Maiersdorf
- Mariaberg
- Marsberg
- Martinsberg
- Miethal
- Mitterschweibach
- Mölling
- Moosing
- Nehaid
- Neunehaid
- Oberbabing
- Oberensbach
- Oberschweibach
- Obervilslern
- Ofen
- Paulusberg
- Pfenningsöd
- Pretzkobl
- Putzenberg
- Raffelberg
- Rimberg
- Ringofen
- Rothenwald
- Rothweg
- Rundthal
- Ruprechtsberg
- Sattelstatt
- Schafhausen
- Schapfthal
- Schlegelsreit
- Schmidten
- Schmitten
- Schöllamühle
- Schurfsöd
- Schwarzeck
- Schwarzmoos
- See
- Seidlthal
- Spindlhäusl
- Spitzlbach
- Stietenöd
- Stockham
- Straß
- Strohhof
- Unterensbach
- Unterschweibach
- Untervilslern
- Velden
- Viehweide
- Vils
- Vilssöhl
- Wagensberg
- Walding
- Walln
- Weiher
- Wildberg
- Willgrub
- Zweifurth

== History ==
The first mentioning of a Place named Feldin is found in 773. In 788 King Charles the Great displaced the bavarian Duke Tassilo III and made it a part of Francia. Later it became a Municipality with Market town status, but it is not sure when this happened as there does not exist a certificate of appointment. The first time the market status is mentioned was in a writ in 1394.

== Transport ==
Velden once had a railway connection to Dorfen via Taufkirchen. In 1994 the tracks were removed and converted to a now very popular cycle track. Velden lies on the Bundesstraße B 388. Frequent buses connect Velden to Vilsbiburg, Landshut and Dorfen. The nearest airport is Munich International Airport about 40 km to the southwest.

== Architecture & Art ==
In the center of Velden is St. Peter's church. It was built in two steps around 1450, newly renovated around 1990. Its 64m high tower is a main sight of Velden.

Velden also features an open-air museum with many sculptures of Georg Brenninger (born in Velden - later worked in Munich) for example the "Apoll" or the "Bergpredigt", also two fountains by the same sculptor can be seen in the center of the town.

In 1985 Bavarian Television filmed parts of the TV-Series Irgendwie und Sowieso in and around Velden. (Actors Ottfried Fischer, Elmar Wepper, Bruno Jonas and others)

== Notable people ==
- Georg Brenninger (1908–1988), sculptor
- Ruediger Lentz (*1947), journalist
- Gisela Stuart (*1955), British Labour Party ex MP
- Florian Oßner (*1980), member of German parliament (Bundestag) since 2013
- Sophie Kratzer (1989–2020), Ice hockey player

== Sister cities ==
- Roana, Italy, since 1976
- Aigrefeuille-d'Aunis, France, since 1986
