= Baierbach =

- Municipality
- Coat of arms

- Location of Baierbach within Landshut district
- Interactive map of Baierbach
- Location within Germany Location within Bavaria
- Coordinates: 48°25′N 12°12′E
- Country: Germany
- State: Bavaria
- Admin. region: Niederbayern
- District: Landshut
- Municipal assoc.: Altfraunhofen

Government
  - Mayor (2020–26): Aloisia Hausberger

Area
  - Total: 16.76 km^{2} (6.47 sq mi)
- Elevation: 418 m (1,371 ft)

Population (2025-12-31)
  - Total: 733
  - Density: 43.7/km^{2} (113/sq mi)
- Time zone: UTC+01:00 (CET)
  - Summer (DST): UTC+02:00 (CEST)
- Postal codes: 84171
- Dialling codes: 08705
- Vehicle registration: LA

Baierbach (German pronunciation: [ˈbaɪɐbax]) is a municipality in the district of Landshut in Bavaria in Germany.
