= Altfraunhofen (Verwaltungsgemeinschaft) =

- Verwaltungsgemeinschaft
- Location of Altfraunhofen within Landshut district
- Interactive map of Altfraunhofen
- Location within Germany Location within Bavaria
- Coordinates: 48°27′N 12°10′E
- Country: Germany
- State: Bavaria
- Admin. region: Lower Bavaria
- District: Landshut
- Seat: Altfraunhofen
- Subdivisions: 2 municipalities

Area
  - Total: 41.05 km^{2} (15.85 sq mi)

Population (2025-12-31)
  - Total: 3,304
  - Density: 80.49/km^{2} (208.5/sq mi)
- Time zone: UTC+01:00 (CET)
  - Summer (DST): UTC+02:00 (CEST)
- Website: vg-altfraunhofen.de

Altfraunhofen is a Verwaltungsgemeinschaft (municipal association) in the district of Landshut in Bavaria, Germany. Its seat is in Altfraunhofen.

It consists of the following municipalities:

1. Altfraunhofen
2. Baierbach
