= Furth, Lower Bavaria =

Furth
- Municipality
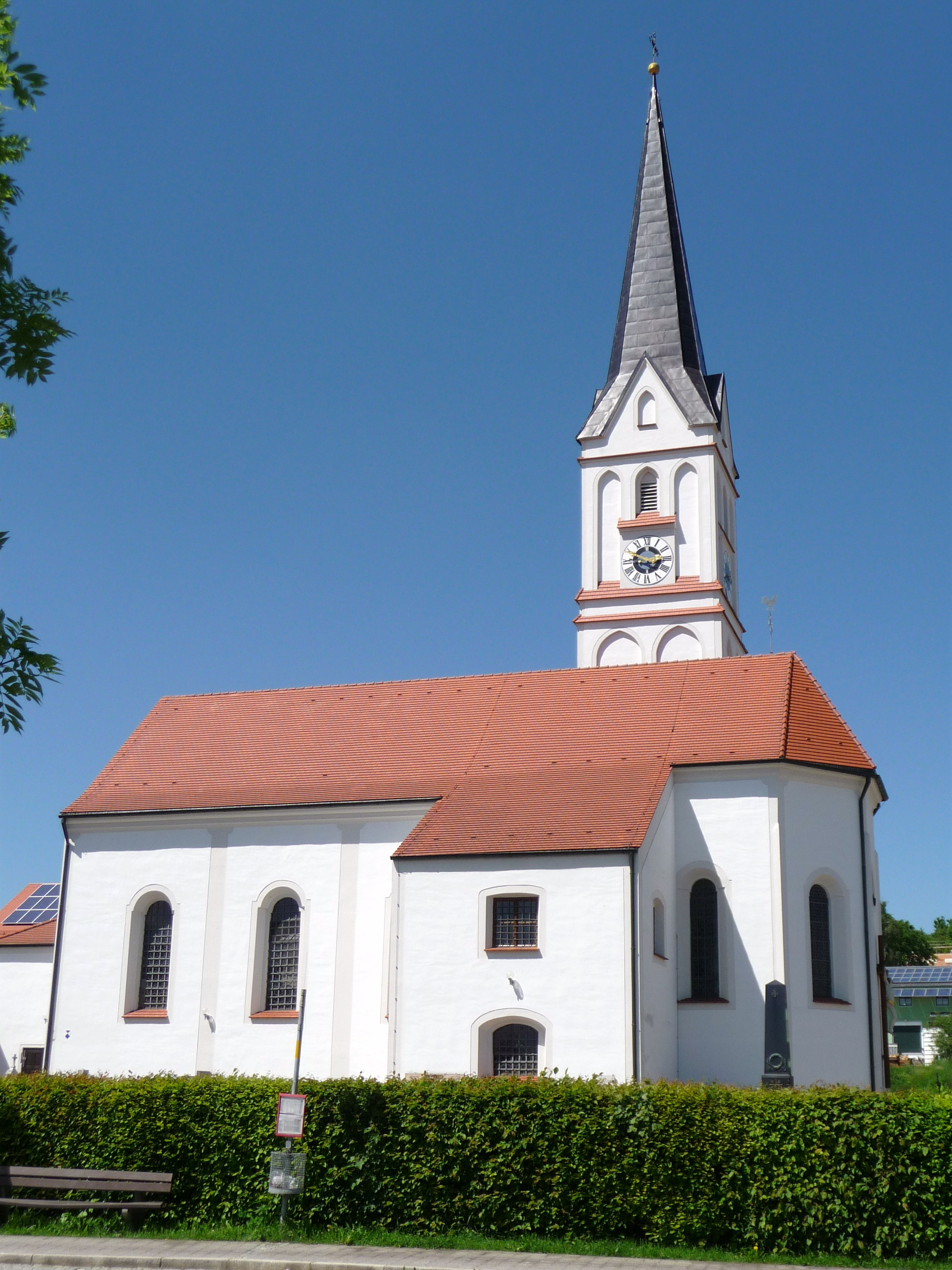
- Church of Saint Sebastian

- Coat of arms

- Location of Furth within Landshut district
- Interactive map of Furth
- Location within Germany Location within Bavaria
- Coordinates: 48°36′N 12°1′E
- Country: Germany
- State: Bavaria
- Admin. region: Niederbayern
- District: Landshut
- Municipal assoc.: Furth

Government
  - Mayor (2020–26): Andreas Horsche (FW)

Area
  - Total: 20.96 km^{2} (8.09 sq mi)
- Elevation: 429 m (1,407 ft)

Population (2025-12-31)
  - Total: 3,683
  - Density: 175.7/km^{2} (455.1/sq mi)
- Time zone: UTC+01:00 (CET)
  - Summer (DST): UTC+02:00 (CEST)
- Postal codes: 84095
- Dialling codes: 08704
- Vehicle registration: LA
- Website: www.furth-bei-landshut.de

Furth (German pronunciation: [fʊʁt]) is a municipality in the district of Landshut in Bavaria in Germany.

== Partner community ==
- Krupski Młyn, Poland

== Educational Institutions ==
- Maristen-Gymnasium Furth (high school)
- Volksschule Furth (elementary school)
