= Wörth an der Isar =

- Municipality
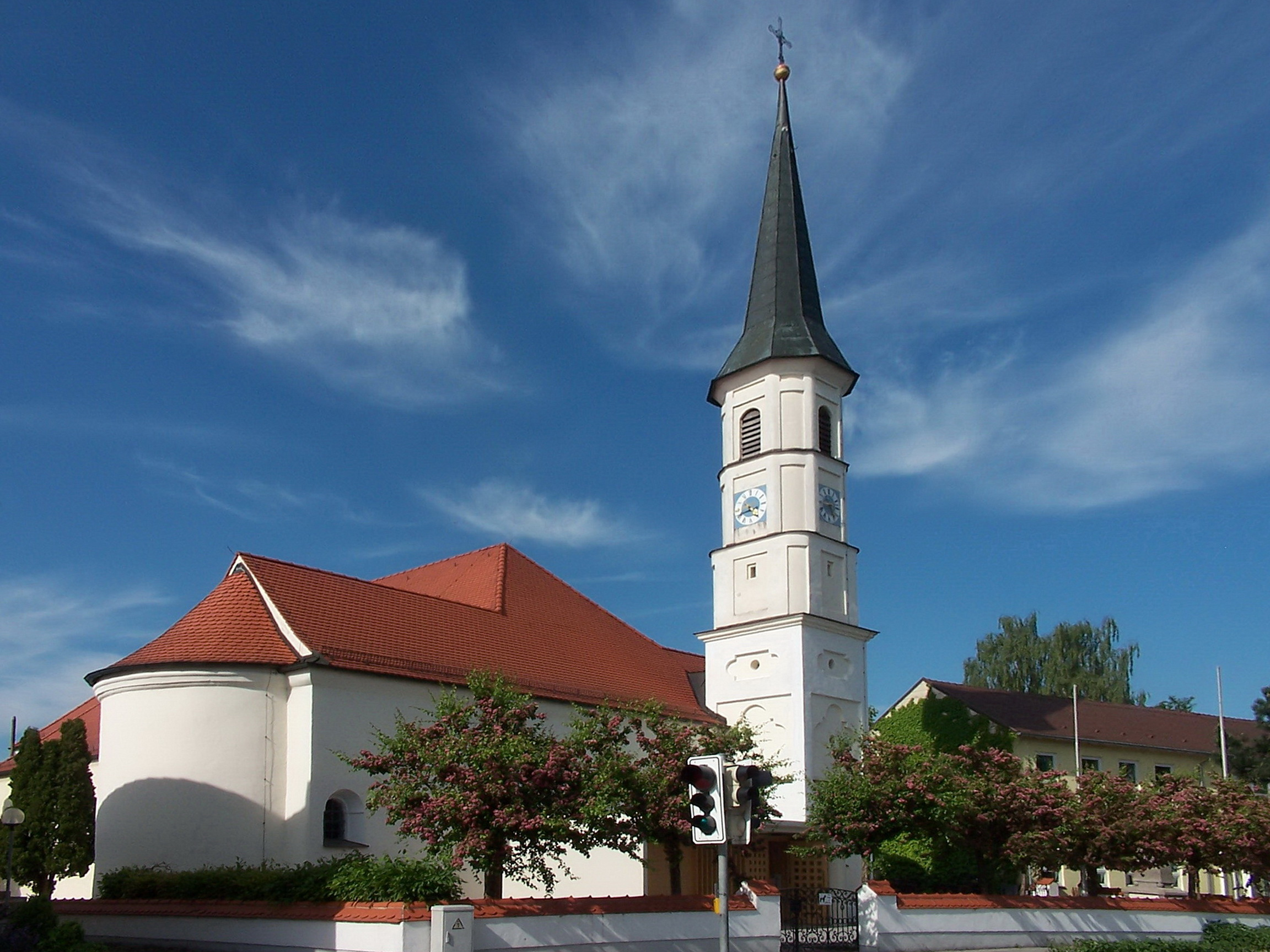
- Saint Lawrence Church

- Coat of arms

- Location of Wörth an der Isar within Landshut district
- Interactive map of Wörth an der Isar
- Location within Germany Location within Bavaria
- Coordinates: 48°37′N 12°21′E
- Country: Germany
- State: Bavaria
- Admin. region: Niederbayern
- District: Landshut
- Municipal assoc.: Wörth an der Isar

Government
  - Mayor (2020–26): Stefan Scheibenzuber

Area
  - Total: 4.84 km^{2} (1.87 sq mi)
- Elevation: 369 m (1,211 ft)

Population (2025-12-31)
  - Total: 3,275
  - Density: 677/km^{2} (1,750/sq mi)
- Time zone: UTC+01:00 (CET)
  - Summer (DST): UTC+02:00 (CEST)
- Postal codes: 84109
- Dialling codes: 08702
- Vehicle registration: LA
- Website: www.woerth-isar.de

Wörth an der Isar (German pronunciation: [ˈvœʁt ʔan deːɐ̯ ˈʔiːzaʁ], lit. 'Wörth on the Isar') is a municipality in the district of Landshut in Bavaria in Germany.
