= Weng, Bavaria =

Weng
- Municipality
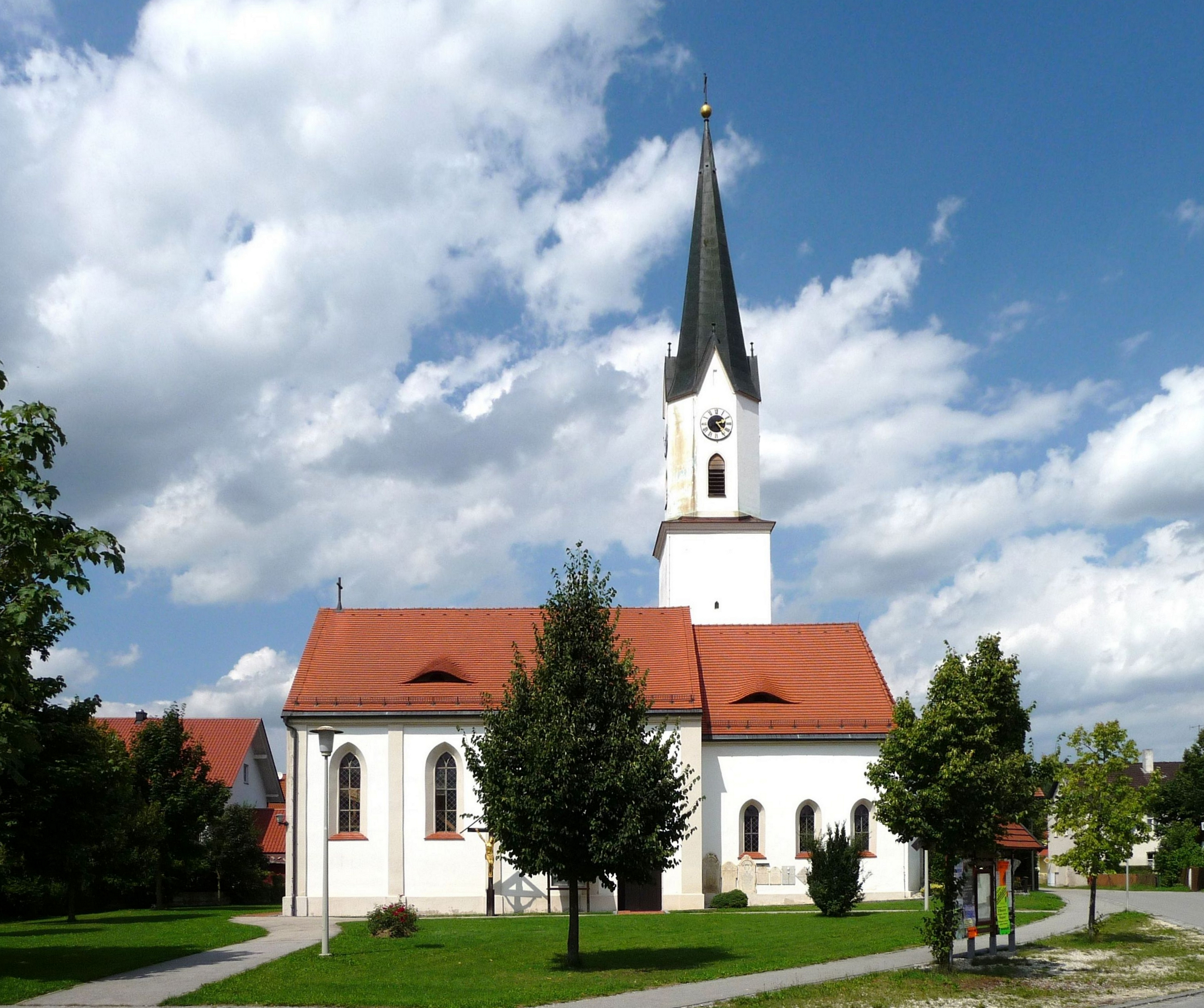
- Church of the Assumption of the Virgin Mary

- Coat of arms

- Location of Weng within Landshut district
- Interactive map of Weng
- Location within Germany Location within Bavaria
- Coordinates: 48°40′N 12°22′E
- Country: Germany
- State: Bavaria
- Admin. region: Niederbayern
- District: Landshut
- Municipal assoc.: Wörth an der Isar
- Subdivisions: 2 Ortsteile

Government
  - Mayor (2020–26): Robert Kiermeier

Area
  - Total: 15.62 km^{2} (6.03 sq mi)
- Elevation: 378 m (1,240 ft)

Population (2025-12-31)
  - Total: 1,406
  - Density: 90.01/km^{2} (233.1/sq mi)
- Time zone: UTC+01:00 (CET)
  - Summer (DST): UTC+02:00 (CEST)
- Postal codes: 84187
- Dialling codes: 08702
- Vehicle registration: LA
- Website: www.gemeinde-weng.de

Weng (German pronunciation: [vɛŋ]) is a municipality in the district of Landshut in Bavaria in Germany.
