= Wörth an der Isar (Verwaltungsgemeinschaft) =

- Verwaltungsgemeinschaft
- Location of Wörth an der Isar within Landshut district
- Interactive map of Wörth an der Isar
- Location within Germany Location within Bavaria
- Coordinates: 48°39′N 12°20′E
- Country: Germany
- State: Bavaria
- Admin. region: Lower Bavaria
- District: Landshut
- Seat: Wörth an der Isar
- Subdivisions: 3 municipalities

Area
  - Total: 55.26 km^{2} (21.34 sq mi)

Population (2025-12-31)
  - Total: 6,365
  - Density: 115.2/km^{2} (298.3/sq mi)
- Time zone: UTC+01:00 (CET)
  - Summer (DST): UTC+02:00 (CEST)
- Website: www.vg.woerth-isar.de

Wörth an der Isar is a Verwaltungsgemeinschaft (municipal association) in the district of Landshut in Bavaria, Germany. Its seat is in Wörth an der Isar.

It consists of the following municipalities:

1. Postau
2. Weng
3. Wörth an der Isar
