= Obersüßbach =

- Municipality
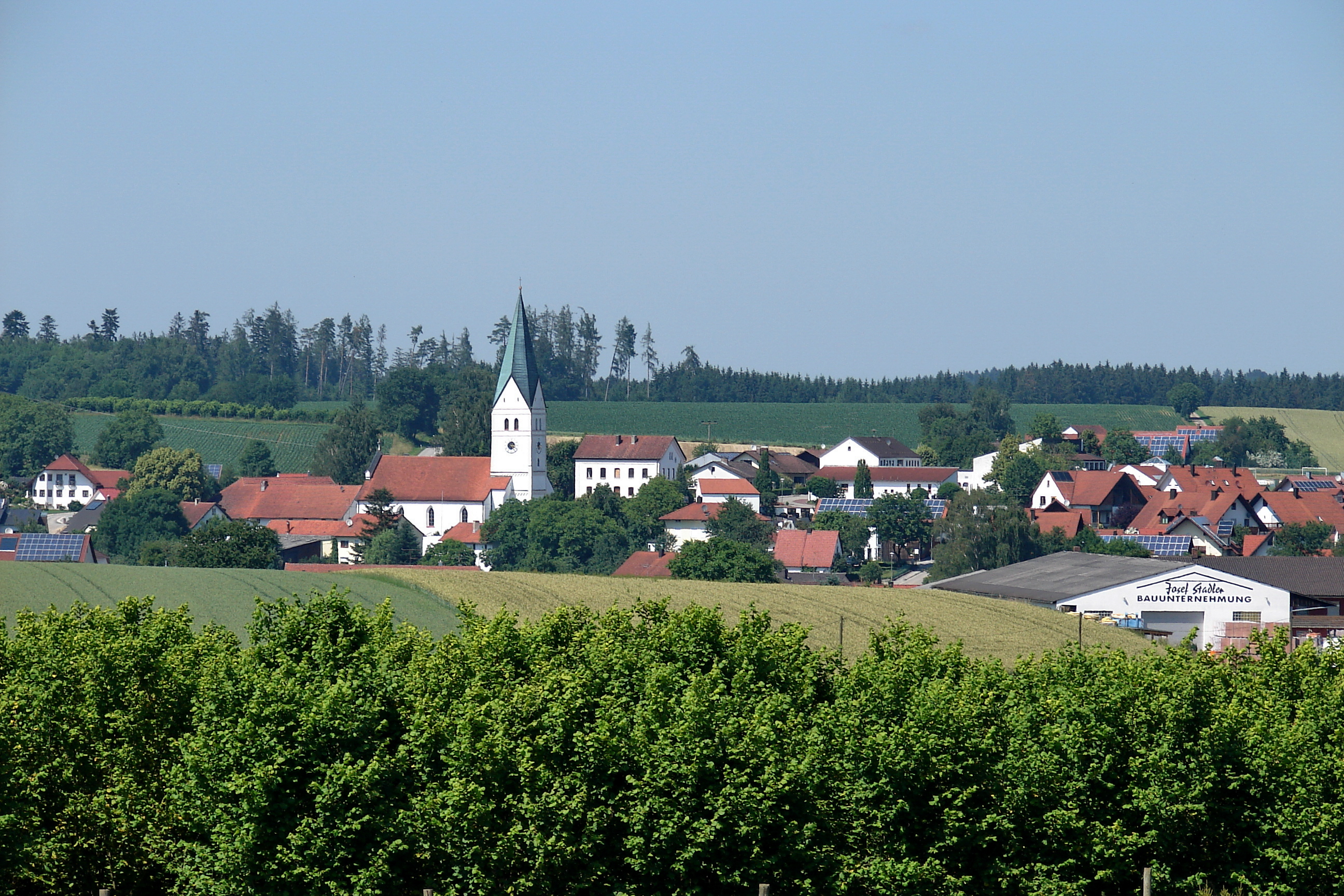
- Obersüßbach seen from the south

- Coat of arms

- Location of Obersüßbach within Landshut district
- Interactive map of Obersüßbach
- Location within Germany Location within Bavaria
- Coordinates: 48°36′N 11°56′E
- Country: Germany
- State: Bavaria
- Admin. region: Niederbayern
- District: Landshut
- Municipal assoc.: Furth

Government
  - Mayor (2020–26): Michael Ostermayr

Area
  - Total: 23.58 km^{2} (9.10 sq mi)
- Elevation: 472 m (1,549 ft)

Population (2025-12-31)
  - Total: 1,652
  - Density: 70.06/km^{2} (181.5/sq mi)
- Time zone: UTC+01:00 (CET)
  - Summer (DST): UTC+02:00 (CEST)
- Postal codes: 84101
- Dialling codes: 08708, 08754, 08766
- Vehicle registration: LA
- Website: www.obersuessbach.de

Obersüßbach is a municipality in the district of Landshut in Bavaria in Germany.

== People ==
- Georg Kaspar Nagler (1801-1866), art historian
