= Wurmsham =

- Municipality
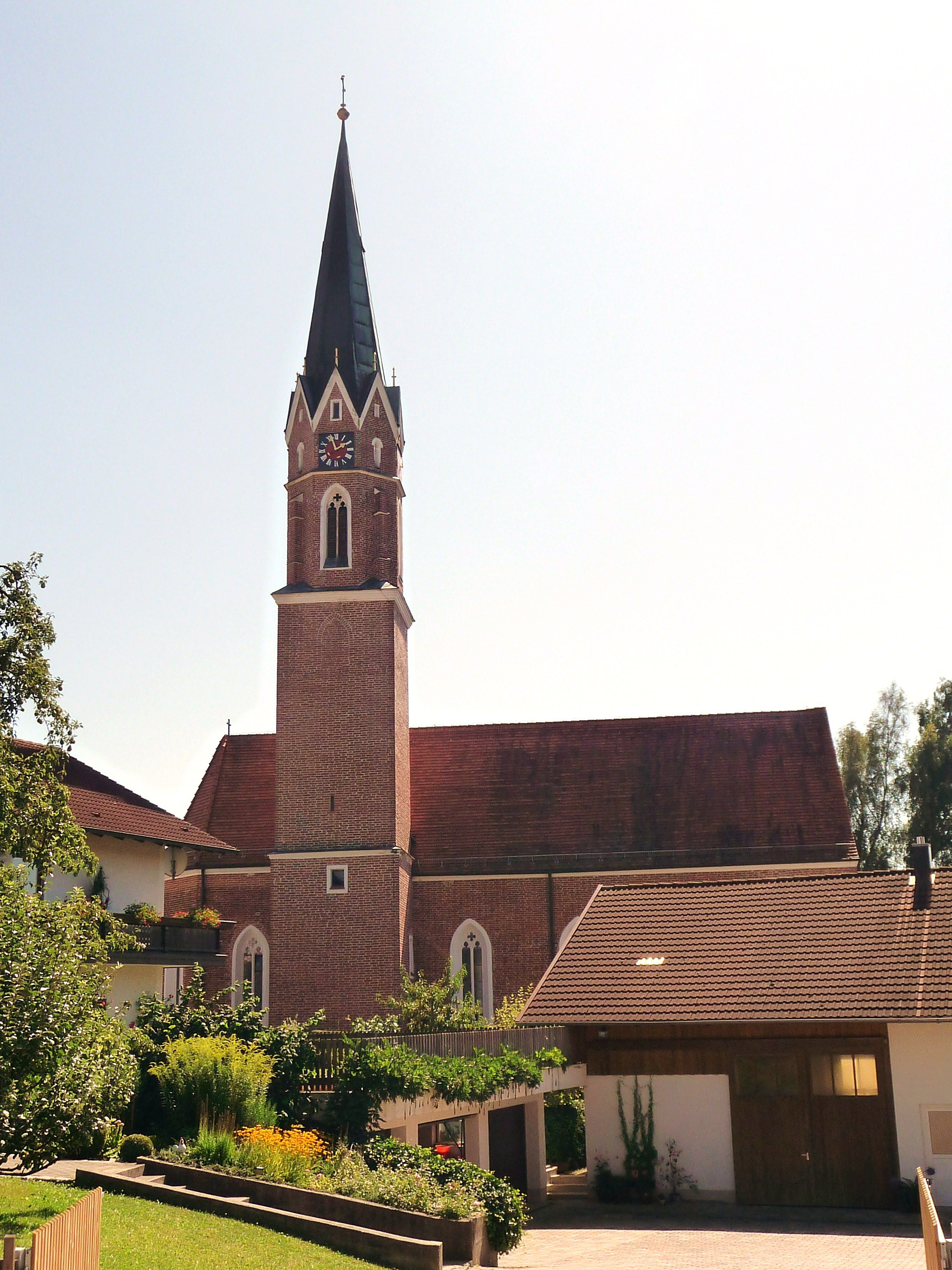
- Saint Nicholas Church

- Coat of arms

- Location of Wurmsham within Landshut district
- Interactive map of Wurmsham
- Location within Germany Location within Bavaria
- Coordinates: 48°21′N 12°20′E
- Country: Germany
- State: Bavaria
- Admin. region: Niederbayern
- District: Landshut
- Municipal assoc.: Velden
- Subdivisions: 2 Ortsteile

Government
  - Mayor (2020–26): Manuel Schott

Area
  - Total: 28.14 km^{2} (10.86 sq mi)
- Elevation: 480 m (1,570 ft)

Population (2025-12-31)
  - Total: 1,318
  - Density: 46.84/km^{2} (121.3/sq mi)
- Time zone: UTC+01:00 (CET)
  - Summer (DST): UTC+02:00 (CEST)
- Postal codes: 84189
- Dialling codes: 08725
- Vehicle registration: LA
- Website: www.wurmsham.de

Wurmsham is a municipality in the district of Landshut in Bavaria in Germany.
