= Velden (Verwaltungsgemeinschaft, Lower Bavaria) =

- Verwaltungsgemeinschaft
- Location of Velden within Landshut district
- Interactive map of Velden
- Location within Germany Location within Bavaria
- Coordinates: 48°22′N 12°15′E
- Country: Germany
- State: Bavaria
- Admin. region: Lower Bavaria
- District: Landshut
- Seat: Velden
- Subdivisions: 3 municipalities

Area
  - Total: 95.55 km^{2} (36.89 sq mi)

Population (2025-12-31)
  - Total: 8,868
  - Density: 92.81/km^{2} (240.4/sq mi)
- Time zone: UTC+01:00 (CET)
  - Summer (DST): UTC+02:00 (CEST)
- Website: www.vg-velden.de

Velden is a Verwaltungsgemeinschaft (municipal association) in the district of Landshut in Bavaria, Germany. Its seat is in Velden.

It consists of the following municipalities:

1. Neufraunhofen
2. Velden
3. Wurmsham
