= Neufraunhofen =

- Municipality
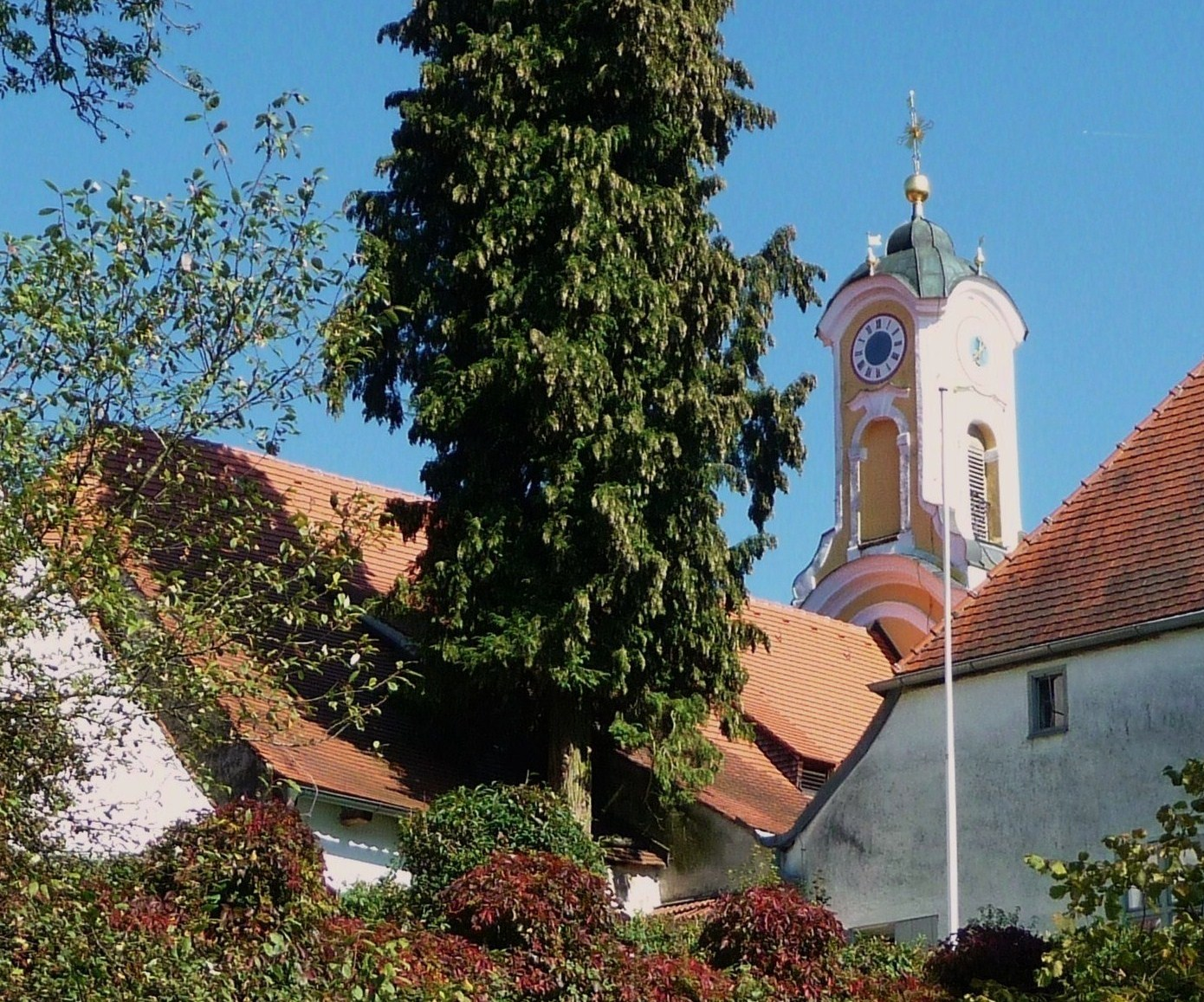
- Church of Saint John the Baptist at the Neufraunhofen Castle

- Coat of arms

- Location of Neufraunhofen within Landshut district
- Interactive map of Neufraunhofen
- Location within Germany Location within Bavaria
- Coordinates: 48°24′N 12°13′E
- Country: Germany
- State: Bavaria
- Admin. region: Niederbayern
- District: Landshut
- Municipal assoc.: Velden
- Subdivisions: 2 Ortsteile

Government
  - Mayor (2020–26): Anton Maier

Area
  - Total: 17.94 km^{2} (6.93 sq mi)
- Elevation: 495 m (1,624 ft)

Population (2025-12-31)
  - Total: 1,062
  - Density: 59.20/km^{2} (153.3/sq mi)
- Time zone: UTC+01:00 (CET)
  - Summer (DST): UTC+02:00 (CEST)
- Postal codes: 84181
- Dialling codes: 08742
- Vehicle registration: LA
- Website: www.neufraunhofen.de

Neufraunhofen is a municipality in the district of Landshut in Bavaria in Germany.
