= Weihmichl =

- Municipality
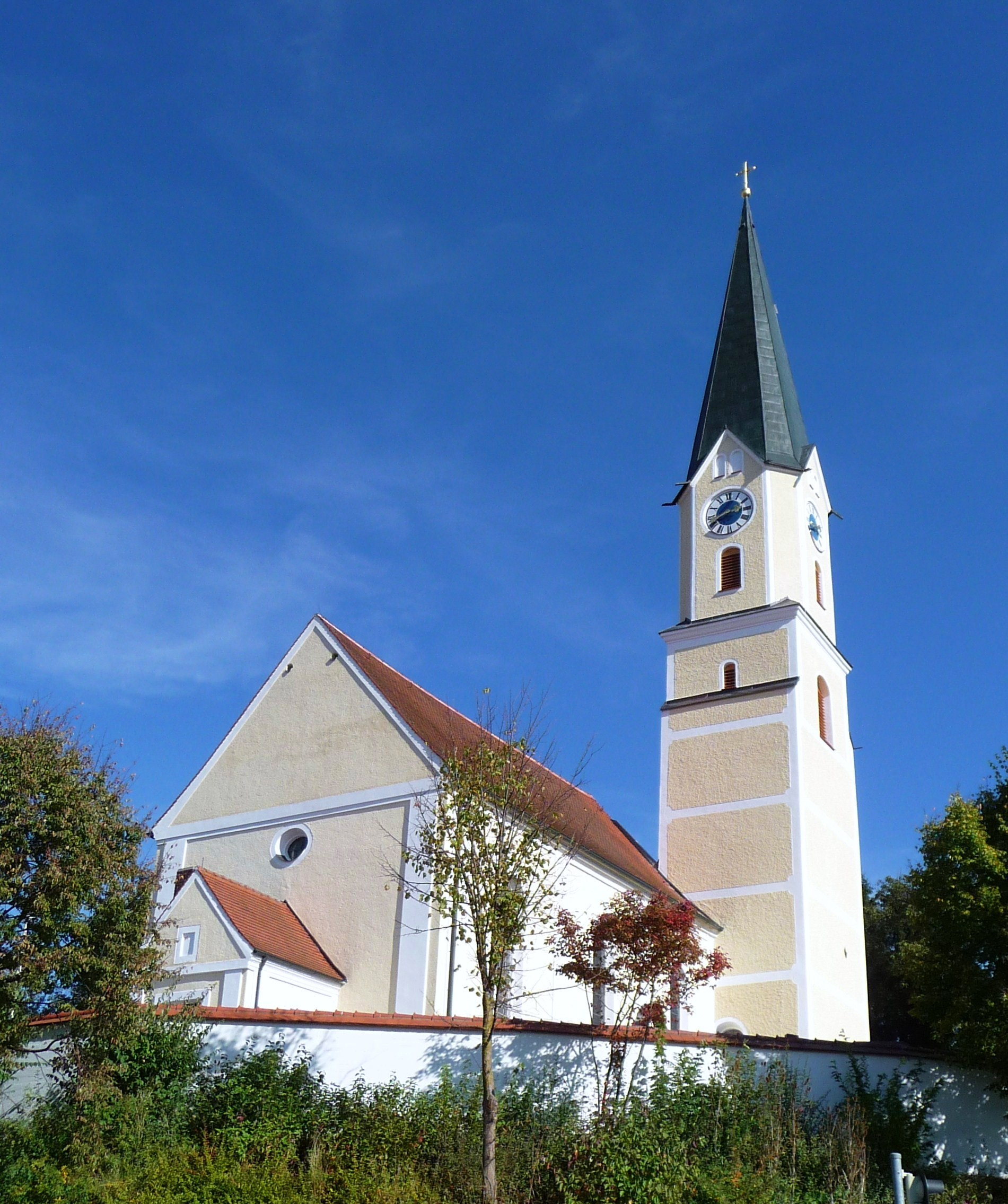
- Church of Saint Willibald

- Coat of arms

- Location of Weihmichl within Landshut district
- Interactive map of Weihmichl
- Location within Germany Location within Bavaria
- Coordinates: 48°36′N 12°53′E
- Country: Germany
- State: Bavaria
- Admin. region: Niederbayern
- District: Landshut
- Municipal assoc.: Furth
- Subdivisions: 3 Ortsteile

Government
  - Mayor (2020–26): Hans-Peter Deifel (CSU)

Area
  - Total: 32.16 km^{2} (12.42 sq mi)
- Elevation: 440 m (1,440 ft)

Population (2025-12-31)
  - Total: 2,444
  - Density: 76.00/km^{2} (196.8/sq mi)
- Time zone: UTC+01:00 (CET)
  - Summer (DST): UTC+02:00 (CEST)
- Postal codes: 84107
- Dialling codes: 08704, 08708
- Vehicle registration: LA
- Website: www.gemeinde-weihmichl.de

Weihmichl is a municipality in the district of Landshut in Bavaria in Germany.
