= Kumhausen =

- Municipality
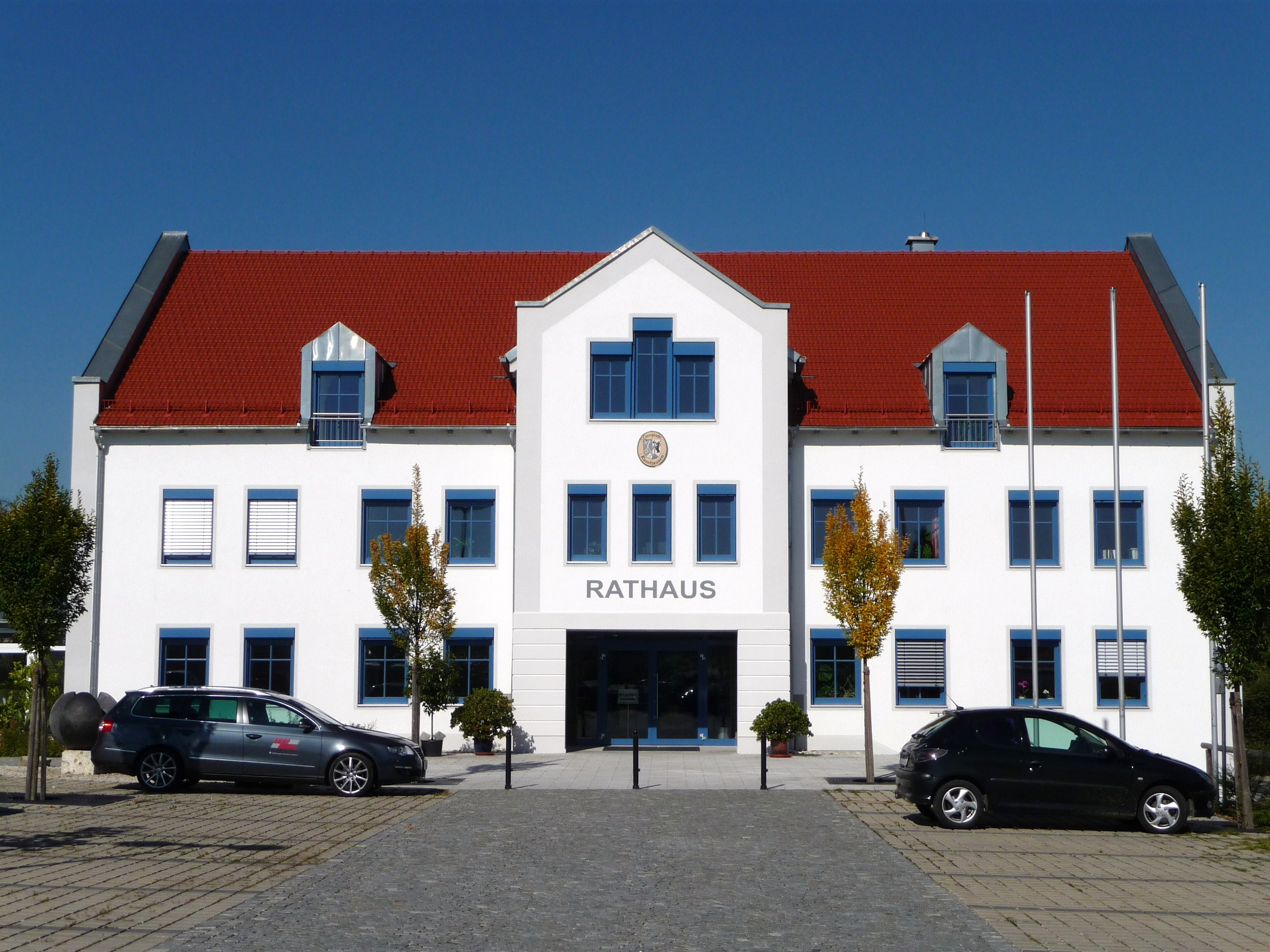
- Town hall

- Coat of arms

- Location of Kumhausen within Landshut district
- Interactive map of Kumhausen
- Location within Germany Location within Bavaria
- Coordinates: 48°30′N 12°10′E
- Country: Germany
- State: Bavaria
- Admin. region: Niederbayern
- District: Landshut
- Subdivisions: 5 Ortsteile

Government
  - Mayor (2020–26): Thomas Huber (FW)

Area
  - Total: 37.07 km^{2} (14.31 sq mi)
- Elevation: 437–510 m (1,434–1,673 ft)

Population (2025-12-31)
  - Total: 5,599
  - Density: 151.0/km^{2} (391.2/sq mi)
- Time zone: UTC+01:00 (CET)
  - Summer (DST): UTC+02:00 (CEST)
- Postal codes: 84036
- Dialling codes: 08743
- Vehicle registration: LA
- Website: www.kumhausen.de

Kumhausen is a municipality in the district of Landshut in Bavaria in Germany.
