= Niederaichbach =

- Municipality
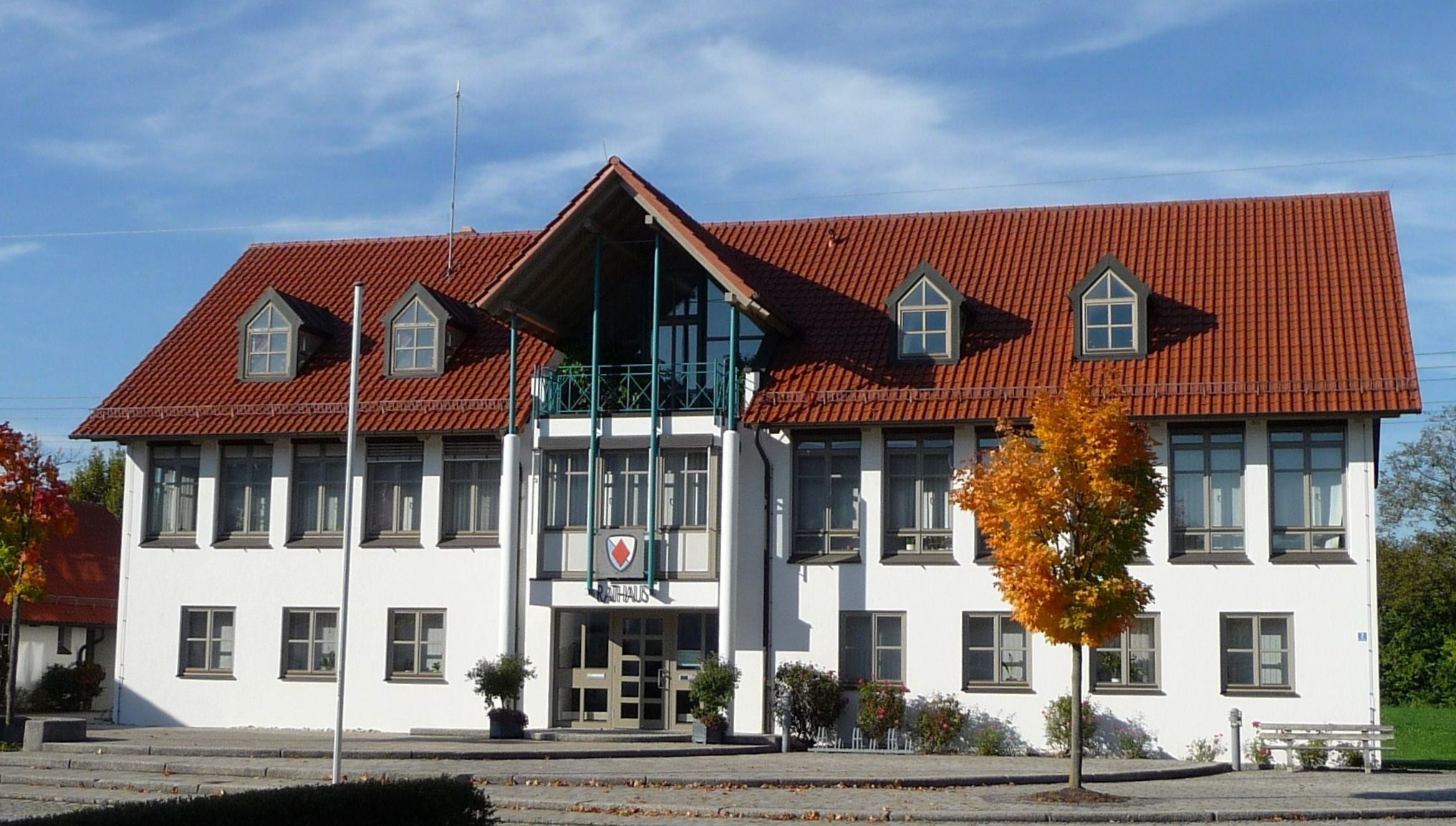
- Town hall

- Coat of arms

- Location of Niederaichbach within Landshut district
- Interactive map of Niederaichbach
- Location within Germany Location within Bavaria
- Coordinates: 48°36′N 12°19′E
- Country: Germany
- State: Bavaria
- Admin. region: Niederbayern
- District: Landshut
- Subdivisions: 4 Ortsteile

Government
  - Mayor (2020–26): Josef Klaus

Area
  - Total: 34.06 km^{2} (13.15 sq mi)
- Elevation: 376 m (1,234 ft)

Population (2025-12-31)
  - Total: 4,234
  - Density: 124.3/km^{2} (322.0/sq mi)
- Time zone: UTC+01:00 (CET)
  - Summer (DST): UTC+02:00 (CEST)
- Postal codes: 84100
- Dialling codes: 08702
- Vehicle registration: LA
- Website: www.gemeinde-niederaichbach.de

Niederaichbach is a municipality in the district of Landshut in Bavaria in Germany.

== Cultural heritages ==
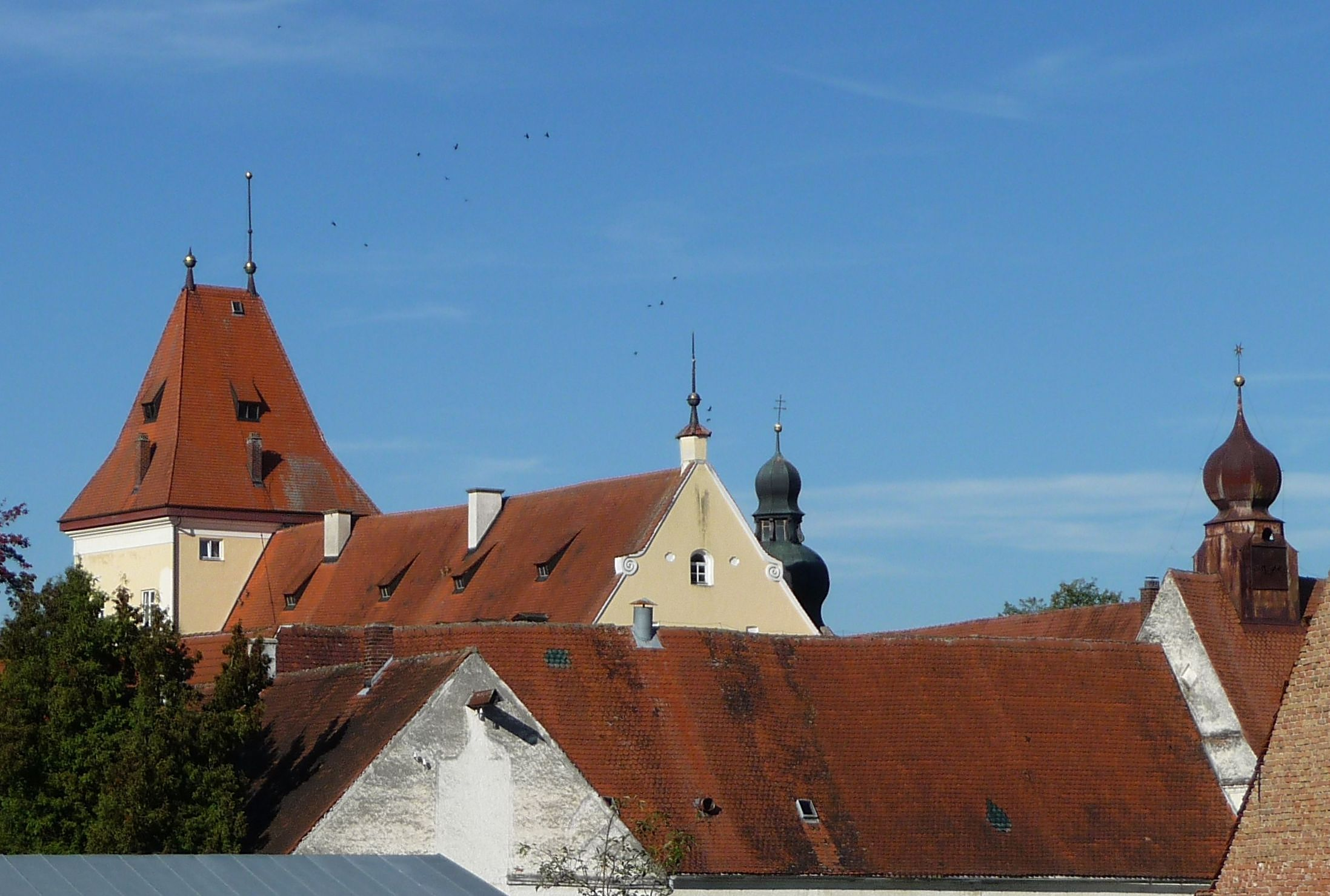
Schloss Niederaichbach

Niederaichbach Castle was the location of Kloster Kaltenthal (Kaltenthal nunnery) of the ARD sitcom Um Himmels Willen
