= Altfraunhofen =

- Municipality
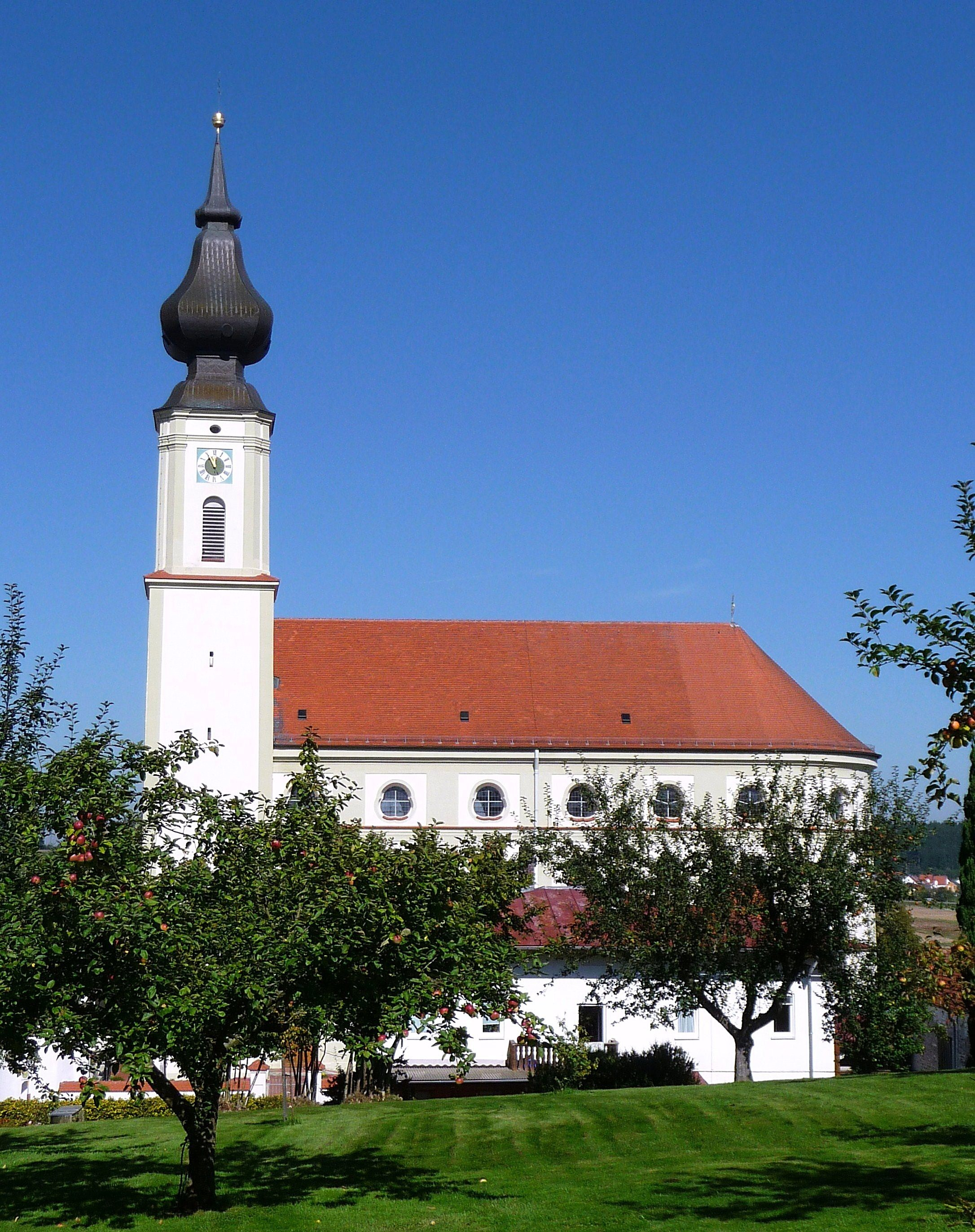
- Church of Saint Nicholas

- Coat of arms

- Location of Altfraunhofen within Landshut district
- Interactive map of Altfraunhofen
- Location within Germany Location within Bavaria
- Coordinates: 48°26′55″N 12°10′02″E
- Country: Germany
- State: Bavaria
- Admin. region: Niederbayern
- District: Landshut
- Municipal assoc.: Altfraunhofen

Government
  - Mayor (2020–26): Johann Schreff (FW)

Area
  - Total: 24.28 km^{2} (9.37 sq mi)
- Elevation: 462–474 m (1,516–1,555 ft)

Population (2025-12-31)
  - Total: 2,571
  - Density: 105.9/km^{2} (274.3/sq mi)
- Time zone: UTC+01:00 (CET)
  - Summer (DST): UTC+02:00 (CEST)
- Postal codes: 84169
- Dialling codes: 08705
- Vehicle registration: LA
- Website: www.vg-altfraunhofen.de

Altfraunhofen is a municipality in the district of Landshut in Bavaria in Germany.

== History ==
Before 1800, Altfrauhofen was ruled by the "Baron of Fraunhofen." However, the imperial immediacy of Fraunhofen was not recognized by the Bavarian elector-princes. When Napoleon established the Confederation of the Rhine in 1806, the city became part of Bavaria. The town was transferred to its current district during the Bavarian administrative reforms of 1818.
