= Hermann Rieder =

Hermann Hugo Rieder
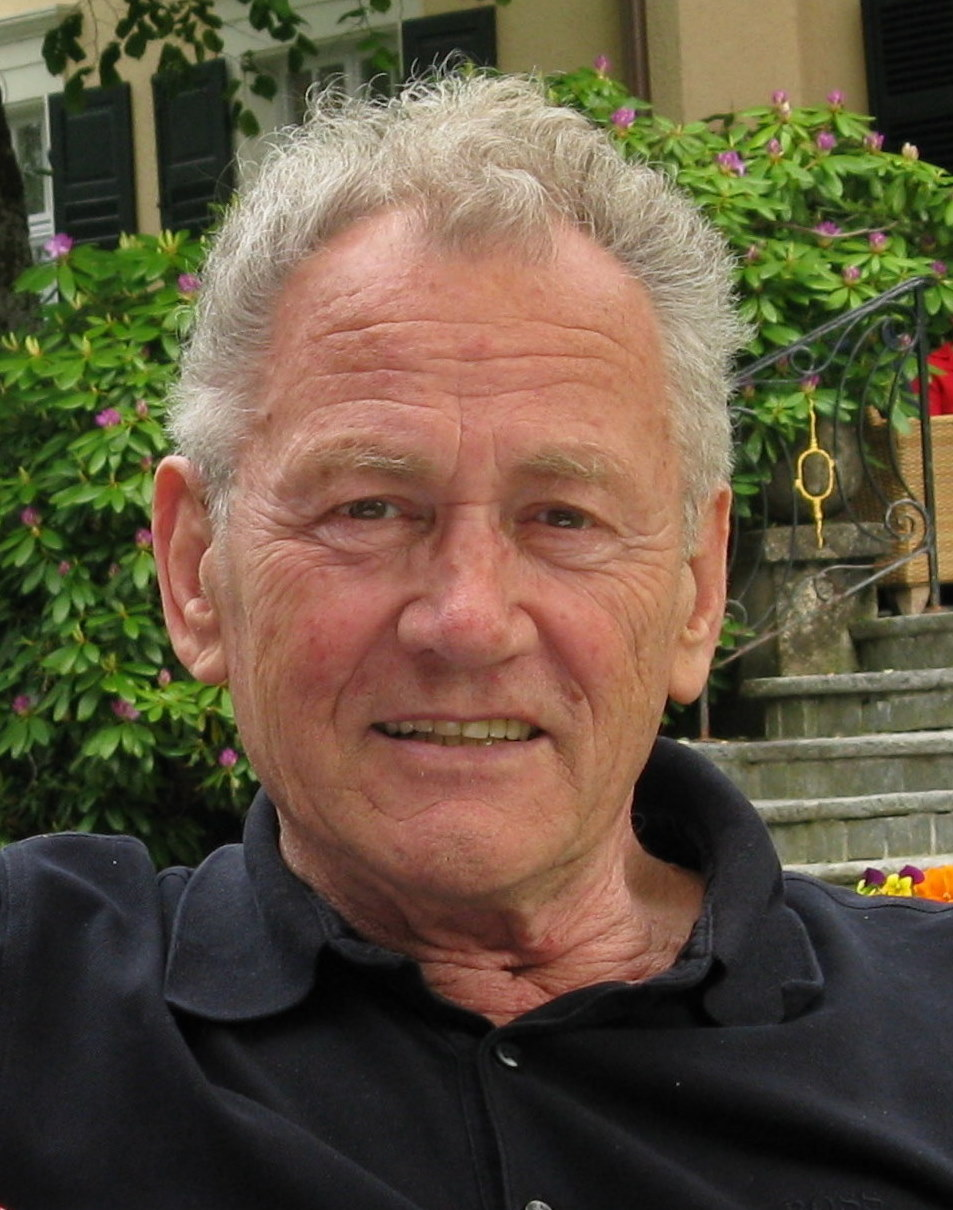
- Rieder in June 2008 (age 80)

Personal information
- Nationality: German
- Born: 3 May 1928 Altfraunhofen, Germany
- Died: 22 August 2009 (aged 81) Gaiberg, Germany
- Resting place: Gaiberg, Germany; 49.3641°N 8.7482°E
- Occupations: Professor; Sports scientist
- Employers: University of Würzburg; University of Heidelberg
- Spouse: Ulrike Rieder

Sport
- Sport: Athletics
- Event: Javelin
Medal record
Men's javelin
Representing Germany
World Student Games
Gold medal – first place	1955 San Sebastián	Javelin

Hermann Rieder (3 May 1928 in Altfraunhofen (near Landshut) – 22 August 2009 in Gaiberg (near Heidelberg) was a German javelin thrower, trainer and sports scientist.

== Athlete and Trainer ==
Hermann Rieder was a member of the German National Team as an active javelin thrower. In the years 1952-1960 he was the second-placed German in this discipline. In 1951 and 1955 respectively he won the gold medal in the World University Games, the forerunner of the Universiade. His best distance was 76.68m.

From 1966 to 1972, Rieder was Coach of the German National Team for javelin throwing in the German Track and Field Federation (see German Olympic Sports Confederation). As a trainer, he coached among others Olympic champion Klaus Wolfermann, the 1979 World University Games champion Helmut Schreiber and the 1986 European champion Klaus Tafelmeier.

== Scientist ==
After his studies in the fields of German language and literature, history, and physical education in Munich, Hermann Rieder was active as an assistant professor at the University of Würzburg. From 1968 to 1994 he directed the Institute of Physical Education at the University of Heidelberg, which was renamed in 1973 to the Institute of Sport and Sport Science. Concurrently he was the founder of the Federal Institute of Sport Science, which he led as director from 1970 to 1973. Significant high points of his work included the establishment of Sport science as a scientific discipline and the promotion of sport for the disabled. Rieder was also General Secretary of the International Society of Sport Psychology.

Hermann Rieder united multiple facets of sport science and excelled at the knitting together of theoretical and practical expertise. In his works can be found contributions from sports psychology, kinematics, training theory and the interdisciplinary field of sport therapy which he invented. As a generalist of his field he encompassed a wide range of sport science subjects, ranging from talent scouting in tennis to exercise programs for HIV sufferers. Rieder was convinced of the power of communication, which exemplified itself in the number of national and international conventions he organized.

From the beginning of his time as an educator, Rieder was a promoter of growth in sport science, witnessed by more than 40 doctoral degrees and habilitations he supervised. Generations of students profited from his abilities to motivate and to lead in scientific work. Since 1997, he was honored by the Institute of Sport and Sport Science with a prize named for him, which is awarded yearly for the best qualification work by a student.

After becoming professor emeritus, based on his education and experience in sport, Hermann Rieder dedicated himself to the theme of the "Cultural History of the Javelin". In 2001 he launched the exhibit "Javelin Throwing - from Stone-age Hunter to Olympic Champion" in Mannheim and held lectures on this topic.

== Awards ==
Hermann Rieder held, among others, the following awards:

- The Federal Cross of Merit, Knight's Cross
- The Federal Cross of Merit, 1st Class
- Philip Noel-Baker Award
- 1997 Distinguished International Sport Psychologist Award
