= Altdorf, Lower Bavaria =

Altdorf
- Municipality
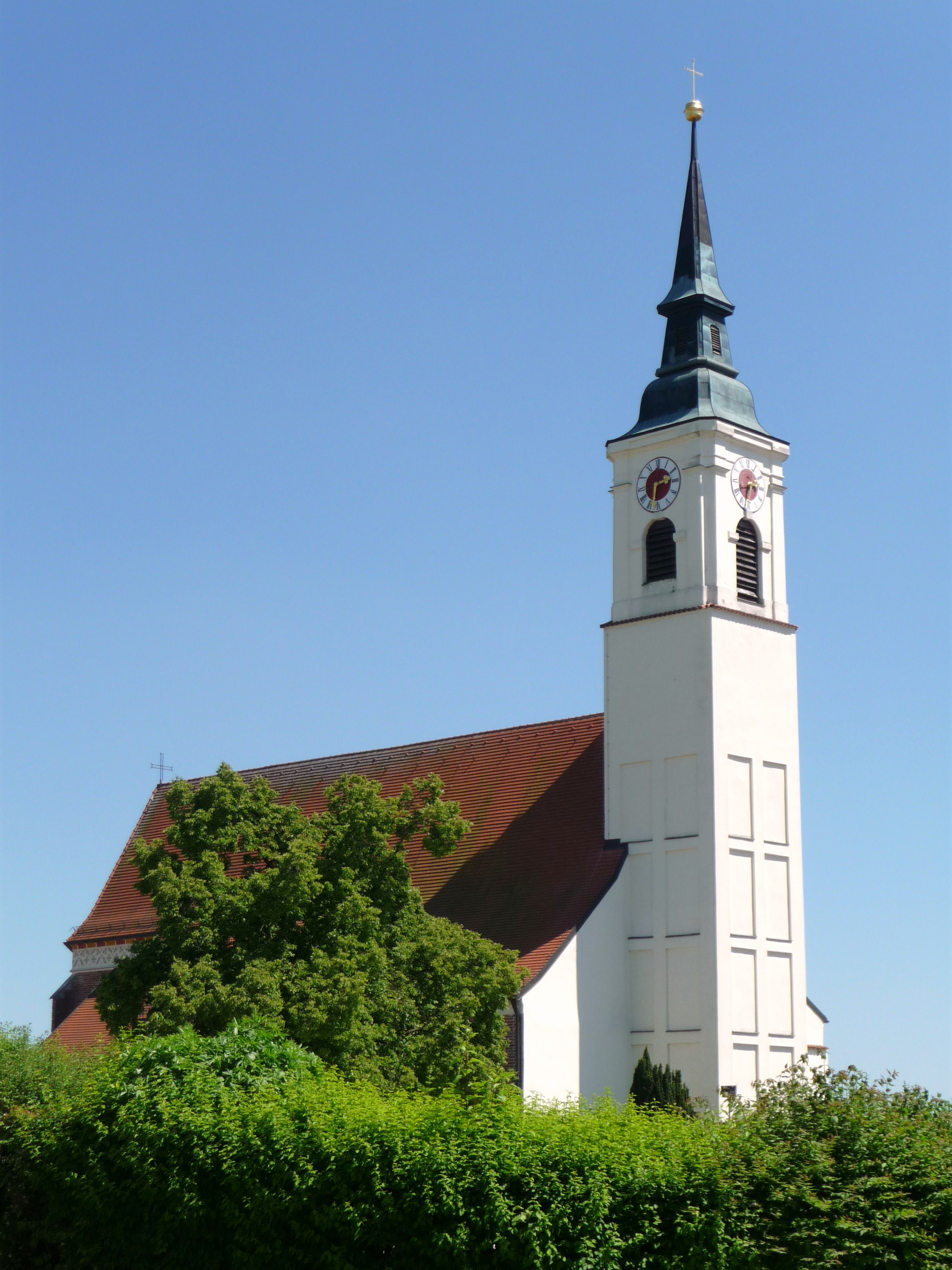
- Church of the Visitation of the Virgin Mary

- Coat of arms

- Location of Altdorf within Landshut district
- Interactive map of Altdorf
- Location within Germany Location within Bavaria
- Coordinates: 48°34′N 12°07′E
- Country: Germany
- State: Bavaria
- Admin. region: Niederbayern
- District: Landshut

Government
  - Mayor (2020–26): Sebastian Stanglmaier

Area
  - Total: 22.99 km^{2} (8.88 sq mi)
- Elevation: 396 m (1,299 ft)

Population (2025-12-31)
  - Total: 11,407
  - Density: 496.2/km^{2} (1,285/sq mi)
- Time zone: UTC+01:00 (CET)
  - Summer (DST): UTC+02:00 (CEST)
- Postal codes: 84032
- Dialling codes: 0871
- Vehicle registration: LA
- Website: www.markt-altdorf.de

Altdorf (German pronunciation: [ˈaltˌdɔʁf]) is a market town and municipality in the district of Landshut, in Bavaria, Germany. It is situated 4 km northwest of Landshut.
