= Tiefenbach, Landshut =

Tiefenbach
- Municipality
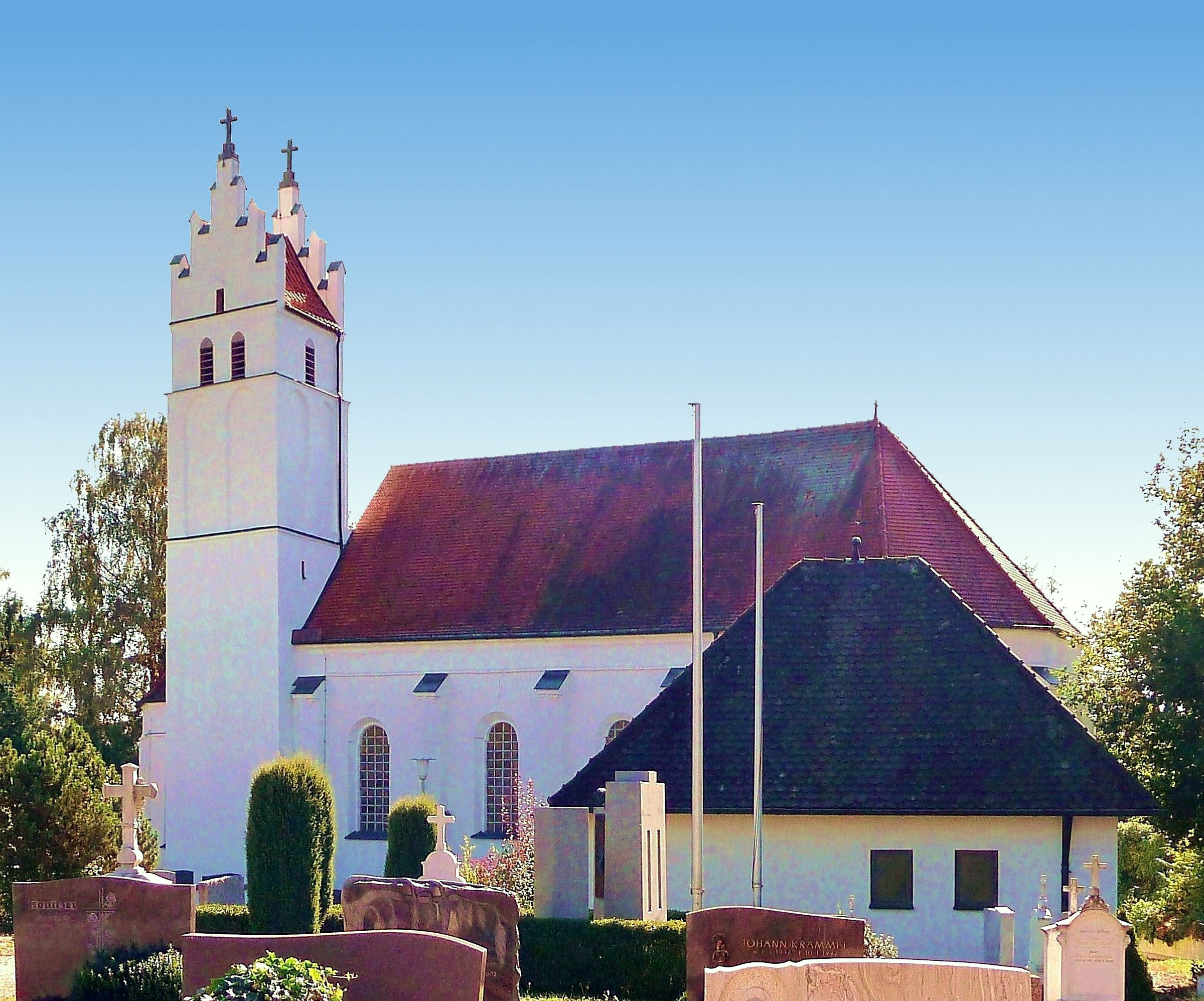
- Church of Saint Ulrich

- Coat of arms

- Location of Tiefenbach within Landshut district
- Interactive map of Tiefenbach
- Location within Germany Location within Bavaria
- Coordinates: 48°30′10″N 12°5′56″E
- Country: Germany
- State: Bavaria
- Admin. region: Niederbayern
- District: Landshut

Government
  - Mayor (2020–26): Birgit Gatz

Area
  - Total: 24.71 km^{2} (9.54 sq mi)
- Elevation: 454 m (1,490 ft)

Population (2025-12-31)
  - Total: 3,931
  - Density: 159.1/km^{2} (412.0/sq mi)
- Time zone: UTC+01:00 (CET)
  - Summer (DST): UTC+02:00 (CEST)
- Postal codes: 84184
- Dialling codes: 08709
- Vehicle registration: LA
- Website: www.tiefenbach-gemeinde.de

Tiefenbach (German pronunciation: [ˈtiːfn̩bax]) is a municipality in the district of Landshut in Bavaria in Germany. The river Isar flows through the municipality.
