= Bruckberg, Lower Bavaria =

Bruckberg
- Municipality
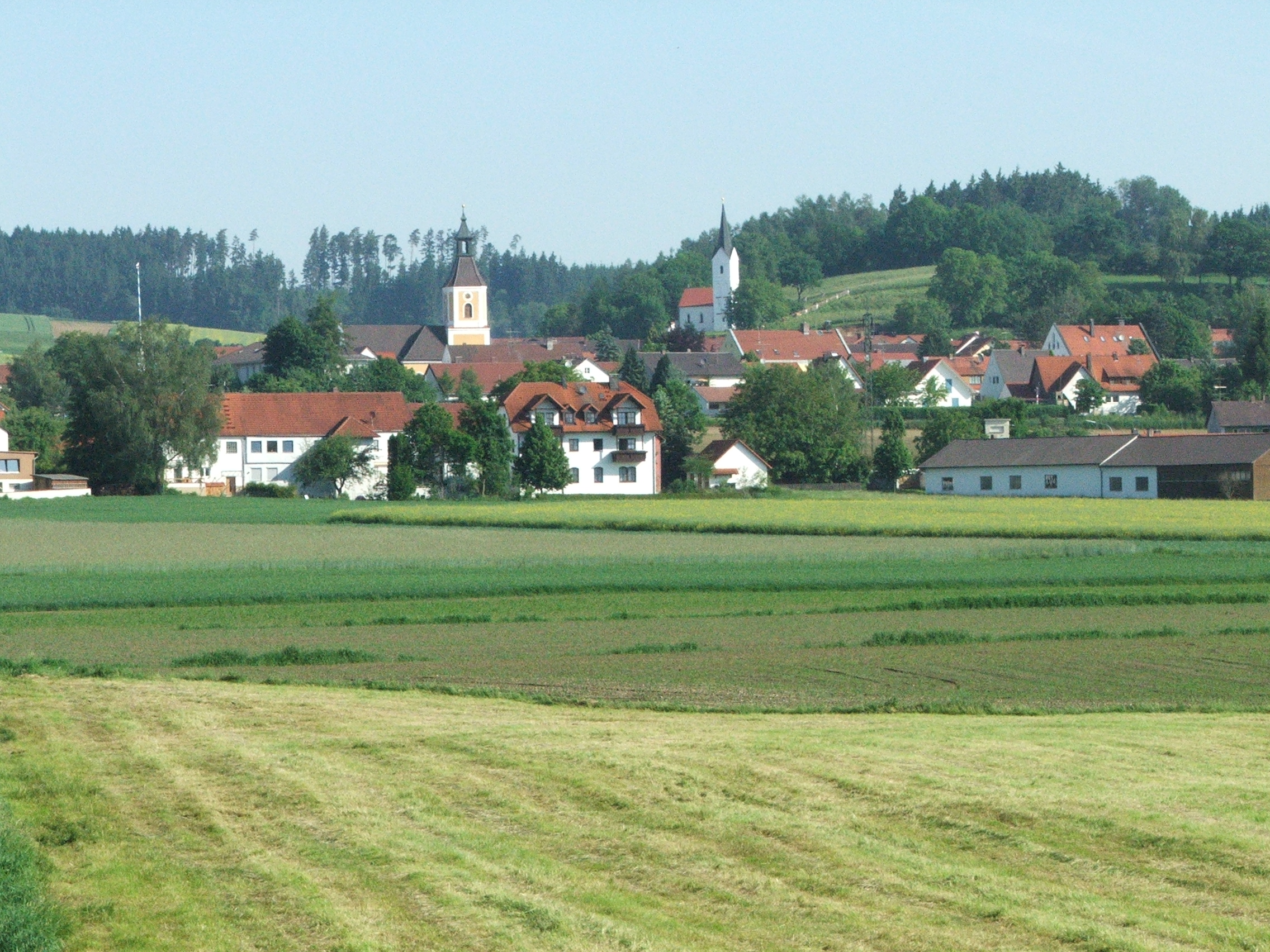
- View on Bruckberg with the churches of St. James (left) and St. Paul (right)

- Coat of arms

- Location of Bruckberg within Landshut district
- Interactive map of Bruckberg
- Location within Germany Location within Bavaria
- Coordinates: 48°32′N 12°0′E
- Country: Germany
- State: Bavaria
- Admin. region: Niederbayern
- District: Landshut

Government
  - Mayor (2020–26): Rudolf Radlmeier

Area
  - Total: 51.09 km^{2} (19.73 sq mi)
- Elevation: 427 m (1,401 ft)

Population (2025-12-31)
  - Total: 5,704
  - Density: 111.6/km^{2} (289.2/sq mi)
- Time zone: UTC+01:00 (CET)
  - Summer (DST): UTC+02:00 (CEST)
- Postal codes: 84079
- Dialling codes: 08765
- Vehicle registration: LA
- Website: www.bruckberg.org

Bruckberg (German pronunciation: [ˈbʁʊkbɛʁk]) is a municipality in the district of Landshut in Bavaria in Germany. Until 30 April 1978 it belonged to the upper bavarian district of Freising.
