= Geisenhausen =

- Municipality
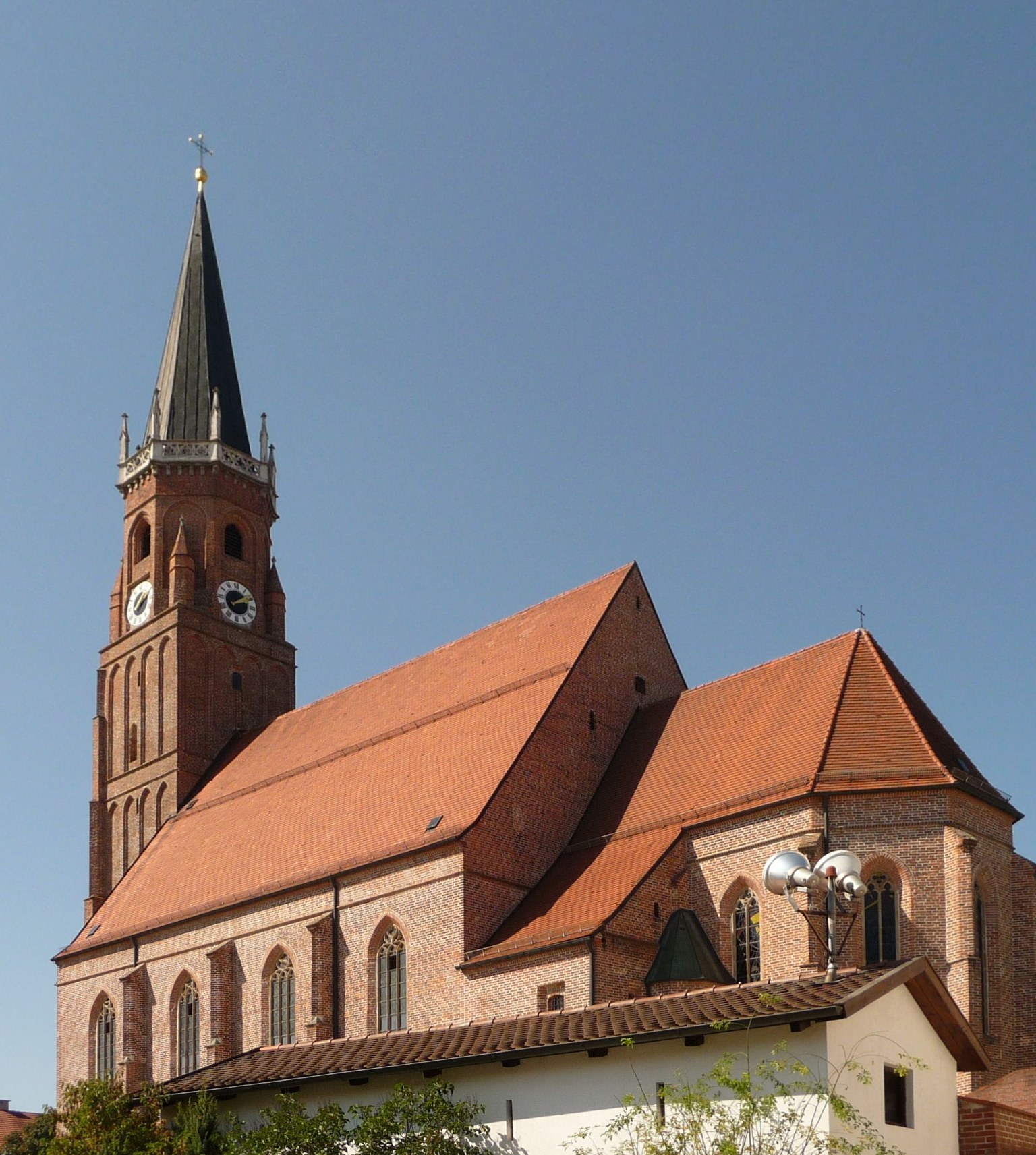
- Church of Saint Martin in Geisenhausen

- Coat of arms

- Location of Geisenhausen within Landshut district
- Interactive map of Geisenhausen
- Location within Germany Location within Bavaria
- Coordinates: 48°28′N 12°15′E
- Country: Germany
- State: Bavaria
- Admin. region: Lower Bavaria
- District: Landshut

Government
  - Mayor (2020–26): Josef Reff (FW)

Area
  - Total: 62.5 km^{2} (24.1 sq mi)
- Elevation: 460 m (1,510 ft)

Population (2025-12-31)
  - Total: 7,212
  - Density: 115/km^{2} (299/sq mi)
- Time zone: UTC+01:00 (CET)
  - Summer (DST): UTC+02:00 (CEST)
- Postal codes: 84144
- Dialling codes: 08743
- Vehicle registration: LA
- Website: www.geisenhausen.de

Geisenhausen (German pronunciation: [ɡaɪzn̩ˈhaʊzn̩]) is a municipality with market town status in the district of Landshut, in Bavaria, Germany. It is situated 14 km southeast of Landshut in the valley of the Kleine Vils.

== History ==
Geisenhausen was first mentioned in a document in 980 and received market rights in 1393.

== Administrative division ==
- Albanstetten
- Diemannskirchen
- Hörlkam
- Hermannskirchen
- Holzhausen
- Geisenhausen
- Salksdorf
- Johannesbergham
- Westersbergham
- Stephansbergham
- Irlach

== Sights ==
The parish church St. Martin from the second half of the 15th century is a brick building in gothic style similar to its larger namesake in Landshut. Historic middle-class houses line part of market square and main road. The church of St. Theobald was a destiny of pilgrimages from about 1390 to 1790.

== Infrastructure ==
Geisenhausen is linked with the rail system of the Deutsche Bahn. The Bundesstraße 299, an important road, bypasses the market town.

== Periodic events ==
- Rosenmontagszug (Rose Monday Parade) of the carnival club Tollemogei
- Farmers' market
- Fair of the Bürger- und Gewerbeverein (citizens and business association) at the weekend of Whitsun

== Notable citizens ==
- Burkhard, Margrave of Austria (ca. 926–ca. 981), Earl of Geisenhausen
- Henry I (bishop of Augsburg) (died 14 July 982 Battle of Stilo), Earl of Geisenhausen
- Günter Eich (1907–1972), writer
- Martin Flörchinger (1909–2004), actor
- Thomas Schmid (writer) (1960), writer
- Johannes Schmid (1973), stage director
