= Aldersbach =

- Municipality
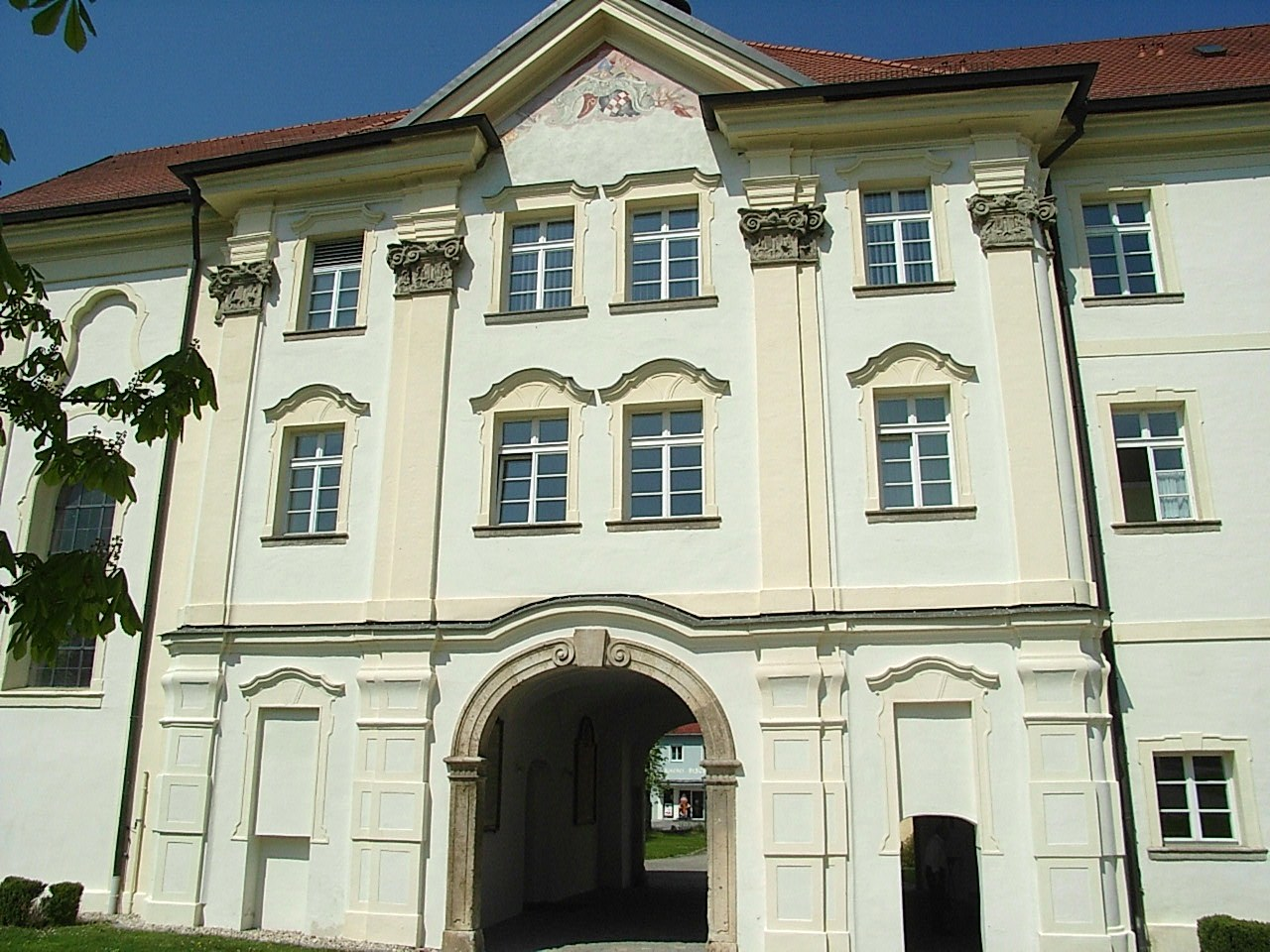
- Town hall

- Coat of arms

- Location of Aldersbach within Passau district
- Interactive map of Aldersbach
- Location within Germany Location within Bavaria
- Coordinates: 48°35′17″N 13°5′8″E
- Country: Germany
- State: Bavaria
- Admin. region: Niederbayern
- District: Passau

Government
  - Mayor (2020–26): Harald Mayrhofer (CSU)

Area
  - Total: 45.82 km^{2} (17.69 sq mi)
- Elevation: 328 m (1,076 ft)

Population (2025-12-31)
  - Total: 4,278
  - Density: 93.37/km^{2} (241.8/sq mi)
- Time zone: UTC+01:00 (CET)
  - Summer (DST): UTC+02:00 (CEST)
- Postal codes: 94501
- Dialling codes: 08543
- Vehicle registration: PA
- Website: www.aldersbach.de

Aldersbach (Central Bavarian: Oidaschbo) is a municipality in the district of Passau in Bavaria in Germany. The former Cistercian Aldersbach Abbey, of which the Baroque church remains, is located in the village. There is also a brewery with museum. Aldersbach has around 4,500 inhabitants.

== Geography ==
=== Geographic setting ===
Aldersbach is located in the Donau-Wald region in the Vils valley, some ten kilometers south west of Vilshofen an der Donau, 30 km west of Passau, 25 km north of Pfarrkirchen and 15 km south of Osterhofen. A stream, the Aldersbach (Bach = stream), flows through the town. Not least in the context of tourism, the region bounded by Aldersbach and Fürstenzell is often referred to as Klosterwinkel (Abbey Corner).

=== Structure ===
The community of Aldersbach is made up of 52 parishes:

- Adenberg
- Aldersbach
- Am Käserberg
- Ammerreuth
- Atzenberg
- Beiglöd
- Duschlöd
- Eck
- Edelsbrunn
- Eggerting
- Freundorf
- Gainstorf
- Galgenberg
- Grüneröd
- Gumperting
- Haag
- Haidach
- Haideck
- Haidenburg
- Harreröd
- Heinrichsdorf
- Hiendlöd
- Hinteröd
- Hirt
- Holzhausen
- Holzhäuser
- Hütter
- Karglöd
- Kramersepp
- Kriestorf
- Maierhof
- Meiering
- Moos
- Neustift
- Niederöd
- Ölat
- Pörndorf
- Reit
- Reuth
- Röslöd
- Sankt Peter
- Schwaig
- Schwarzholz
- Seier
- Stocköd
- Uttigkofen
- Vogler
- Walchsing
- Weidfeld
- Weng
- Wetzstein
- Wifling

These are assigned to the Gemarkungen (sub-districts) of Pörndorf, Walchsing, Aldersbach and Haidenburg.

=== Neighboring towns and villages (district in parentheses) ===
- Johanniskirchen (Landkreis Rottal-Inn)
- Roßbach (Landkreis Rottal-Inn)
- Osterhofen (Landkreis Deggendorf)
- Künzing (Landkreis Deggendorf)
- Vilshofen an der Donau (Landkreis Passau)
- Aidenbach (Landkreis Passau)

== History ==
=== Up to and including the official establishment of the town in 1818 ===
A settlement called Aldarespah is first mentioned in the mid-8th century in a codex belonging to Mondsee Abbey. The ostensible earliest mention of a church in Aldersbach dating from this period resulted from the misinterpretation of note from the early 14th century to be found in the earliest book of accounts of Aldersbach Abbey. 1120 saw the establishment of the first abbey in Aldersbach (St. Peter), founded by the religious order of the Augustinian Canons. By c. 1140 the name Alderbach was in common use and a Latinized form, Adalogeriopagus, appears in records from the early 16th century. The name derives from the name of a person, Althar or Aldar and the Old High German word for a stream: pah or pach. Aldersbach fell under the financial stewardship of Landshut and the jurisdiction of Vilshofen district court in the Electorate of Bavaria. Aldersbach Abbey had its own limited jurisdiction as a Hofmark, before being suppressed in 1803 during the secularization of Bavaria. In 1806 the local Weng and Bernhardsberg churches were sold and demolished. The community of Aldersbach was created by the Community Edict of 1818 in the course of administrative reforms in Bavaria.

=== Administrative community ===
Enforced membership of the administrative community of Aidenbach was lifted in 1980.

=== History of the parishes ===
The parish of Walchsing is first mentioned in records in 1100. Haidenburg hosted a manor house that originally belonged to the House of Harbach, had been acquired by Aldersbach Abbey in 1737 and following secularization in 1818 was purchased by Johann Adam Freiherr von Aretin in 1811. As part of administrative reforms in Bavaria, the Community Edict of 1818 led to the formation of the parishes of Pörndorf, Haidenburg and Walchsing, which were incorporated into Aldersbach in 1972.

=== Incorporation ===
The previously separate community of Walchsing and parts of the dissolved community of Haidenburg were incorporated on January 1, 1972, while Pörndorf (District of Eggenfelden) was incorporated on July 1, 1972.

=== Population trends ===
- 1961: 3304 inhabitants
- 1970: 3210 inhabitants
- 1987: 3574 inhabitants
- 1991: 3801 inhabitants
- 1995: 3885 inhabitants
- 2000: 4018 inhabitants
- 2005: 4310 inhabitants
- 2010: 4300 inhabitants
- 2015: 4224 inhabitants

== Politics ==
=== Town council ===
Since the local elections of March 16, 2014, the town council has been made up as follows:

- CSU: 8 seats (49.36% of the votes)
- SPD-PWG: 2 seats (11.50% of the votes)
- Grüne und Parteifreie: 3 seats (17.16% of the votes)
- FWG: 3 seats (21.98% of the votes)

=== Mayor ===
The mayor is Harald Mayrhofer (CSU/Überparteiliche Wählergem.).

Political stability is a hallmark of Aldersbach, reflected in the fact that between 1946 and 2014 the town had only three mayors: From 1946 to 1966 Alfons Duschl held office, followed by Josef Kiermeier until 1990. From 1990 to 2014 Franz Schwarz was mayor. In the local elections of March 16, 2014, Harald Mayrhofer was elected for a 6-year term.

== Monuments ==
- Pfarrkirche St. Michael in Walchsing

== Economy and infrastructure ==
=== The business community including agriculture and forestry ===
In 1998 there were 44 employees subject to social security contributions in the agriculture and forestry sector, 891 in manufacturing and 104 in the trade and transportation sector in Aldersbach as a place of business. 113 persons subject to social security contributions were employed in other fields of business. 1,243 persons subject to social security contributions were registered as residing in Aldersbach. There were five companies in manufacturing, including mining and quarrying, and six in the construction sector. Furthermore, in 1999 there were 115 farms with 3,194 hectares of agricultural land. Of these, 2,823 ha were arable land and 351 ha permanent pasture. The largest employer in Aldersbach is the Knorr-Bremse SfN GmbH production plant with almost 1,000 employees. Another large employer is Aldersbach brewery.

=== Education ===
Aldersbach has the following educational institutions:

- Two child daycare centers: St. Maria, St. Wolfgang
- Wolfgang-Marius primary school with around 15 teachers and 244 pupils

== Famous sons and daughters of Aldersbach ==
- Heinrich von Aretin (1875–1943), landowner and member of the Reichstag (parliament)
- Franz Xaver Eggersdorfer (1879–1958), Catholic theologian and pedagogue
- Fred Arbinger (* 1957), soccer player and coach

== Literature ==
- Lübbers, Bernhard, Art. Aldersbach, in: Hans-Michael Körner/ Alois Schmid (Hrsg.): Handbuch der historischen Stätten, Bayern I: Altbayern und Schwaben (Kröners Taschenausgabe 324) Stuttgart 2006, S. 10–11.
