= Zeilarn =

- Municipality
- Coat of arms

- Location of Zeilarn within Rottal-Inn district
- Interactive map of Zeilarn
- Location within Germany Location within Bavaria
- Coordinates: 48°18′N 12°50′E
- Country: Germany
- State: Bavaria
- Admin. region: Niederbayern
- District: Rottal-Inn

Government
  - Mayor (2020–26): Werner Lechl

Area
  - Total: 28.9 km^{2} (11.2 sq mi)
- Elevation: 399–506 m (1,309–1,660 ft)

Population (2025-12-31)
  - Total: 2,121
  - Density: 73.4/km^{2} (190/sq mi)
- Time zone: UTC+01:00 (CET)
  - Summer (DST): UTC+02:00 (CEST)
- Postal codes: 84367
- Dialling codes: 08572
- Vehicle registration: PAN, EG
- Website: www.zeilarn.de

Zeilarn (German pronunciation: [ˈtsaɪlaʁn]) is a municipality in the district of Rottal-Inn in Bavaria, Germany.

== Geography ==
=== Geographical position ===
Zeilarn is located in the region Landshut in a characteristic Lower Bavarian landscape of hills directly along the B20 about 14 km southeast of Eggenfelden, 18 km northeast of Altötting, 20 km north of Burghausen, 17 km northwest of Simbach and 20 km southwest of the county town Pfarrkirchen. The nearest train station is situated in Marktl.

=== Municipal structure ===
The civil parish Zeilarn has 87 officially named districts:

- Aiching
- Babing
- Baumgarten
- Berg
- Berger
- Berghäusl
- Bildsberg
- Binderhäusl
- Brandstetten
- Breitreit
- Dambach
- Dofler
- Dornlehen
- Eben
- Edstall
- Enghasling
- Feichting
- Fingerer
- Fixing
- Frieding
- Gasteig
- Gehersdorf
- Gitzelhub
- Gitzelmühle
- Griesmühle
- Grillenhögl
- Großstraß
- Grub
- Grubwies
- Gumpersdorf
- Haid
- Hasling
- Haus
- Hempelsberg
- Hinterau
- Hochwimm
- Höllgrub
- Holzleithen
- Kagerwies
- Kellndorf
- Kleinstraß
- Knogler
- Kochsöd
- Kohlöd
- Königsöd
- Köpfing
- Kreimel
- Lanhofen
- Lederschmid
- Lehen
- Lueg
- Maisthub
- Mannersdorf
- Narrenham
- Oberlehen
- Oberndorf
- Obertürken
- Ofenschwarz
- Passelsberg
- Pirach
- Plöcking
- Prehof
- Rupprechtsaign
- Schallhub
- Schatzlöd
- Schildthurn
- Schmiding
- Schreding
- Schwertfelln
- Sonnertsham
- Speckhaus
- Stockwimm
- Straß
- Thalreuth
- Thannenthal
- Thurnöd
- Vorderau
- Waldmann
- Walln
- Wetzl
- Wiesmühle
- Wiesmühle am Türkenbach
- Wimmhäusl
- Wolfgrub
- Zantlbauer
- Zauner am Högl
- Zeilarn

== History ==
The first time Zeilarn was mentioned in a document was in 788 as Cidlar in the index of the archdiocese Salzburg. Later the village belonged to the county Leonberg, after its extinction in 1319 the counts of Hals inherited the properties. Until the administrative reform in Bavaria in 1818 Zeilarn belonged to the revenue office Landshut and the district court Eggenfelden. Afterwards the boroughs Obertürken, Gumpersdorf and Schildthurn emerged.

=== Incorporations ===
Today's Zeilarn is the result of the consolidation under the local government reorganization in Bavaria in 1971.

=== Assignments ===
In 1980 an area with a little less than 100 inhabitants was assigned to Tann.

=== Population development ===
- 1961: 1897 inhabitants
- 1970: 2071 inhabitants
- 1987: 2053 inhabitants
- 1994: 2218 inhabitants
- 2000: 2221 inhabitants
- 2011: 2174 inhabitants
- 2012: 2131 inhabitants
- 2013: 2117 inhabitants

== Politics ==
Werner Lechl is the mayor, first elected in 2014, and re-elected in 2020.

Tax receipts in 1999 amounted to €1,034,000, thereof the business tax revenues (net) amounted to €390,000.

== Economy and infrastructure ==
=== Economy, agriculture and forestry ===
Going by official statistics there were 243 employees subject to social insurance contributions in manufacturing industries and none in retail businesses. In other economic sectors there were 46 employees subject to social insurance contributions. There was a total of 672 employees subject to social insurance contributions. There were no companies in the manufacturing sector and four in the main construction trades. In addition there were 115 agricultural holdings with a total area of 1,601 ha, thereof 914 ha fields and 682 ha permanent grassland.

=== Bildung ===
There are the following facilities:

- kindergarten: 50 places
- elementary school: 74 pupils

== Sights ==
- The late Gothic parish church St. Martin was expanded in 1888. It has late Gothic furnishings with some Gothic and Baroque figures and tombstones.
