= Mitterskirchen =

- Municipality
- Coat of arms

- Location of Mitterskirchen within Rottal-Inn district
- Interactive map of Mitterskirchen
- Location within Germany Location within Bavaria
- Coordinates: 48°21′N 12°44′E
- Country: Germany
- State: Bavaria
- Admin. region: Niederbayern
- District: Rottal-Inn

Government
  - Mayor (2020–26): Christian Müllinger

Area
  - Total: 24.63 km^{2} (9.51 sq mi)
- Elevation: 433 m (1,421 ft)

Population (2025-12-31)
  - Total: 2,196
  - Density: 89.16/km^{2} (230.9/sq mi)
- Time zone: UTC+01:00 (CET)
  - Summer (DST): UTC+02:00 (CEST)
- Postal codes: 84335
- Dialling codes: 08725
- Vehicle registration: PAN, EG
- Website: www.mitterskirchen.de

Mitterskirchen (German pronunciation: [mɪtɐsˈkɪʁçn̩]) is a municipality in the district of Rottal-Inn in Bavaria in Germany.

== Geography ==
Mitterskirchen is situated in a small side-valley of the Rott, bordering on the district of Oberbayern (upper Bavaria). Mitterskirchen is at the federal highway B588, about seven kilometers south-west of Eggenfelden, 18 kilometers north of Altötting, 23 kilometers north-east of Mühldorf, as well as 22 kilometers south-west of the district capital Pfarrkirchen. The next train station on the railway line Passau - Mühldorf is in Eggenfelden.

== History ==
Mitterskirchen used to belong to the Rentamt Landshut and the Landgericht (court) Eggenfelden of the Electorate Bavaria. The Freiin of Ingenheim, born a von Closen of Gern and Arnstorf, owned an open Hofmark here in 1800. During the administrative reforms in Bavaria, today's municipality was established by the 1818 Gemeindeedikt.

== Development ==
In the municipality, 1.453 inhabitants were counted in 1970, then 1.612 in 1987 and 1.959 in the year 2000. The recent head count in 2007 is 2.068

== Politics ==
The mayor is Christian Müllinger, first elected in 2014 and re-elected in 2020.

Municipal tax revenue in 1999 was about 705.000 Euros, of which about 191.000 Euros were the net business tax revenue.

== Economy and Infrastructure ==
=== Economy as well as Agriculture and forestry ===
In 1998, according to official statistics, there were 6 people employed in agriculture and forestry, 175 in production and 9 in commerce and traffic at this location. In other economic areas, 43 people were employed. There was a total of 661 employees at this place of residence. There were two businesses in the processing sector, six in construction. Furthermore, there were 87 farms in 1999 with an agriculturally-used area of 1,574 acres (6.37 km^{2}) total, of which 998 acres (4.04 km^{2}) were fields and 576 acres (2.33 km^{2}) verdure.

=== Infrastructure ===
An extension of the federal highway from Eggenfelden to Altötting was finished in 2008, passing the village at a further distance now, and cutting through between the village's north-eastern limits and its adjacent neighborhood Leitenbach. The extension was necessary due to the bad condition of the original pieces of street that went through the village and the commuting traffic and heavy trucks.

== Education ==
In 1999:

- Kindergarten: 75 spots with 86 children
- Elementary school: 1 with 18 teachers and 314 students

The school was extended with an additional building in 2004/2005.
