= Schönau, Lower Bavaria =

Schönau
- Municipality
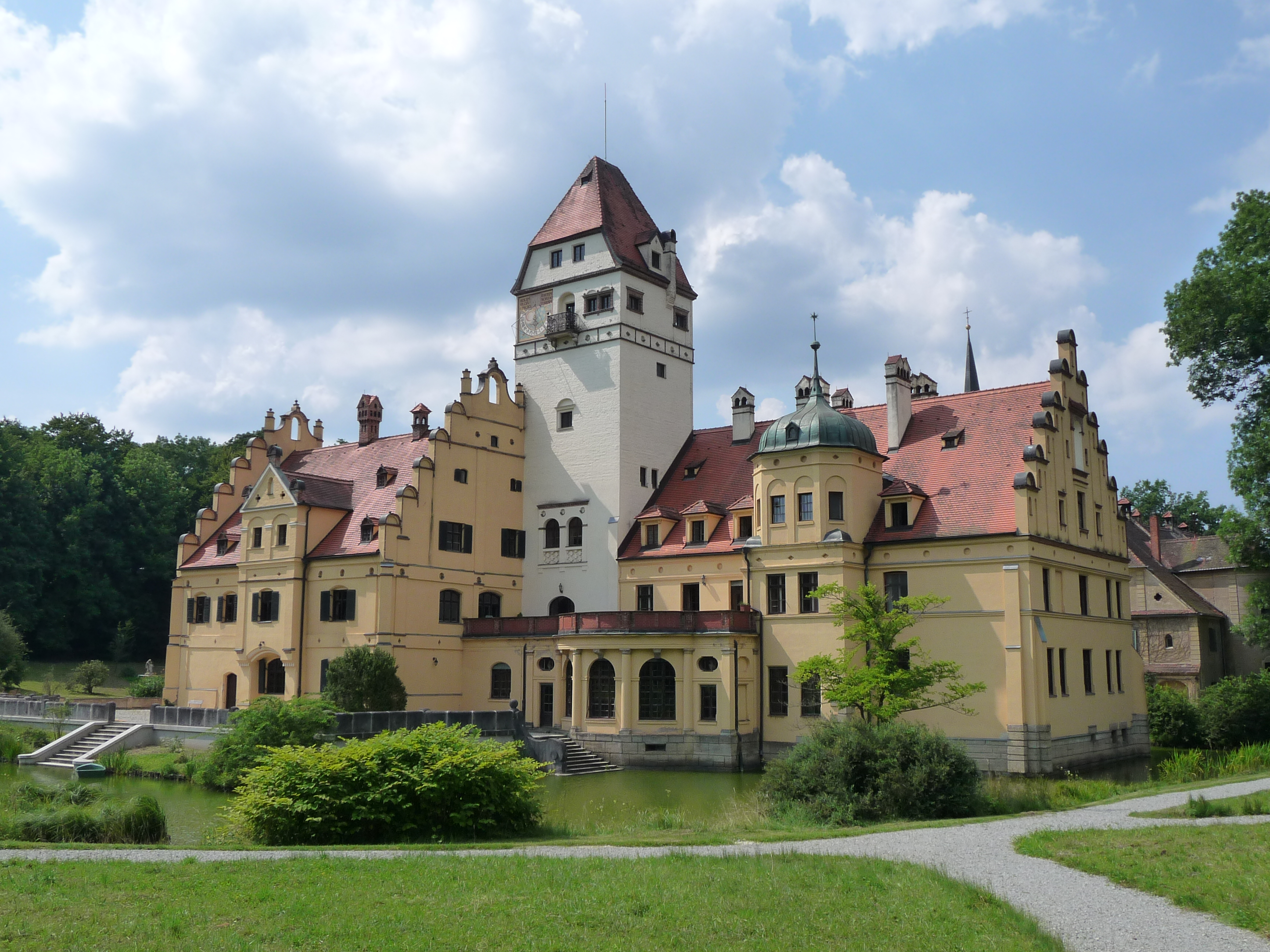
- Castle in Schönau

- Coat of arms

- Location of Schönau within Rottal-Inn district
- Interactive map of Schönau
- Location within Germany Location within Bavaria
- Coordinates: 48°29′N 12°51′E
- Country: Germany
- State: Bavaria
- Admin. region: Niederbayern
- District: Rottal-Inn

Government
  - Mayor (2020–26): Robert Putz

Area
  - Total: 36.14 km^{2} (13.95 sq mi)
- Elevation: 428 m (1,404 ft)

Population (2025-12-31)
  - Total: 1,906
  - Density: 52.74/km^{2} (136.6/sq mi)
- Time zone: UTC+01:00 (CET)
  - Summer (DST): UTC+02:00 (CEST)
- Postal codes: 84337
- Dialling codes: 08726
- Vehicle registration: PAN
- Website: www.gemeinde-schoenau.de

Schönau (German pronunciation: [ˈʃøːnaʊ]) is a municipality in the district of Rottal-Inn in Bavaria, Germany. It is part of the Landshut planning region and is administrative region of Lower Bavaria. Geographically, the municipality is located in the rolling hills of the Unterrottal in the western part of the district. Schönau is known beyond the region for the Schönau Moated Castle and its historic castle park.

== Geography ==
The municipality is located in the Landshut planning region, nestled quietly within the typical Lower Bavarian rolling hills. Schönau is situated approximately 11 km northwest of the district capital Pfarrkirchen, 10 km northeast of Eggenfelden, 30 km south of Landau, and 35 km southwest of Vilshofen.

The regional border with the region of Upper Bavaria runs just a few kilometers south of the municipality. Within the wider regional area, Schönau is located 60 km east of Landshut, 65 km west of Passau, and about 40 km north of the cities of Burghausen and Braunau am Inn (Austria). In the broader surrounding area are the Lower Bavarian city of Straubing (70 km north), the Austrian fortress city of Salzburg (85 km south), the UNESCO World Heritage city of Regensburg (105 km northwest), and the state capital Munich (120 km southwest).

The nearest railway station is the Hebertsfelden stop, located 10 km away on the Passau–Neumarkt-Sankt Veit railway line.
