= Gangkofen =

- Municipality
- Coat of arms

- Location of Gangkofen within Rottal-Inn district
- Interactive map of Gangkofen
- Location within Germany Location within Bavaria
- Coordinates: 48°26′13″N 12°33′48″E
- Country: Germany
- State: Bavaria
- Admin. region: Niederbayern
- District: Rottal-Inn
- Subdivisions: 9 Ortsteile

Government
  - Mayor (2020–26): Matthäus Mandl (CSU)

Area
  - Total: 108.79 km^{2} (42.00 sq mi)
- Elevation: 439 m (1,440 ft)

Population (2025-12-31)
  - Total: 6,119
  - Density: 56.25/km^{2} (145.7/sq mi)
- Time zone: UTC+01:00 (CET)
  - Summer (DST): UTC+02:00 (CEST)
- Postal codes: 84140
- Dialling codes: 08722 08735 (Kollbach)
- Vehicle registration: PAN
- Website: www.gangkofen.de

Gangkofen is a municipality in the county ("Landkreis") of Rottal-Inn in Bavaria in Germany.

== Geography ==
The market town (Markt) Gangkofen lies in the valley of the river Bina along the federal highway B 388 about 17 km (11 mi) west of Eggenfelden, 26 km (16 mi) south of Dingolfing, 40 km (25 mi) southeast of Landshut, 25 km (16 mi) north of Mühldorf and 32 km (20 mi) west of the county (district) seat, Pfarrkirchen.

Gangkofen is the westernmost municipality of the rural county or district ("Landkreis") named Rottal-Inn, and borders the county of Dingolfing-Landau in the north, the county of Mühldorf in the south and the county of Landshut in the west. Gangkofen is considered part of the historic and geographic Rottal region, because the market town was part of the former county of Eggenfelden (in the Rott valley) and has stronger economic and cultural ties to the east, than in other directions. The western portions of the political municipality - the former rural towns of Dirnaich and Hölsbrunn- historically belonged to the county of Vilsbiburg (now part of the county of Landshut), thus the inhabitants of those parts tend to look to be oriented in that direction (the west) even today.

The political municipality comprises the market town itself and the following villages: Angerbach, Dirnaich, Engersdorf, Hölsbrunn, Kollbach, Malling, Obertrennbach, Panzing, Radlkofen, Reicheneibach und Seemannshausen.

== History ==
Gangkofen is first mentioned in a document in 889 AD. The town is believed to have been part of the properties the Diocese of Bamberg was equipped with upon its foundation in 1007 AD. In 1279 Count Wenhard II. of Leonberg made the Teutonic Knights the patrons over the local parish, thus founding this military order's monastic residence ("Kommende") in Gangkofen. Up to its secularization in 1805/06 this was the only branch of the Teutonic Knights in Lower Bavaria.

In 1379 Gangkofen was awarded the title and privileges of a market town. Its coat of arms was awarded by Duke Ludwig IX. of Bavaria-Landshut around 1450. However, Gangkofen's development was repeatedly thwarted by devastating fires (e.g. around 1590 and in the year 1666) and the trials of war (during the 30 Years' War it was occupied by the Swedes in 1632 and 1648), as well as outbreaks of the plague (1357 and 1649).

The market town Gangkofen was a separate lower administrative and judicial unit ("Pflegamt") prior to 1803 and was part of the tax district ("Rentamt") Landshut of the Prince-Electoriate Bavaria. The residence of the Teutonic Knights ("Kommende"), which was equipped with the liberties of a gentry seat ("Hofmarksrecht") and exercised the judicial stewardship over its own properties, was dissolved by the Kingdom of Bavaria in 1806. Additionally, Gangkofen was seat of a market court. In the process of administrative reforms in Bavaria, the municipality edict ("Gemeindeedikt") of 1818 and the territory reforms of the 1970s established the contemporary municipality.

On October 15, 1875, Gangkofen was linked to the railroad system with the completion of the rail line Mühldorf–Pilsting. Since September 27, 1970 this connection has only been used for freight traffic.

== Population growth ==
Between 1988 and 2018 the municipality's population increased from 6032 to 6432 (+6.6%).

== Politics ==
Municipal council

The most recent municipal elections in 2020 had a voter turn-out of 57.4% and resulted in the following allocation of seats (percent of total vote shown in parentheses):

- CSU 8 (40.5%)
- FWG (Free Voters) 5 (26.0%)
- SPD 2 (8.3%)
- Bavaria Party 3 (14.1%)
- Voters' Community Kollbach 2 (11.2%)

Matthäus Mandl (CSU) is the current mayor of Gangkofen, and has been in office since 2008. He was re-elected with 91.1% of the votes in 2020.

== Cultural sights ==
The 0,6 hectare(1.5 acres) market place, located in the center of town, is 18 m (59 ft) wide and 210 m (689 ft) long, approximating the typical ratio of 1:8. Many of the houses still have the typical arched gables. The Catholic parish church was rebuilt after the great fire of 1666, completed by 1670, and the steeple added 1695 to 1697. Immediately to the northwest of the Church lies the former monastery of the Teutonic Knights, a three winged structure, newly built in 1691 in the late baroque style.

== Media ==
Two local newspapers are circulated in Gangkofen: The "Rottaler Anzeiger" (regional edition of the Passauer Neue Presse, PNP) has its editorial office in Eggenfelden, 11 miles (18 km) to the east. The Vilsbiburger Zeitung (belonging to the media group Landshuter Zeitung/Straubinger Tagblatt) is from Vilsbiburg, 11 miles (18 km) to the west. For years, an occasional competitive struggle for the patronage of the citizens of this community erupted between the two papers, but now the spoils seem divided and peace prevails.

== People ==
Famous sons and daughters of the town:

- Ottmar Edenhofer (* 8. Juli 1961), Chief economist at the Potsdam Institute for Climate Impact Research
- Rudolf Ratzinger (* 3. Juni 1966), Musician, founded the audioproject Wumpscut

People who have lived and worked in Gangkofen:

- Franz Seraph Reicheneder (1905–1976), Historian, was a Roman Catholic Chaplain at Gangkofen parish from 1933 to 1936 .
