= Peter Griesbacher =

German composer (1864–1933)

- Born: 25 March 1864; Egglham, Kingdom of Bavaria
- Died: 28 January 1933 (aged 68); Regensburg, Bavaria, Germany
- Occupations: Composer; organist; bell expert
- Years active: 1880s–1933
- Era: Romantic
- Style: Classical; liturgical
- Movement: Cecilian Movement

Peter Griesbacher (25 March 1864 – 28 January 1933) was a German classical composer, organist, and bell expert.

== Life ==
Griesbacher was born in Egglham. He studied in Passau and was ordained a priest in 1886. From 1894 to 1895, he was music prefect at the Studienseminar (study seminary) St. Emmeram in Regensburg. Due to his reputation as a church composer, he was appointed in 1911 a lecturer at the Kirchenmusikschule Regensburg (School of Church Music) of Regensburg, where he taught counterpoint, musical form, and stylistics. Around the same time, he was appointed vicar and then canon at the Collegiate St. Johann in Regensburg. In 1930, the chapter elected him dean. He was temporarily director until Carl Thiel succeeded Karl Weinberger.

He died in Regensburg of gastrointestinal cancer.

== Work ==
Griesbacher composed predominantly Catholic church music. Based on the a cappella of the Cecilian Movement, he wrote works accompanied by the organ. When the orchestra was added, he did not do the instrumentation himself. He tried to combine the strict Cecilian style with late romantic harmonies. His later works are characterised by a rather complex musical language. Griesbacher played a role in the transition of Catholic church music from the 19th to the 20th century. He created about 250 works, including 49 masses.
