= 2016 United Kingdom floods =

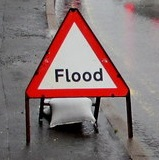
- Date: 7 June 2016 – 23 June 2016
- Location: United Kingdom

In June 2016, parts of the United Kingdom were struck by serious flash floods. Starting on 7 June, thunderstorms caused intense rainfall in many locations across the country, particularly in the north of England and in London, causing repeated flash floods in several locations on a daily basis.

The flooding in the United Kingdom followed further flooding on the European mainland throughout May and June 2016, although the two events were caused by different weather systems.

== Timeline of events ==
=== 5 June ===
Approximately 90 minutes of torrential rainfall from 18:30 led to flash flooding across Southport and Birkdale in Merseyside. This resulted in several properties being flooded internally and widespread flooding of the highway.

=== 7 June ===
Strong thunderstorms spawned by unusually warm weather caused heavy rainfall and flash flooding across the south of England, particularly in London, where 35 mm (1.4 inches) of rain was recorded in one hour, over two-thirds of the local average monthly rainfall total for June. The south-east London suburbs of Mitcham, Croydon and Wallington were worst affected, with floodwater up to two metres (6.6 ft) deep recorded on roads in Wallington. The London Fire Brigade received over 100 emergency calls and attended to three incidents of cars being swept away by floods, rescuing one person.

Flooding also led to a loss of electrical power at Luton Airport. In Penicuik in Scotland, a primary school and a leisure centre were flooded as well as numerous homes, with severe hail also being reported. Flash floods were also reported in Dunstable town centre and other areas in Bedfordshire, as well as parts of West Yorkshire.

=== 8 June ===
In London, Covent Garden tube station was flooded, with adverse weather forcing the closure of a platform at London Victoria station, while several bus routes were diverted due to flooded roads. Islington, Clapham and Battersea were the worst affected areas.

Severe flooding was also reported across the West Midlands, particularly in Wolverhampton. West Midlands Metro services were suspended due to flooding in Wednesbury, while flooding at Tame Bridge Parkway forced the suspension of National Rail services between Walsall and Rugeley Trent Valley and flooding between Rowley Regis and Old Hill forced the suspension of services between Birmingham Snow Hill and Stourbridge Junction. Additionally, both the M5 and A38 roads suffered disruption due to flooding.

Greater Manchester was also affected by flooding, particularly in the towns of Oldham, Rochdale and Castleton just after 25 minutes of reported rain. In Middleton, rising floodwaters forced people to abandon their cars, while Middleton Shopping Centre was closed after water began to enter the entrance halls and some shops. Flooding was also reported at Middleton Arena and along the Broadway in Chadderton. The Manchester Arndale was reported flooded as well.

Flash flooding in Windsor forced the evacuation of the Theatre Royal during an opening night performance after water began to enter the auditorium. Flooding was also reported in Sheffield, in Stoke-on-Trent, and in parts of East Sussex.

In Northern Ireland, a lightning strike at a primary school in Lisburn, County Antrim injured three people, including two critically.

9 June

=== 10 June ===
Further thunderstorms on 10 June lead to flash flooding mainly across northern England and the Midlands. Severe flooding was reported in parts of South Yorkshire, with Barnsley the worst affected area. in Staincross, numerous cars and a Stagecoach Yorkshire bus became stranded by rising floodwater, while several residential streets were hit by flash flooding in both Staincross and Grimethorpe, affecting dozens of homes. There were also reports of floodwater being contaminated with raw sewage in several areas, with houses being evacuated as they became contaminated. in Darton, floodwater several feet deep blocked roads around Darton railway station, particularly underneath the railway bridge. Flooding was also reported in Honeywell, Hoyland, Darfield, Birdwell and Worsbrough. There were also reports of flooding in Sheffield, particularly in the north-west of the city. A burst manhole cover caused the entirety of the dual carriageway A61 Penistone Road close to Hillsborough Stadium to become flooded with over a foot of water.

In Nottinghamshire, thirty minutes of intense rainfall led to severe standing water flooding in West Bridgford and Long Eaton, while in Gedling, the Ouse Dyke broke its banks and flooded homes. Flooding also affected settlements across the border in Leicestershire, with heavy rainfall flooding businesses on the High Street in the centre of the village of Syston.

Flooding was also reported in parts of Merseyside and Cheshire, including at Cheshire Oaks Designer Outlet and in parts of Liverpool. Emergency services attended a number of flood-related incidents in Ellesmere Port, where flash floods struck the town centre and the suburbs of Little Sutton and Great Sutton, flooding dozens of homes and businesses with water up to a foot deep and forcing evacuations. A local primary school closed early after part of the roof collapsed due to heavy rainfall, and several classrooms were flooded. A sinkhole also opened up on a residential street as a result of the intense rainfall.

In Greater Manchester, parts of Oldham and Rochdale were struck by flash flooding for the second time in three days. Flooding was also reported in parts of Manchester itself. Both the M60 and M62 motorways were flooded, leading to travel disruption. Homes in Ashton under Lyne were flooded with up to a metre of water, and there were also reports of flooding in the Failsworth area of Rochdale.

In the West Midlands, flooding caused disruption in Cannock, including at the Cannock Shopping Centre, which was closed due to flooding in the area. Roads around Cannock railway station were flooded, with two cars becoming stranded.

Minor flooding was also reported at Deeping St Nicholas in Lincolnshire, with five homes affected.

=== 11 June ===
Parts of London were again struck by flash flooding on 11 June. Several feet of water caused flooding in numerous areas, particularly Purley, where cars were left stranded and buses were diverted. Flooding forced the closure of the A23 in south London, causing travel disruption.

In Greater Manchester, flooding was reported in Stockport, Hazel Grove and Offerton, with roads being transformed into rivers. Arriva Rail North train services were suspended between Buxton and Hazel Grove after flooding and landslides affected the Buxton Line railway. Rail replacement buses were provided as a result of the disruption. National Rail later confirmed that the line would remain closed until the end of service on 12 June while urgent repair work was carried out. There were also reports of flooding in Whaley Bridge, with firefighters rescuing one person from their car.

There was further flooding at the Download Festival at Castle Donington, with several feet of water flooding an entire field where hundreds of tents had been set up. Heavy rainfall caused part of the roof of an ASDA supermarket to collapse in Telford as numerous roads were flooded in the town. In Saltney in Cheshire, flooding closed the local High Street as four cars became trapped in floodwater beneath the railway bridge, where there was water several feet deep. There were also reports of floodwater entering several pubs and businesses in Chester.

=== 12 June ===
12 June saw some of the worst flooding to date. There was widespread flooding across Greater Manchester, Merseyside and Cheshire, with dozens of homes affected and many people having to be evacuated to emergency shelters by the fire brigade using boats, particularly in Poynton. There were further landslides on the railway line between Stockport and Disley, forcing it to close again just hours after reopening; it was later confirmed that the line would remain closed until at least 19 June while repair work was carried out.

There was also flooding in parts of Gloucestershire, including at Cheltenham Spa railway station and across residential areas of Cheltenham, with disruption to electricity supplies occurring across the county. In Chelmsford in Essex, several homes were flooded with water up to knee depth.

One person was injured during thunderstorms in Bedfordshire after their home in Flitwick was struck by lightning. The Bedfordshire Fire Brigade received over 40 flood-related emergency calls across the county. In Stotfold and Ampthill, a brook burst its banks and a storm drain failed, leading to severe flooding. Flooding also occurred in Cranfield, Barton-le-Clay, Lower Stondon and Lidlington.

=== 13 June ===
Heavy rainfall at the Cheshire Oaks Designer Outlet caused draining systems to fail, causing flooding inside numerous stores, with the roof of at least one store partially collapsing inside. Flooding was also reported across Lancashire, particularly in Lancaster and Morecambe, with up to four feet of water blocking roads in places. At least one car was left stranded by the flooding, with emergency services being called out to deal with the incident.

In Hertfordshire, flooding was reported in Letchworth Garden City, Stotfold and Hitchin. The outdoor swimming pool in Letchworth overflowed, while several streams burst their banks, and sewage systems were overwhelmed, flooding areas with raw sewage. The Center Parcs at Woburn Forest in Bedfordshire was also flooded, with seven holiday lodges having to be evacuated.

=== 14 June ===
Heavy rainfall caused serious disruption to rail services across the Midlands. Trains were suspended for several hours between Hednesford and Rugeley Trent Valley due to flooding, affecting London Midland services. There was also serious disruption to London Midland and Chiltern Railways services between Birmingham Snow Hill and Stourbridge Junction due to flooding near The Hawthorns.

In Birmingham, the Bullring and Mailbox shopping centres were forced to close due to flooding, which also affected the Grand Central shopping plaza above Birmingham New Street railway station, with water leaking through the roof and flooding the malls. Bus and Midland Metro services were also affected, while the Bull Ring Indoor Market was forced to close. Flooding was also reported in Erdington, where a car overturned. The M5 motorway was flooded between Junctions 1 and 2. A 'major incident' was declared at Heartlands Hospital after flooding struck the accident and emergency department. Flooding was also reported across West Bromwich, including outside The Hawthorns, although the stadium itself appeared unaffected. There was also flooding in parts of Smethwick and areas in nearby Staffordshire.

Further flooding occurred in Shropshire. Several tornadoes touched down close to Shrewsbury, although it remained over rural areas and caused no reported damage. Flooding was reported in Newport, Telford, Lognor, Ketley and Donnington. There were also reports of flooding in north Wales, particularly in Denbighshire and Wrexham; in Greater Manchester; and in Kettering, Northamptonshire.

=== 16 June ===
Flash flooding due to severe thunderstorms once again brought disruption to the West Midlands transport network. Significant flooding at Lye once again caused London Midland and Chiltern Railways services to be delayed and cancelled between Kidderminster and Birmingham Snow Hill, whilst several bus routes were diverted due to flooding, in particular in the area surrounding the Merry Hill shopping centre, where several shops had been forced to shut due to large amounts of water coming through the ceiling and the bus station was also flooded.

=== 23 June ===
Flash flooding particularly affecting London and South East England, caused widespread transport disruption.

== See also ==
- 2016 European floods
- 2015–16 Great Britain and Ireland floods
