= Stubenberg =

Stubenberg may refer to:

== Locations ==
- Stubenberg, Bavaria
- Stubenberg, Styria

== Other ==
- Stubenberg (family)
- Maria Anna Stubenberg (1821-1912), composer
