= 2016 European floods =

Natural disasters

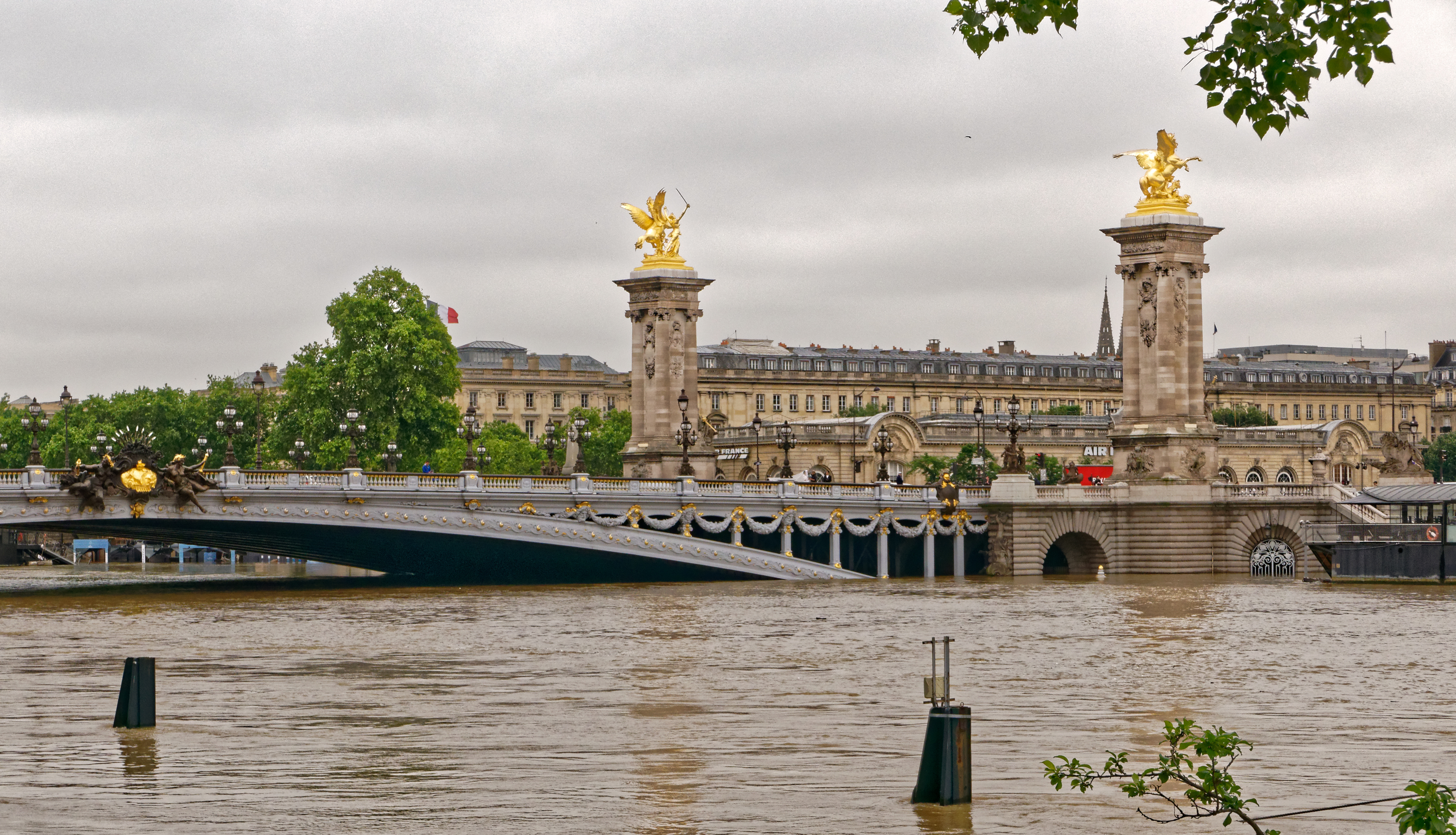
- The Seine in central Paris on 3 June
- Date: May–June 2016
- Location: Austria; Belgium; France; Denmark; Germany; Spain; Moldova; Romania; United Kingdom
- Deaths: 21
- Property damage: € 1 bn+ (Bavaria alone)

Flooding in Saint-Rémy-lès-Chevreuse, Île-de-France

In late May and early June 2016 flooding began after several days of heavy rain in Europe, mostly Germany and France, but also Austria, Belgium, Romania, Moldova, Netherlands and the United Kingdom. Among others, the German states of Bavaria, Hesse, Rhineland-Palatinate, Baden-Württemberg, and North Rhine-Westphalia were affected. Beginning at the river Neckar, the Danube, Rhine, Seine and their tributaries were highly affected by high water and flooding along their banks. At least 21 people died in the floods.

== Flooded countries ==
=== Germany ===
The Baden-Württemberg village of Braunsbach was most heavily affected by the floods. After flash floods on 29 May 2016, small tributaries of the river Kocher flooded the streets of the village within minutes, and the roadways were buried under rocks, trees and car wrecks. While no one was killed in Braunsbach, four people died in Baden-Württemberg alone, three of them in the floods, and a fourth victim, a 13-year-old girl, was killed while seeking shelter from the rain under a railway bridge in Schorndorf, near Stuttgart. Among the dead were a 21-year-old man and a 38-year-old firefighter, who wanted to help the young man and died along with him in a flooded underpass in Schwäbisch Gmünd, engulfed in an open sewer.

At least seven people were killed in Bavaria, where districts established "disaster areas". The towns of Triftern and Simbach on the river Inn faced severe flooding. Three women were found dead in the basement of a flooded house in Simbach, and a drowned woman was found hanging over a tree trunk near the village of Julbach, after her house collapsed.

On 2 June, it was confirmed that a fifth and a sixth person died in Bavaria: two men, aged 75 and 65, were found dead in Simbach. In addition, four people were reported missing. Streets were swept away, bridges destroyed. The small Simbach stream had risen from half a metre to a level of 5 metres within hours. Two people were arrested under allegations of looting. A seventh victim, a 72-year-old man, died in hospital after being rescued from the floods.

On 3 and 4 June, heavy storms were reported in Southern Germany again. Music festivals Rock am Ring and Rock im Park faced serious security concerns and heavy rainfalls. 81 people were injured at Rock am Ring festival, 15 of them seriously, after lightning struck the crowd on the evening of 3 June. Two people had to be resuscitated by paramedics; however, none were in a life-threatening condition. Hundreds left the festival on 4 June, and it was temporarily interrupted for hours after thunderstorms were predicted, but continued in the evening. The festival did not continue on 5 June, because the authorities denied approval. The 90.000 visitors had to leave.

On 4 June there were floods in the region around Bonn on tributaries of the river Rhine. In Polling in Upper Bavaria a "disaster situation" was reported by the authorities, in Lower Bavaria there were more than 140 rescue operations.

Initial estimates of the damage amounted to €1 billion, in Bavaria alone. The flooded area there was twice as large as lake Chiemsee.

=== France ===
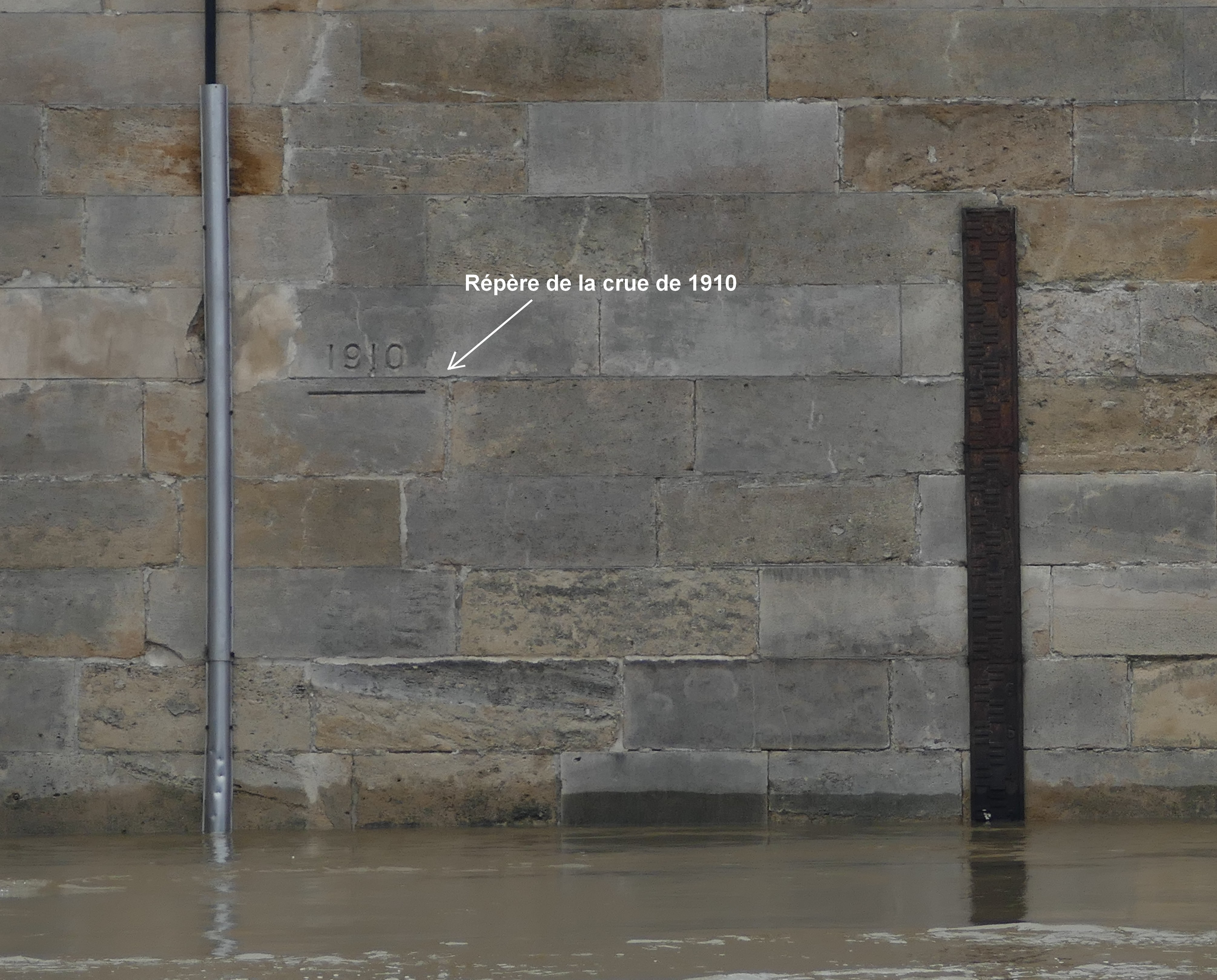
Flood level of the Seine in Paris 2016 against the flood height of 1910

In France, the river Seine burst its banks and one town was evacuated. Four people died in the floods. An 86-year-old woman was found dead in Souppes-sur-Loing, Seine-et-Marne, after her house was flooded. A 74-year-old man on horseback died in Évry-Grégy-sur-Yerre, south of Paris while crossing a flooded field.

Some areas reported the worst flooding seen in a century. In the department of Loiret, six weeks worth of rain reportedly fell in three days. Drivers on a highway had to be rescued by soldiers. In Paris, boat cruises were cancelled. The Louvre museum barred public admission on 2 June to 3 June to preemptively secure the artwork in case of flooding caused by the river Seine. Flooding in Paris was expected to peak at around 6.30 m above normal, higher than 6.18 m high seen in 1982, but below the 1955 flood level of 7.12 m, and the 1910 Paris flood which saw levels at 8.62 m above normal.

In Brittany and Corsica, however, a drought was experienced throughout May.

=== Belgium ===
Flooding in several regions of Belgium occurred in the wake of four days of torrential rain. The flooding claimed at least three lives throughout the country. A 60-year-old man died between Harsin and Hargimont after being swept away by a river in an ill-fated attempt to move his beehives. In Welkenraedt, the body of an 80-year-old woman was found, after the Bayon stream overflooded its banks. The heavy rainfall took the life of an 83-year-old man in the Walloon municipality of Momignies.

=== Romania ===
On Friday, June 3, authorities said that two people have died and 200 people have been evacuated from their homes as floods swept parts of eastern Romania. The interior ministry said 7,000 firefighters, police and others had been dispatched overnight Friday to help in flood rescue efforts. The ministry said in a statement that a man died after a torrent of water knocked him off his bicycle in the eastern village of Ruginești. In Bacău county, in eastern Romania, another man was found drowned.

== Casualties ==
| Country | Dead | Ref. |
|---|---|---|
| Germany | 11 | |
| France | 5 | |
| Belgium | 3 | |
| Romania | 2 | |

== Reactions ==
Bavaria's minister of the Interior, Joachim Herrmann, announced financial aid for those affected. French president Francois Hollande stated that "when there are such severe weather phenomena, we should realise that we must act on the global level". He said he has attended a meeting "so we can be vigilant regarding the rising water level, the peaks which might potentially involve more decisions" and noted that "what is happening now, especially in Paris and in some regions, is exceptional". German chancellor Angela Merkel expressed her condolences to the relatives of the victims.

== Subsequent severe weather events in Europe ==
On the evening on 7 June a tornado accompanied by heavy thunderstorms caused severe damage in north eastern parts of the city of Hamburg. Massive trees were uprooted and roofs were uncovered. There were 254 rescue operations by fire brigades and Technisches Hilfswerk. A state of emergency was temporarily declared for the city. Heavy thunderstorms were reported from the Ruhrgebiet area in Western Germany. Furthermore, a series of tornados was reported from nearby Schleswig-Holstein. Meteorologist Adrian Leyser of Deutscher Wetterdienst called the accumulation of the phenomenons "surprising to some" and a "result of special meteorological conditions".

=== United Kingdom ===
Heavy rainfall has caused a series of flash floods to strike large parts of the United Kingdom since 7 June 2016; however, this was caused by a different weather system than the European flooding.
