= Dietersburg =

- Municipality
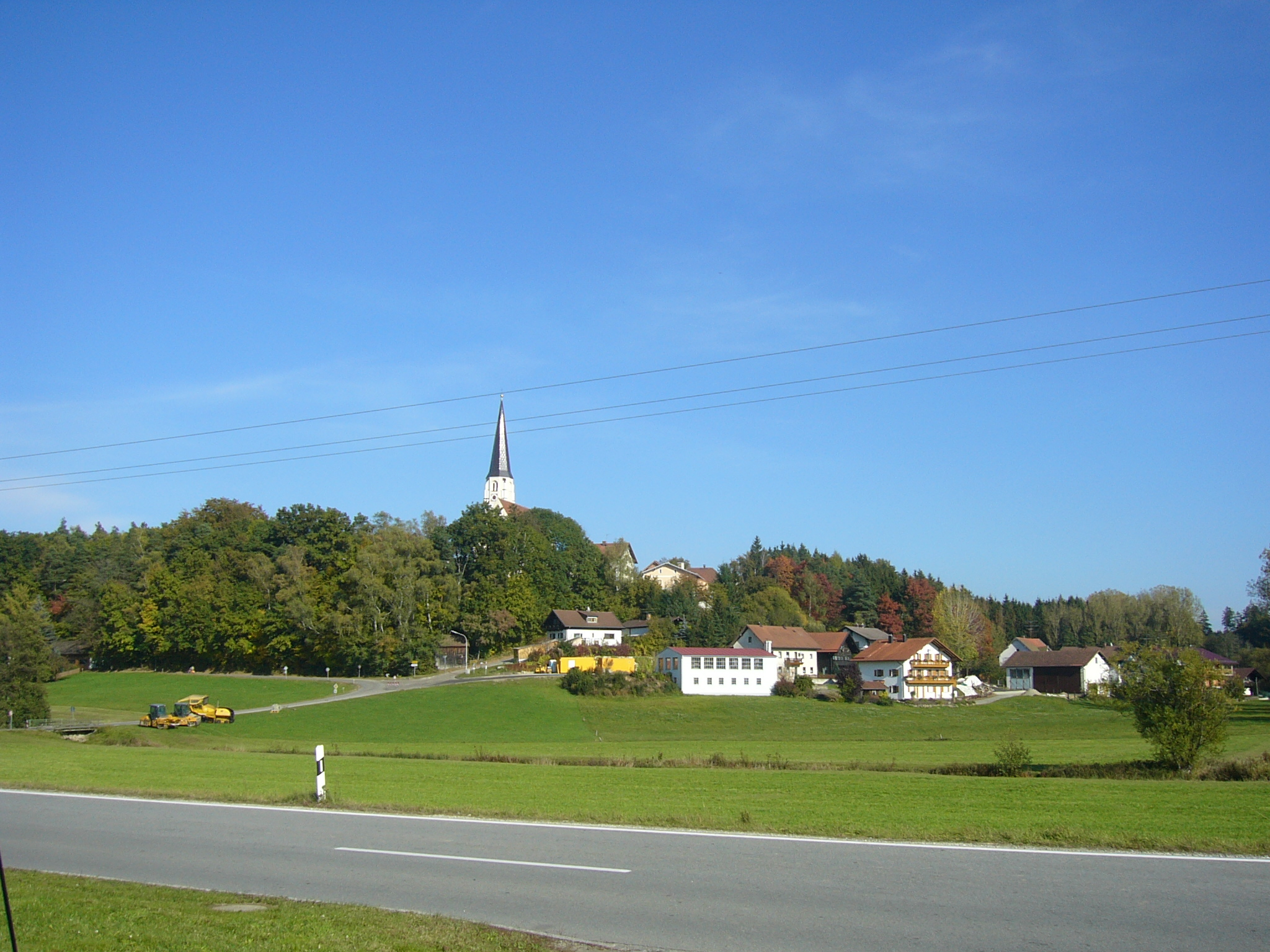

- Coat of arms

- Location of Dietersburg within Rottal-Inn district
- Interactive map of Dietersburg
- Location within Germany Location within Bavaria
- Coordinates: 48°30′N 12°55′E
- Country: Germany
- State: Bavaria
- Admin. region: Niederbayern
- District: Rottal-Inn

Government
  - Mayor (2020–26): Stefan Hanner

Area
  - Total: 55.03 km^{2} (21.25 sq mi)
- Elevation: 427 m (1,401 ft)

Population (2025-12-31)
  - Total: 2,980
  - Density: 54.2/km^{2} (140/sq mi)
- Time zone: UTC+01:00 (CET)
  - Summer (DST): UTC+02:00 (CEST)
- Postal codes: 84378
- Dialling codes: 08564, 08726
- Vehicle registration: PAN
- Website: www.dietersburg.de

Dietersburg (German pronunciation: [ˈdiːtɐsbʊʁk]; Central Bavarian: Diederschburg) is a municipality in the district of Rottal-Inn in Bavaria in Germany.
