= Massing, Germany =

Massing
- Municipality
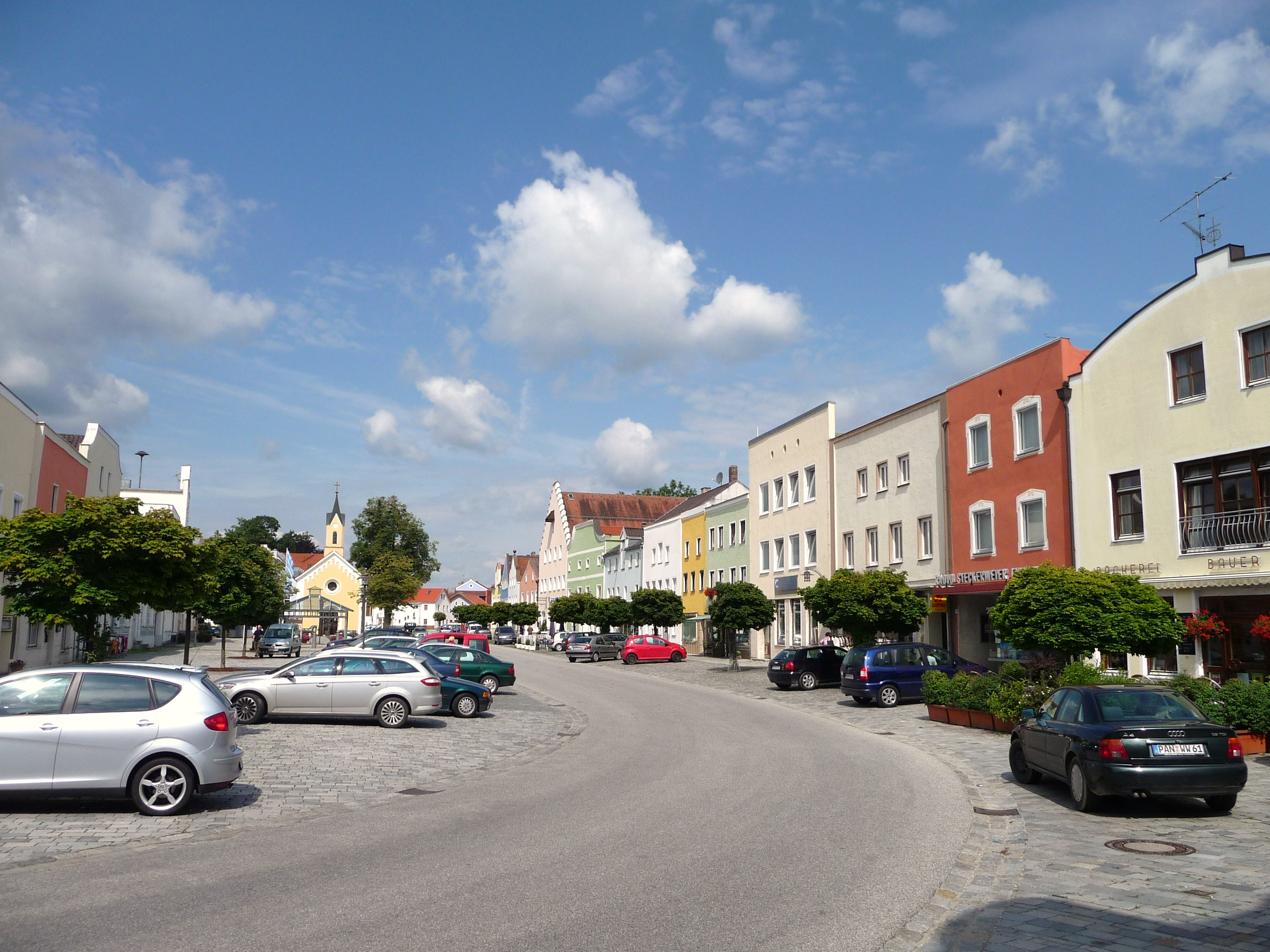
- Market square

- Coat of arms

- Location of Massing within Rottal-Inn district
- Interactive map of Massing
- Location within Germany Location within Bavaria
- Coordinates: 48°24′N 12°45′E
- Country: Germany
- State: Bavaria
- Admin. region: Niederbayern
- District: Rottal-Inn
- Municipal assoc.: Massing

Government
  - Mayor (2020–26): Christian Thiel (SPD)

Area
  - Total: 36.13 km^{2} (13.95 sq mi)
- Elevation: 428 m (1,404 ft)

Population (2025-12-31)
  - Total: 4,027
  - Density: 111.5/km^{2} (288.7/sq mi)
- Time zone: UTC+01:00 (CET)
  - Summer (DST): UTC+02:00 (CEST)
- Postal codes: 84323
- Dialling codes: 08724
- Vehicle registration: PAN
- Website: www.massing.de

Massing (German pronunciation: [ˈmasɪŋ]) is a municipality in the district of Rottal-Inn in Bavaria in Germany.
