= Bayerbach =

- Municipality
- Coat of arms

- Location of Bayerbach within Rottal-Inn district
- Interactive map of Bayerbach
- Location within Germany Location within Bavaria
- Coordinates: 48°25′N 13°9′E
- Country: Germany
- State: Bavaria
- Admin. region: Niederbayern
- District: Rottal-Inn
- Municipal assoc.: Bad Birnbach

Government
  - Mayor (2020–26): Günter Baumgartner

Area
  - Total: 19.43 km^{2} (7.50 sq mi)
- Elevation: 355 m (1,165 ft)

Population (2025-12-31)
  - Total: 1,662
  - Density: 85.54/km^{2} (221.5/sq mi)
- Time zone: UTC+01:00 (CET)
  - Summer (DST): UTC+02:00 (CEST)
- Postal codes: 94137
- Dialling codes: 08532
- Vehicle registration: PAN
- Website: www.bayerbach.de

Bayerbach (German pronunciation: [ˈbaɪɐbax]) is a municipality in the district of Rottal-Inn in Bavaria in Germany.
