= Rottal-Inn =

Coordinates: 48°25′N 12°55′E

- District
- Flag Coat of arms
- Country: Germany
- State: Bavaria
- Adm. region: Lower Bavaria
- Founded: 1972
- Capital: Pfarrkirchen

Government
  - District admin.: Michael Fahmüller (CSU)

Area
  - Total: 1,280 km^{2} (490 sq mi)

Population (31 December 2025)
  - Total: 120,638
  - Density: 94.2/km^{2} (244/sq mi)
- Time zone: UTC+01:00 (CET)
  - Summer (DST): UTC+02:00 (CEST)
- Vehicle registration: PAN, EG, VIB, GRI
- Website: http://www.rottal-inn.de

Rottal-Inn is a Landkreis (district) in the southeastern part of Bavaria, Germany. Neighboring districts are (from the south clockwise) Altötting, Mühldorf, Landshut, Dingolfing-Landau and Passau. To the southeast is the Austrian state of Upper Austria (Braunau).

== Geography ==
The main rivers in the district are the Inn and its tributary, the Rott.

== History ==
The district was created in 1972 by merging the two previous districts of Pfarrkirchen and Eggenfelden and parts of the districts Griesbach and Vilsbiburg.

== Coat of arms ==
The coat of arms combines the symbols of the two previous districts. Dexter in chief is a panther as the symbol of Eggenfelden, derived from the coat of arms of the Counts of Spanheim, who ruled the area until the 13th century. Sinister in base a horse as the symbol of Pfarrkirchen, as the area is famous for the horse-breeding tradition. The bendlet sinister Azure between them symbolizes the two rivers in the district, the Inn and the Rott.

== Towns and municipalities ==
Clickable map of towns and municipalities in the district

Towns
Municipalities
1. Eggenfelden
2. Pfarrkirchen
3. Simbach am Inn

Markt (market towns)

1. Arnstorf
2. Gangkofen
3. Triftern
4. Wurmannsquick
1. Dietersburg
2. Egglham
3. Hebertsfelden
4. Johanniskirchen
5. Julbach
6. Kirchdorf am Inn
7. Mitterskirchen
8. Postmünster
9. Roßbach
10. Schönau
11. Unterdietfurt
12. Wittibreut
13. Zeilarn

Verwaltungsgemeinschaften
1. Bad Birnbach; 1. Bad Birnbach^{1,2}; 2. Bayerbach	2. Ering; 1. Ering^{1}; 2. Stubenberg	3. Falkenberg; 1. Falkenberg^{1}; 2. Malgersdorf; 3. Rimbach	4. Massing; 1. Geratskirchen; 2. Massing^{1,2}	5. Tann; 1. Reut; 2. Tann^{1,2}
^{1}seat of the Verwaltungsgemeinschaft; ^{2}Markt
