= Massing (Verwaltungsgemeinschaft) =

- Verwaltungsgemeinschaft
- Location of Massing within Rottal-Inn district
- Interactive map of Massing
- Location within Germany Location within Bavaria
- Coordinates: 48°24′N 12°36′E
- Country: Germany
- State: Bavaria
- Admin. region: Lower Bavaria
- District: Rottal-Inn
- Seat: Massing
- Subdivisions: 2 municipalities

Area
  - Total: 49.03 km^{2} (18.93 sq mi)

Population (2025-12-31)
  - Total: 4,883
  - Density: 99.59/km^{2} (257.9/sq mi)
- Time zone: UTC+01:00 (CET)
  - Summer (DST): UTC+02:00 (CEST)
- Website: www.massing.de

Massing is a Verwaltungsgemeinschaft (municipal association) in the district Rottal-Inn in Bavaria, Germany. Its seat is in Massing.

It consists of the following municipalities:

1. Geratskirchen
2. Massing
