= Reut =

- Municipality
- Coat of arms

- Location of Reut within Rottal-Inn district
- Interactive map of Reut
- Location within Germany Location within Bavaria
- Coordinates: 48°18′40″N 12°56′34″E
- Country: Germany
- State: Bavaria
- Admin. region: Niederbayern
- District: Rottal-Inn
- Municipal assoc.: Tann
- Subdivisions: 3 Ortsteile

Government
  - Mayor (2020–26): Alois Alfranseder

Area
  - Total: 30.75 km^{2} (11.87 sq mi)
- Elevation: 460 m (1,510 ft)

Population (2025-12-31)
  - Total: 1,641
  - Density: 53.37/km^{2} (138.2/sq mi)
- Time zone: UTC+01:00 (CET)
  - Summer (DST): UTC+02:00 (CEST)
- Postal codes: 84367
- Dialling codes: 08572
- Vehicle registration: PAN
- Website: www.reut.de

Reut (German pronunciation: [ʁɔʏt]) is a municipality in the district of Rottal-Inn in Bavaria in Germany.
