= Tann (Verwaltungsgemeinschaft) =

- Verwaltungsgemeinschaft
- Location of Tann within Rottal-Inn district
- Interactive map of Tann
- Location within Germany Location within Bavaria
- Coordinates: 48°19′N 12°53′E
- Country: Germany
- State: Bavaria
- Admin. region: Lower Bavaria
- District: Rottal-Inn
- Seat: Tann
- Subdivisions: 2 municipalities

Area
  - Total: 68.29 km^{2} (26.37 sq mi)

Population (2025-12-31)
  - Total: 5,446
  - Density: 79.75/km^{2} (206.5/sq mi)
- Time zone: UTC+01:00 (CET)
  - Summer (DST): UTC+02:00 (CEST)
- Website: www.tann.de

Tann is a Verwaltungsgemeinschaft (municipal association) in the district Rottal-Inn in Bavaria, Germany. Its seat is in Tann.

It consists of the following municipalities:

1. Reut
2. Tann
