= Bad Birnbach =

- Municipality
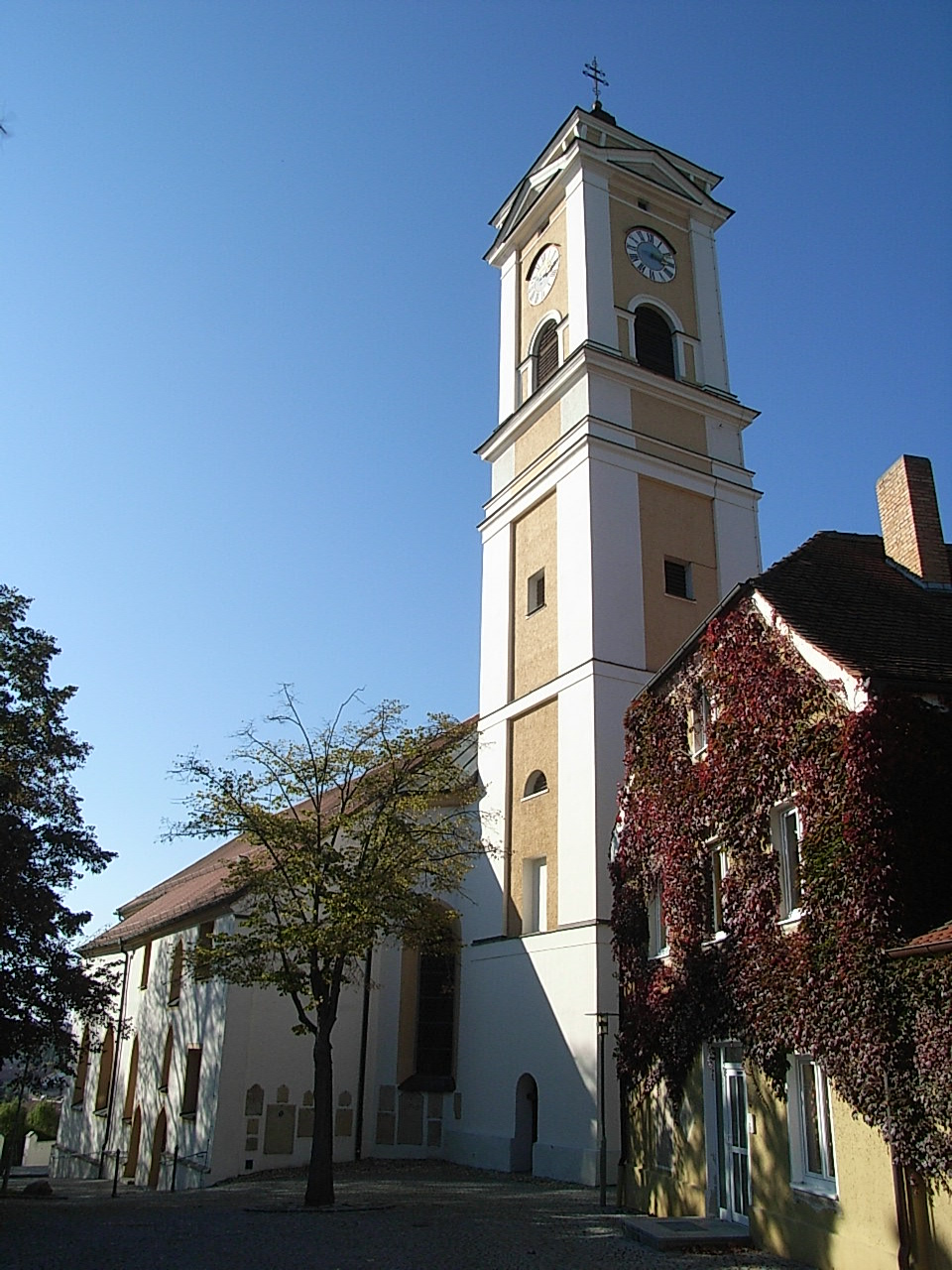
- Parish church in Bad Birnbach

- Coat of arms

- Location of Bad Birnbach within Rottal-Inn district
- Interactive map of Bad Birnbach
- Location within Germany Location within Bavaria
- Coordinates: 48°27′N 13°05′E
- Country: Germany
- State: Bavaria
- Admin. region: Niederbayern
- District: Rottal-Inn
- Municipal assoc.: Bad Birnbach

Government
  - Mayor (2020–26): Dagmar Feicht (CSU)

Area
  - Total: 68.83 km^{2} (26.58 sq mi)
- Elevation: 376 m (1,234 ft)

Population (2025-12-31)
  - Total: 5,829
  - Density: 84.69/km^{2} (219.3/sq mi)
- Time zone: UTC+01:00 (CET)
  - Summer (DST): UTC+02:00 (CEST)
- Postal codes: 84364
- Dialling codes: 08563
- Vehicle registration: PAN
- Website: www.badbirnbach.de

Bad Birnbach (German pronunciation: [baːt ˈbɪʁnbax]) is a municipality in the district of Rottal-Inn in Bavaria in Germany.
