= Ering =

- Municipality
- Coat of arms

- Location of Ering within Rottal-Inn district
- Interactive map of Ering
- Location within Germany Location within Bavaria
- Coordinates: 48°18′N 13°9′E
- Country: Germany
- State: Bavaria
- Admin. region: Niederbayern
- District: Rottal-Inn
- Municipal assoc.: Ering

Government
  - Mayor (2020–26): Johann Wagmann (CSU)

Area
  - Total: 39.56 km^{2} (15.27 sq mi)
- Elevation: 340 m (1,120 ft)

Population (2025-12-31)
  - Total: 1,864
  - Density: 47.12/km^{2} (122.0/sq mi)
- Time zone: UTC+01:00 (CET)
  - Summer (DST): UTC+02:00 (CEST)
- Postal codes: 94140
- Dialling codes: 08573
- Vehicle registration: PAN
- Website: www.ering-inn.de

Ering (German pronunciation: [ˈeːʁɪŋ]) is a municipality in the district of Rottal-Inn in Bavaria in Germany.
