= Geratskirchen =

- Municipality
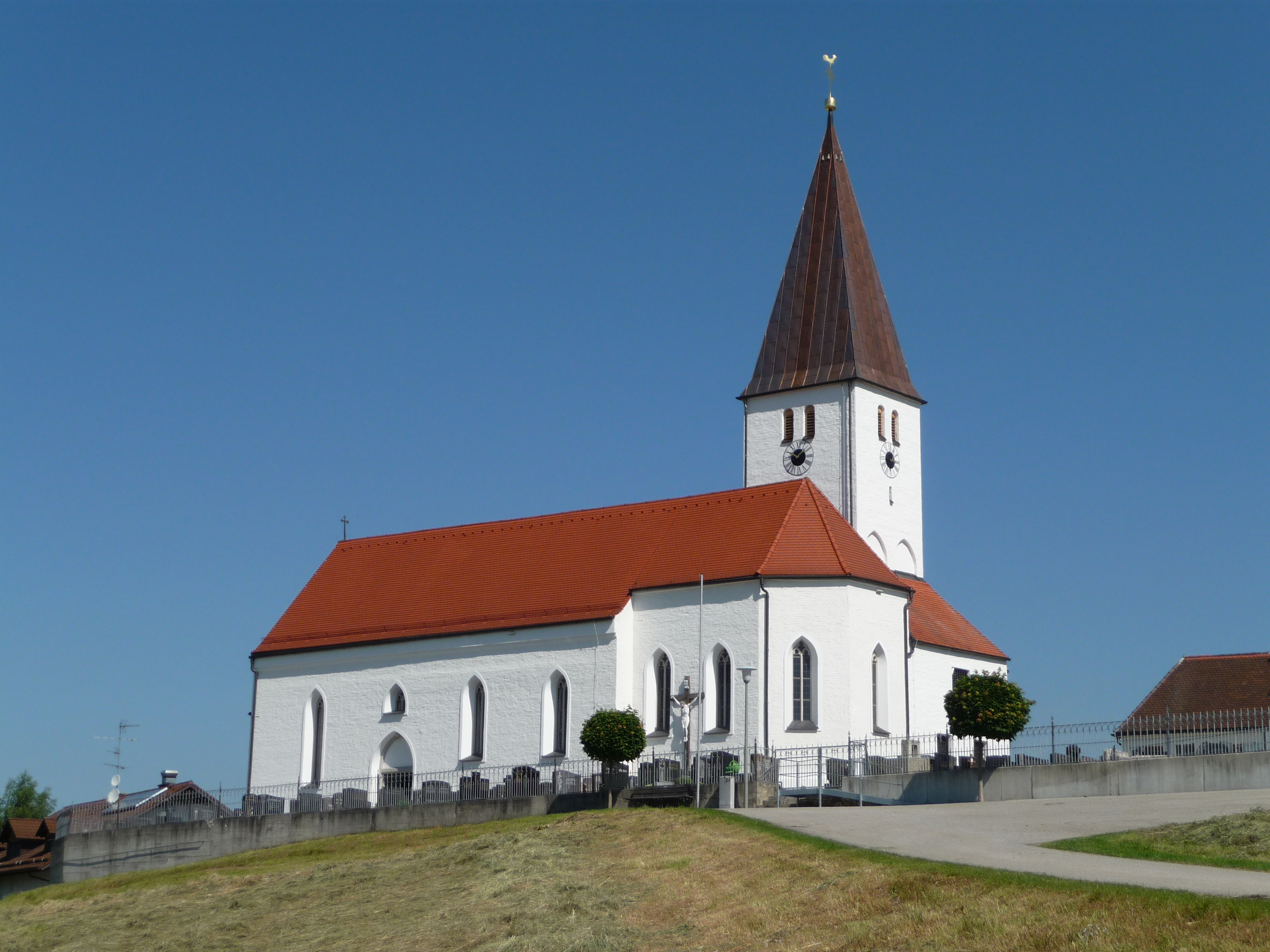
- Saint Martin Church

- Coat of arms

- Location of Geratskirchen within Rottal-Inn district
- Interactive map of Geratskirchen
- Location within Germany Location within Bavaria
- Coordinates: 48°20′N 12°40′E
- Country: Germany
- State: Bavaria
- Admin. region: Niederbayern
- District: Rottal-Inn
- Municipal assoc.: Massing

Government
  - Mayor (2020–26): Johann Gaßlbauer (FW)

Area
  - Total: 12.89 km^{2} (4.98 sq mi)
- Elevation: 441 m (1,447 ft)

Population (2025-12-31)
  - Total: 856
  - Density: 66.4/km^{2} (172/sq mi)
- Time zone: UTC+01:00 (CET)
  - Summer (DST): UTC+02:00 (CEST)
- Postal codes: 84552
- Dialling codes: 08728
- Vehicle registration: PAN
- Website: www.geratskirchen.de

Geratskirchen (German pronunciation: [ɡeːʁatsˈkɪʁçn̩]) is a municipality in the district of Rottal-Inn in Bavaria in Germany.
