= Bad Birnbach (Verwaltungsgemeinschaft) =

- Verwaltungsgemeinschaft
- Location of Bad Birnbach within Rottal-Inn district
- Interactive map of Bad Birnbach
- Location within Germany Location within Bavaria
- Coordinates: 48°27′N 13°05′E
- Country: Germany
- State: Bavaria
- Admin. region: Lower Bavaria
- District: Rottal-Inn
- Seat: Bad Birnbach
- Subdivisions: 2 municipalities

Area
  - Total: 88.26 km^{2} (34.08 sq mi)

Population (2025-12-31)
  - Total: 7,491
  - Density: 84.87/km^{2} (219.8/sq mi)
- Time zone: UTC+01:00 (CET)
  - Summer (DST): UTC+02:00 (CEST)
- Website: www.badbirnbach.net

Bad Birnbach is a Verwaltungsgemeinschaft (municipal association) in the district Rottal-Inn in Bavaria, Germany. Its seat is in Bad Birnbach.

It consists of the following municipalities:

1. Bad Birnbach
2. Bayerbach
