= Ering (Verwaltungsgemeinschaft) =

- Verwaltungsgemeinschaft
- Location of Ering within Rottal-Inn district
- Interactive map of Ering
- Location within Germany Location within Bavaria
- Coordinates: 48°18′N 13°09′E
- Country: Germany
- State: Bavaria
- Admin. region: Lower Bavaria
- District: Rottal-Inn
- Seat: Ering
- Subdivisions: 2 municipalities

Area
  - Total: 57.75 km^{2} (22.30 sq mi)

Population (2025-12-31)
  - Total: 3,287
  - Density: 56.92/km^{2} (147.4/sq mi)
- Time zone: UTC+01:00 (CET)
  - Summer (DST): UTC+02:00 (CEST)
- Website: www.ering-inn.de

Ering is a Verwaltungsgemeinschaft (municipal association) in the district Rottal-Inn in Bavaria, Germany. Its seat is in Ering.

It consists of the following municipalities:

1. Ering
2. Stubenberg
