= Unterdietfurt =

- Municipality
- Coat of arms

- Location of Unterdietfurt within Rottal-Inn district
- Interactive map of Unterdietfurt
- Location within Germany Location within Bavaria
- Coordinates: 48°23′N 12°39′E
- Country: Germany
- State: Bavaria
- Admin. region: Niederbayern
- District: Rottal-Inn

Government
  - Mayor (2020–26): Bernhard Blümelhuber

Area
  - Total: 27.49 km^{2} (10.61 sq mi)
- Elevation: 420 m (1,380 ft)

Population (2025-12-31)
  - Total: 2,269
  - Density: 82.54/km^{2} (213.8/sq mi)
- Time zone: UTC+01:00 (CET)
  - Summer (DST): UTC+02:00 (CEST)
- Postal codes: 84339
- Dialling codes: 08724
- Vehicle registration: PAN
- Website: www.unterdietfurt.de

Unterdietfurt is a municipality in the district of Rottal-Inn in Bavaria, Germany.
