= Roßbach, Bavaria =

Roßbach
- Municipality
- Coat of arms

- Location of Roßbach within Rottal-Inn district
- Interactive map of Roßbach
- Location within Germany Location within Bavaria
- Coordinates: 48°36′N 12°56′E
- Country: Germany
- State: Bavaria
- Admin. region: Niederbayern
- District: Rottal-Inn

Government
  - Mayor (2020–26): Ludwig Eder

Area
  - Total: 48.15 km^{2} (18.59 sq mi)
- Elevation: 331–451 m (1,086–1,480 ft)

Population (2025-12-31)
  - Total: 2,911
  - Density: 60.46/km^{2} (156.6/sq mi)
- Time zone: UTC+01:00 (CET)
  - Summer (DST): UTC+02:00 (CEST)
- Postal codes: 94439
- Dialling codes: 08547
- Vehicle registration: PAN
- Website: www.gemeinde-rossbach.de

Roßbach (German pronunciation: [ˈʁoːsˌbax]) is a municipality in the district of Rottal-Inn in Bavaria, Germany.
