= Egglham =

- Municipality
- Coat of arms

- Location of Egglham within Rottal-Inn district
- Interactive map of Egglham
- Location within Germany Location within Bavaria
- Coordinates: 48°32′N 13°4′E
- Country: Germany
- State: Bavaria
- Admin. region: Niederbayern
- District: Rottal-Inn

Government
  - Mayor (2020–26): Hermann Etzel (CSU)

Area
  - Total: 36.84 km^{2} (14.22 sq mi)
- Elevation: 353 m (1,158 ft)

Population (2025-12-31)
  - Total: 2,242
  - Density: 60.86/km^{2} (157.6/sq mi)
- Time zone: UTC+01:00 (CET)
  - Summer (DST): UTC+02:00 (CEST)
- Postal codes: 84385
- Dialling codes: 08543
- Vehicle registration: PAN
- Website: www.egglham.de

Egglham is a municipality in the district of Rottal-Inn in Bavaria in Germany.
