= Johanniskirchen =

- Municipality
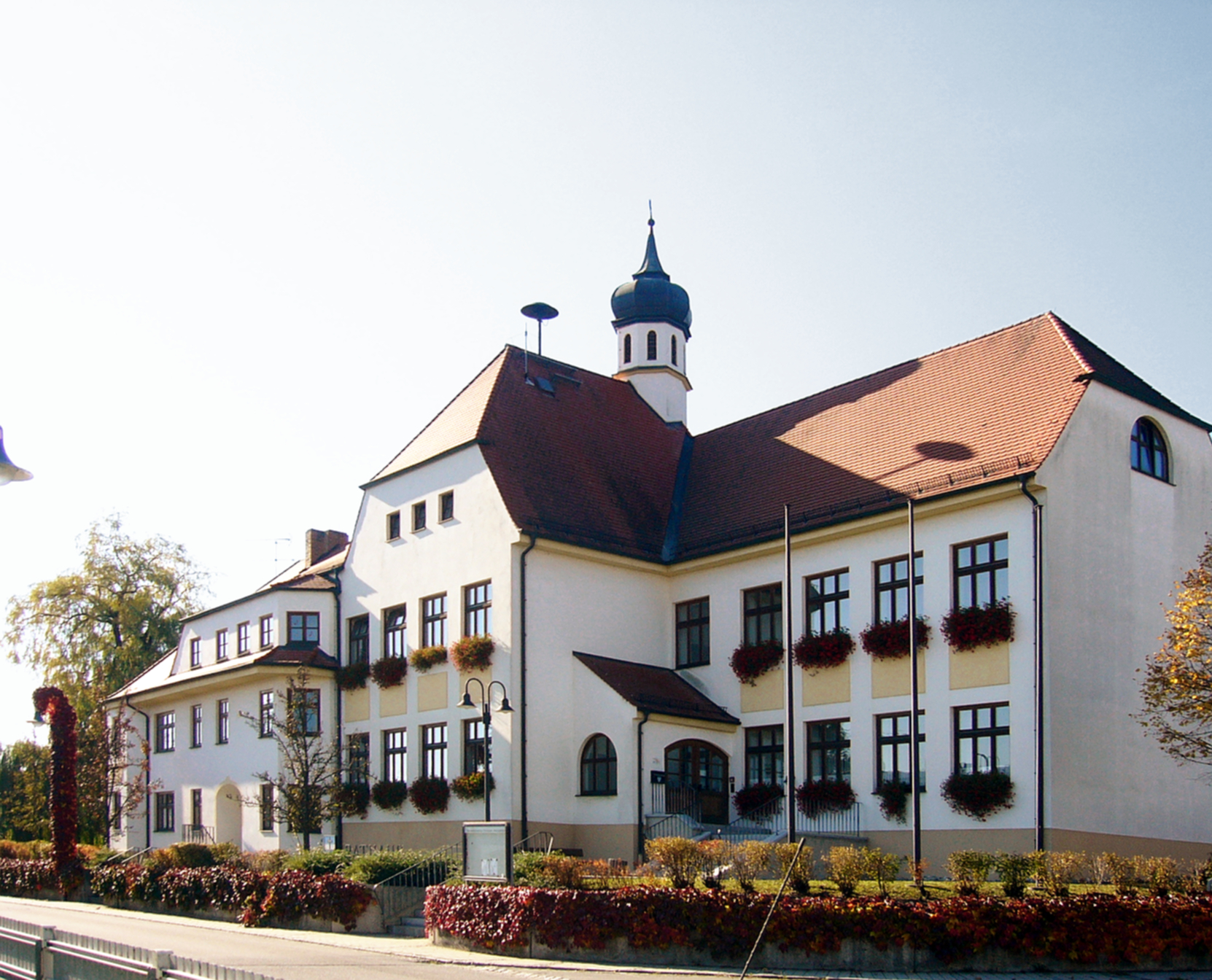
- Town hall

- Coat of arms

- Location of Johanniskirchen within Rottal-Inn district
- Interactive map of Johanniskirchen
- Location within Germany Location within Bavaria
- Coordinates: 48°32′N 12°57′E
- Country: Germany
- State: Bavaria
- Admin. region: Niederbayern
- District: Rottal-Inn

Government
  - Mayor (2020–26): Max Maier (FW)

Area
  - Total: 40.59 km^{2} (15.67 sq mi)
- Elevation: 330–450 m (1,080–1,480 ft)

Population (2025-12-31)
  - Total: 2,310
  - Density: 56.9/km^{2} (147/sq mi)
- Time zone: UTC+01:00 (CET)
  - Summer (DST): UTC+02:00 (CEST)
- Postal codes: 84381
- Dialling codes: 08564
- Vehicle registration: PAN
- Website: www.johanniskirchen.de

Johanniskirchen (German pronunciation: [joˈhanɪskɪʁçn̩]) is a municipality in the district of Rottal-Inn in Bavaria in Germany.
