= Hebertsfelden =

- Municipality
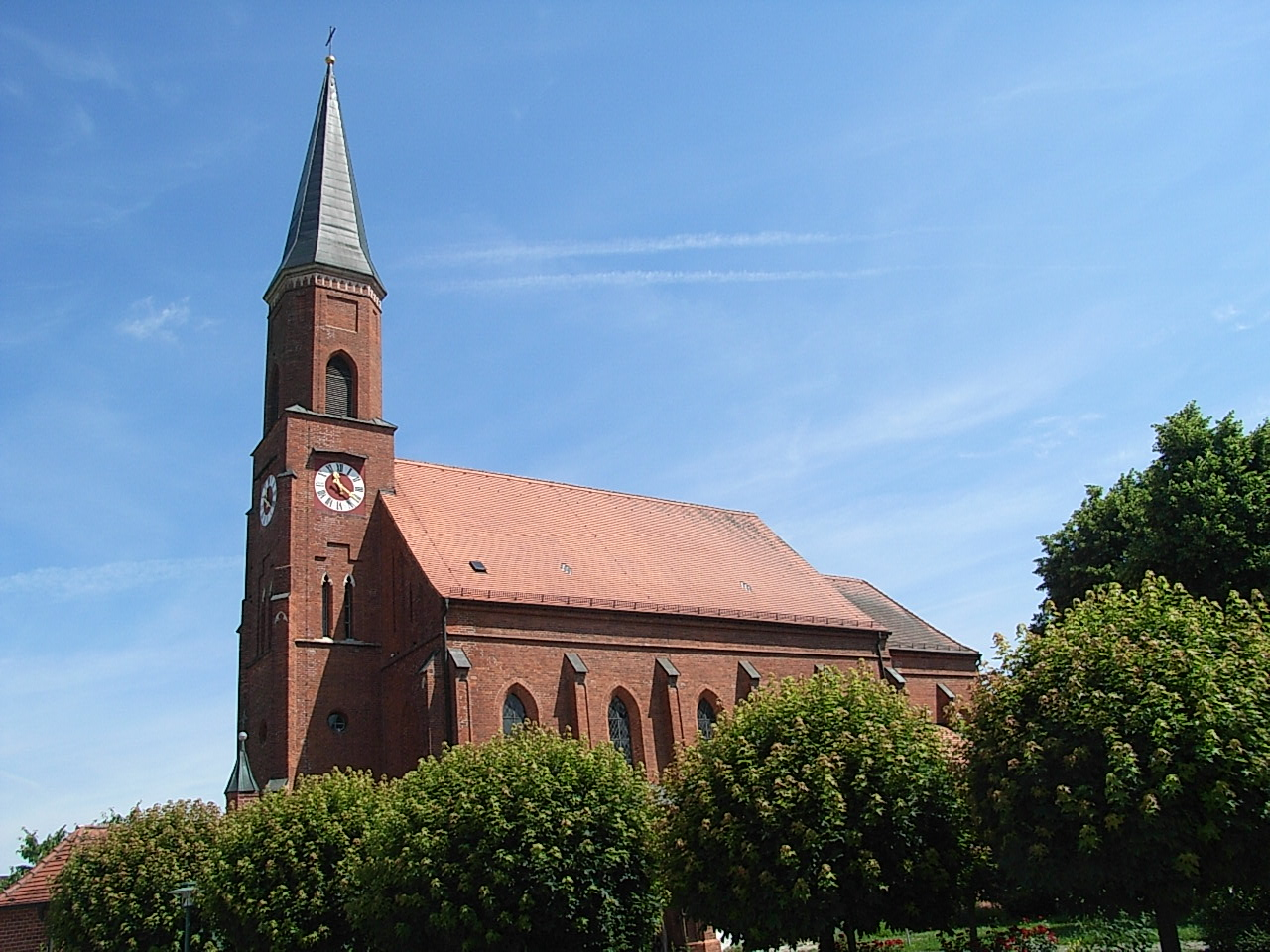
- Church of Saint Emmeram

- Coat of arms

- Location of Hebertsfelden within Rottal-Inn district
- Interactive map of Hebertsfelden
- Location within Germany Location within Bavaria
- Coordinates: 48°24′N 12°49′E
- Country: Germany
- State: Bavaria
- Admin. region: Niederbayern
- District: Rottal-Inn

Government
  - Mayor (2020–26): Karin Kienböck-Stöger

Area
  - Total: 49.78 km^{2} (19.22 sq mi)
- Elevation: 395–470 m (1,296–1,542 ft)

Population (2025-12-31)
  - Total: 3,622
  - Density: 72.76/km^{2} (188.4/sq mi)
- Time zone: UTC+01:00 (CET)
  - Summer (DST): UTC+02:00 (CEST)
- Postal codes: 84332
- Dialling codes: 08721
- Vehicle registration: PAN
- Website: www.hebertsfelden.de

Hebertsfelden (Central Bavarian: Hebertsfeidn) is a municipality in the district of Rottal-Inn in Bavaria of Germany.
