= Julbach =

- Municipality
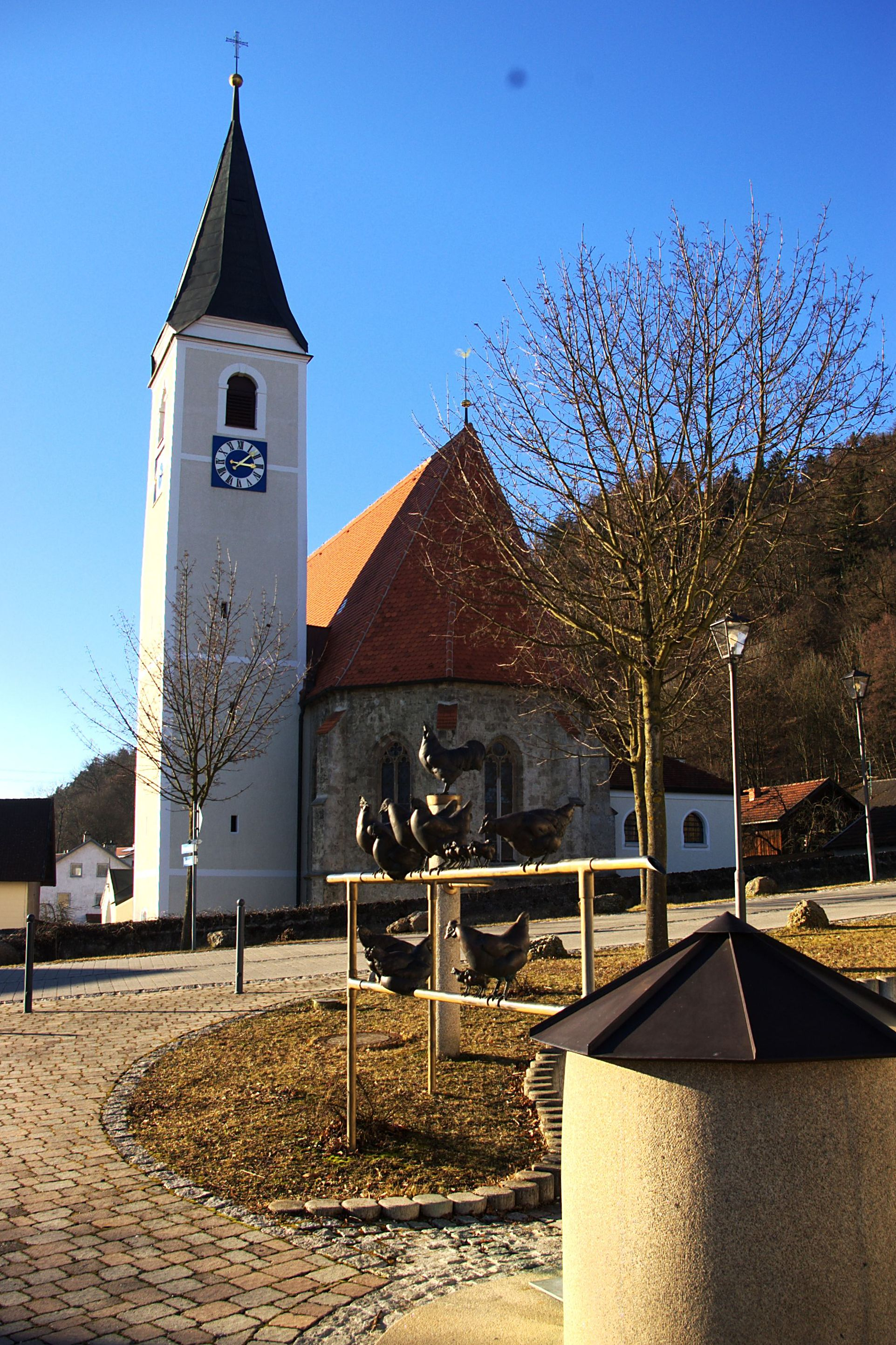
- Church of Saint Bartholomew

- Coat of arms

- Location of Julbach within Rottal-Inn district
- Interactive map of Julbach
- Location within Germany Location within Bavaria
- Coordinates: 48°15′18″N 12°57′33″E
- Country: Germany
- State: Bavaria
- Admin. region: Niederbayern
- District: Rottal-Inn
- Subdivisions: 4 Ortsteile

Government
  - Mayor (2020–26): Markus Schusterbauer (CSU)

Area
  - Total: 11.27 km^{2} (4.35 sq mi)
- Elevation: 383 m (1,257 ft)

Population (2025-12-31)
  - Total: 2,306
  - Density: 204.6/km^{2} (529.9/sq mi)
- Time zone: UTC+01:00 (CET)
  - Summer (DST): UTC+02:00 (CEST)
- Postal codes: 84387
- Dialling codes: 08571
- Vehicle registration: PAN
- Website: www.julbach.de

Julbach is a village and municipality in the district of Rottal-Inn in Bavaria in Germany. In addition to the village of Julbach, the municipality includes 16 other settlements.
