= Stubenberg, Bavaria =

Stubenberg
- Municipality
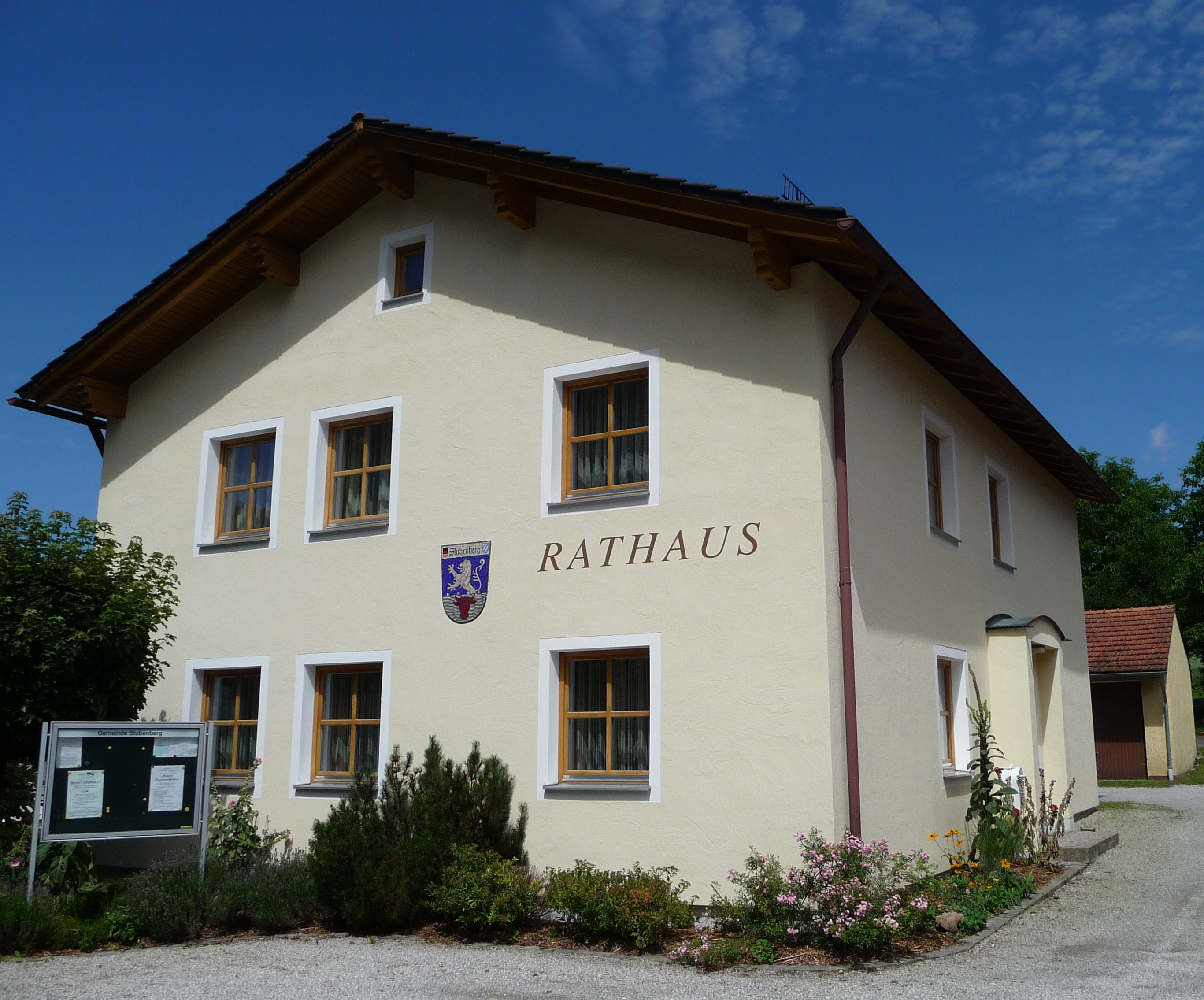
- Town hall

- Coat of arms

- Location of Stubenberg within Rottal-Inn district
- Interactive map of Stubenberg
- Location within Germany Location within Bavaria
- Coordinates: 48°19′N 13°5′E
- Country: Germany
- State: Bavaria
- Admin. region: Niederbayern
- District: Rottal-Inn
- Municipal assoc.: Ering

Government
  - Mayor (2020–26): Willibald Galleitner (FW)

Area
  - Total: 18.19 km^{2} (7.02 sq mi)
- Elevation: 425 m (1,394 ft)

Population (2025-12-31)
  - Total: 1,423
  - Density: 78.23/km^{2} (202.6/sq mi)
- Time zone: UTC+01:00 (CET)
  - Summer (DST): UTC+02:00 (CEST)
- Postal codes: 94166
- Dialling codes: 08571
- Vehicle registration: PAN
- Website: www.stubenberg.de

Stubenberg (German pronunciation: [ˈʃtuːbn̩ˌbɛʁk]) is a municipality in the district of Rottal-Inn in Bavaria in Germany. It lies on the river Inn, close to the border with Austria.
