= Triftern =

- Municipality
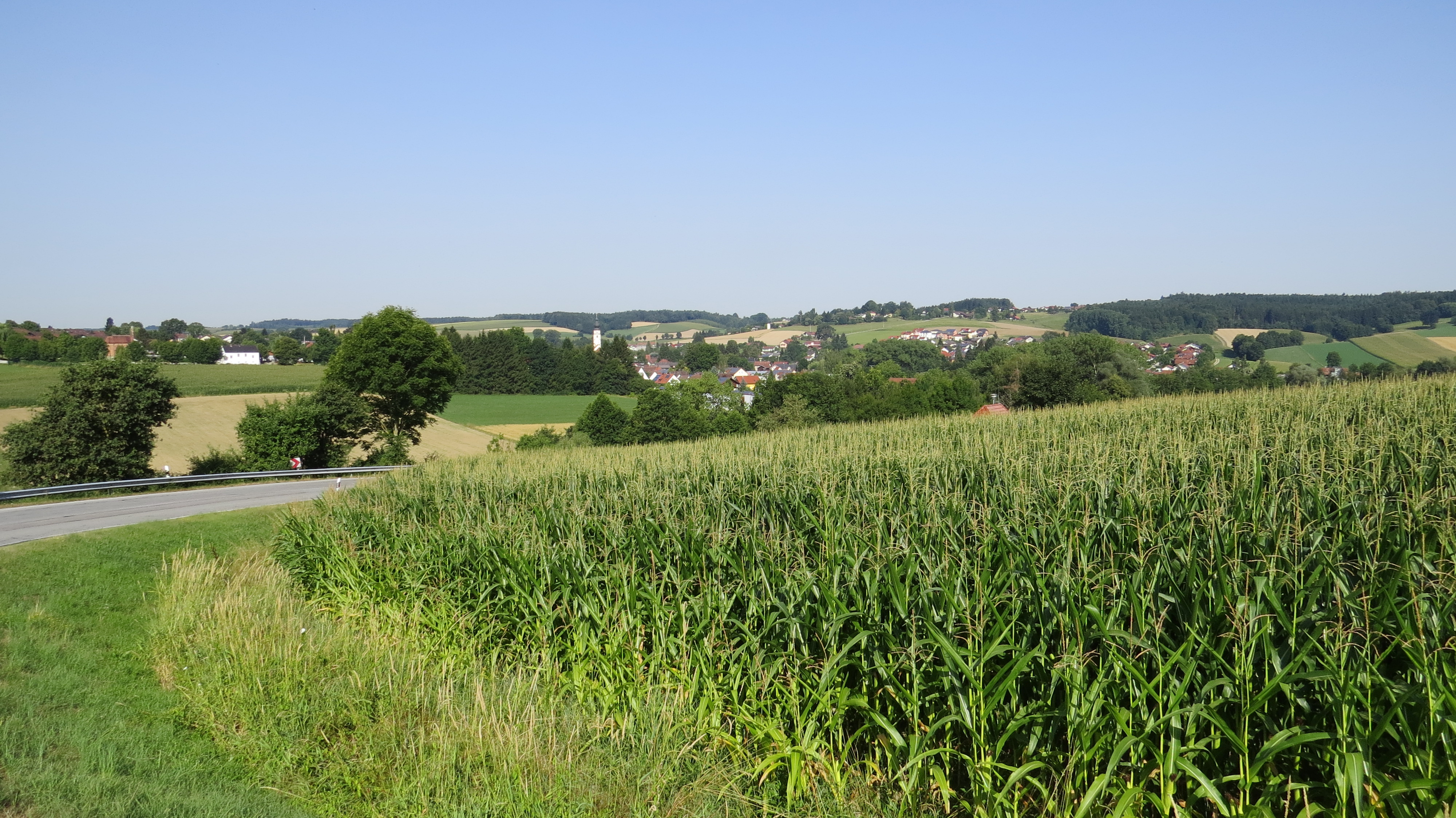
- Triftern seen from the east

- Coat of arms

- Location of Triftern within Rottal-Inn district
- Interactive map of Triftern
- Location within Germany Location within Bavaria
- Coordinates: 48°24′N 13°01′E
- Country: Germany
- State: Bavaria
- Admin. region: Niederbayern
- District: Rottal-Inn

Government
  - Mayor (2019–25): Edith Lirsch (ÖDP)

Area
  - Total: 62.24 km^{2} (24.03 sq mi)
- Elevation: 391 m (1,283 ft)

Population (2025-12-31)
  - Total: 5,407
  - Density: 86.87/km^{2} (225.0/sq mi)
- Time zone: UTC+01:00 (CET)
  - Summer (DST): UTC+02:00 (CEST)
- Postal codes: 84371
- Dialling codes: 08562
- Vehicle registration: PAN
- Website: www.triftern.de

Triftern (German pronunciation: [ˈtʁɪftɐn]) is a municipality in the district of Rottal-Inn in Bavaria in Germany.
