= Tann, Bavaria =

Tann
- Municipality
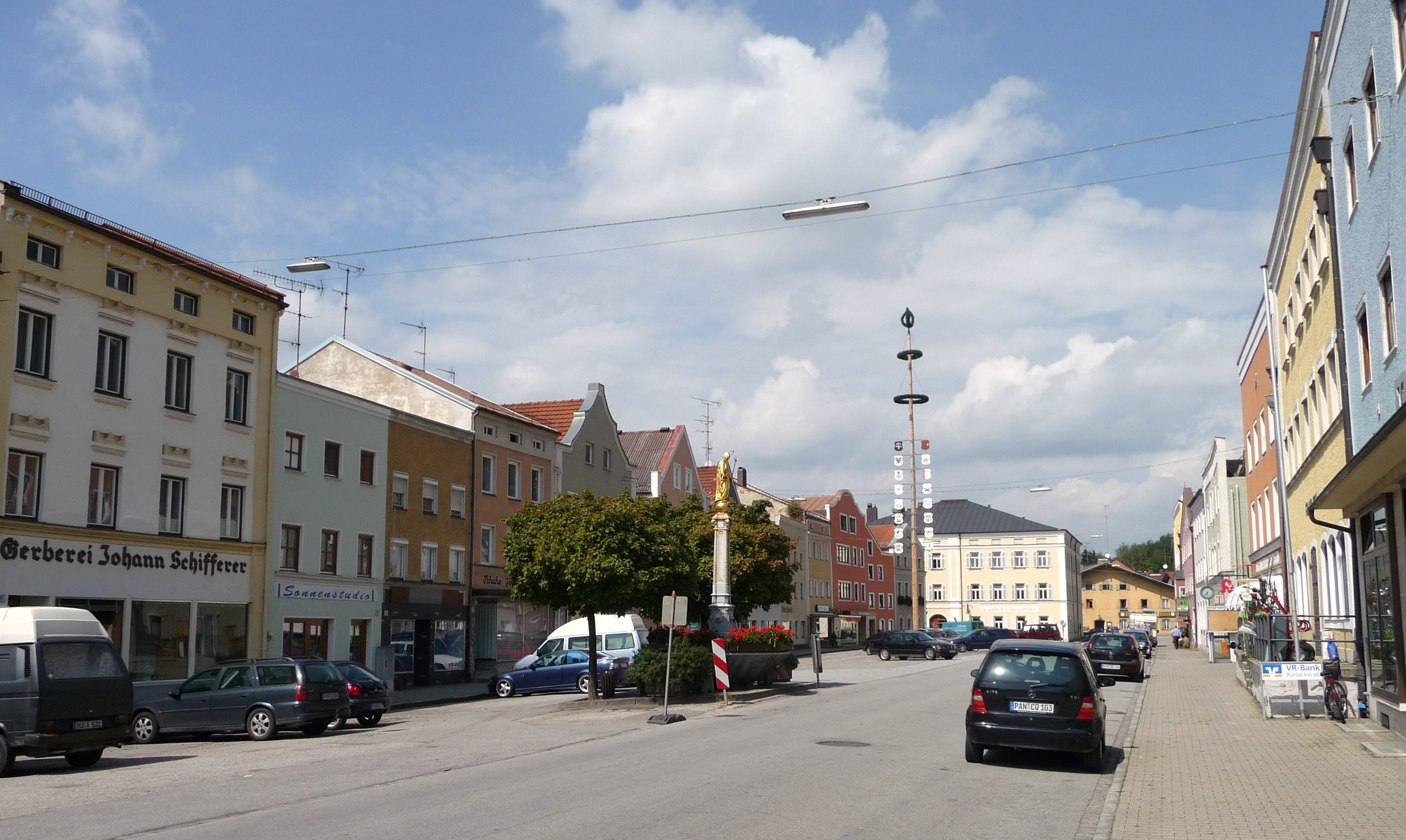
- Market square in Tann

- Coat of arms

- Location of Tann within Rottal-Inn district
- Interactive map of Tann
- Location within Germany Location within Bavaria
- Coordinates: 48°19′N 12°54′E
- Country: Germany
- State: Bavaria
- Admin. region: Niederbayern
- District: Rottal-Inn
- Municipal assoc.: Tann

Government
  - Mayor (2020–26): Wolfgang Schmid

Area
  - Total: 37.55 km^{2} (14.50 sq mi)
- Elevation: 447 m (1,467 ft)

Population (2025-12-31)
  - Total: 3,805
  - Density: 101.3/km^{2} (262.4/sq mi)
- Time zone: UTC+01:00 (CET)
  - Summer (DST): UTC+02:00 (CEST)
- Postal codes: 84367
- Dialling codes: 08572
- Vehicle registration: PAN
- Website: www.tann.de

Tann (German pronunciation: [tan]) is a municipality in the district of Rottal-Inn in Bavaria, Germany. It has about 4,000 inhabitants and is 15 km from the corner of Austria away. Notable sites include the historic marketplace and the church St. Peter and Paul.

The first time Tann is mentioned in an historical document was in the year 927 in context with the bishop of Salzburg Adalbert. In 1389 Tann became a so-called 'marketplace' and got the right to hold markets. From the year 1300 to 1900 the most important business sector was the weaving mills. In old bills from the traders are named destinations for their drapery, such as Trieste, Genoa, Venice and Amsterdam.

At the end of the 17th century, began a pilgrimage to the "Godfather of Tann," a wooden cross. The saga tells that the beard and hair of the crucifix began to grow, and then many miracles happened caused by the cross.
