= Rott (Inn, Neuhaus am Inn) =

River in Bavaria, Germany

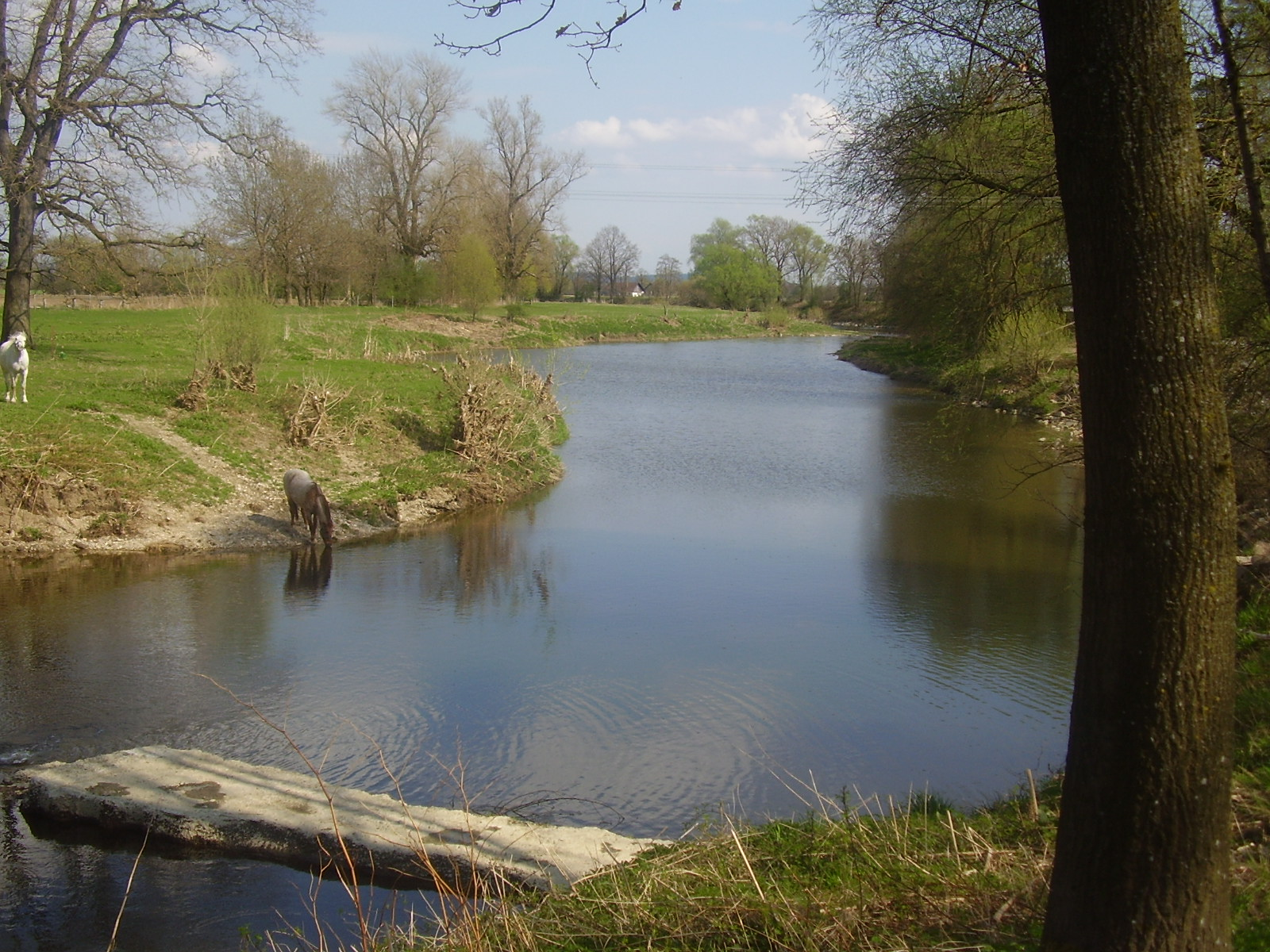

Location
- Country: Germany
- State: Bavaria

Physical characteristics
- Source
  - location: Lower Bavaria
- Mouth
  - location: Inn
  - coordinates: 48°27′12″N 13°25′32″E
- Length: 111.4 km (69.2 mi)
- Basin size: 1,200 km^{2} (460 sq mi)

Basin features
- Progression: Inn→ Danube→ Black Sea

The Rott (German pronunciation: [ʁɔt]) is a 111-kilometre-long (69 mi) river in Bavaria, Germany. It is a left tributary of the Inn. Its source is in the municipality Wurmsham in Lower Bavaria, between the towns of Landshut and Waldkraiburg. It flows east through a rural area with small towns, including Neumarkt-Sankt Veit, Eggenfelden, Pfarrkirchen and Pocking. It flows into the Inn near Neuhaus am Inn, opposite Schärding, on the border with Austria.

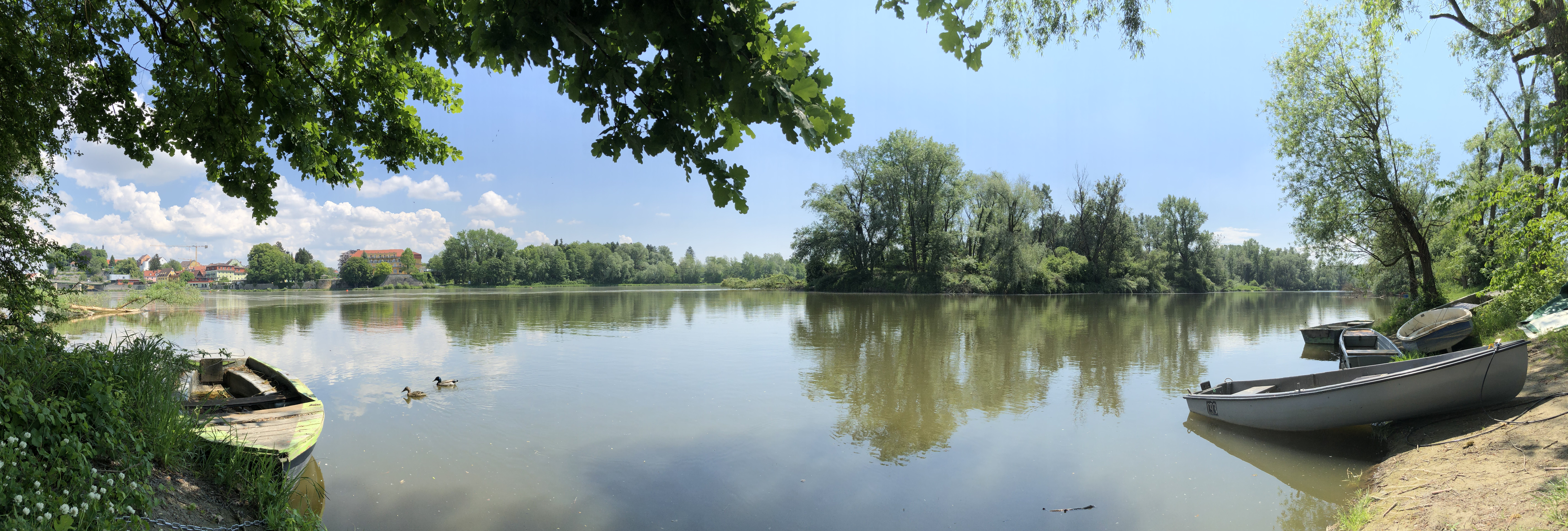
Confluence of Rott (from the right) and Inn

== See also ==
- List of rivers of Bavaria
