= Eggenfelden =

- Town
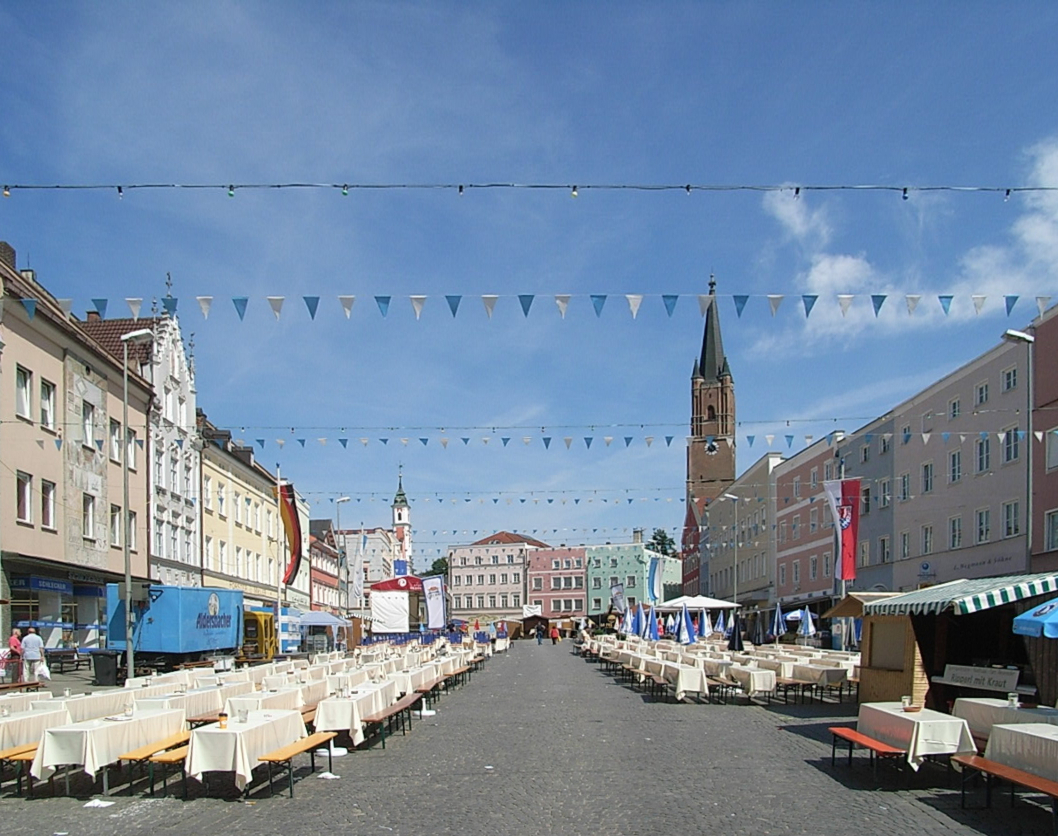
- Town square

- Coat of arms

- Location of Eggenfelden within Rottal-Inn district
- Interactive map of Eggenfelden
- Location within Germany Location within Bavaria
- Coordinates: 48°24′14″N 12°45′51″E
- Country: Germany
- State: Bavaria
- Admin. region: Niederbayern
- District: Rottal-Inn
- Subdivisions: 7 quarters

Government
  - Mayor (2020–26): Martin Biber (CSU)

Area
  - Total: 44.35 km^{2} (17.12 sq mi)
- Elevation: 416 m (1,365 ft)

Population (2025-12-31)
  - Total: 14,295
  - Density: 322.3/km^{2} (834.8/sq mi)
- Time zone: UTC+01:00 (CET)
  - Summer (DST): UTC+02:00 (CEST)
- Postal codes: 84307 8330,8331
- Dialling codes: 08721
- Vehicle registration: PAN, EG, GRI, VIB
- Website: www.eggenfelden.de

Eggenfelden (German pronunciation: [ˌɛɡn̩ˈfɛldn̩]; Central Bavarian: Eggenfejdn) is a municipality in the district of Rottal-Inn in Bavaria, Germany.

== Geography ==
=== Geographical location ===
Eggenfelden is located in the valley of the Rott at the intersection of B 20 with the B 388 and the beginning of the B 588. The city has two railway stations on the railway Passau - Neumarkt - Sankt Veit as well as an airfield (airfield Eggenfelden). Eggenfelden is located about 56 km southeast of Landshut, 60 km south of Straubing, 70 km south-west of Passau, 84 kilometers north of Salzburg and 110 kilometers east of Munich.

== Communal ==
The municipality Eggenfelden has 119 officially named Stadtteile:

- Afuswimm
- Aichner
- Aign
- Altenburg
- Anzengrub
- Asbach
- Au
- Axöd
- Axöd-Siedlung
- Bachkampel
- Berg
- Bruck
- Bruckhäuser
- Buchner
- Dietraching
- Drittenbrei
- Dürrwimm
- Eder vorm Wald
- Edmertsee
- Eggenfelden
- Falterer
- Fäustlinger
- Fraunhofen
- Freiung
- Fuchsberg
- Fuchsmühle
- Fußöd
- Gaisberg
- Gall
- Gern
- Gfürt
- Giglberg
- Gras
- Gschwend
- Hänghub
- Hartlwimm
- Haus
- Heckengrub
- Hetzenberg
- Hinterhöll
- Hochwimm
- Höll
- Holzbruck
- Holzhäuseln
- Holzkeller
- Holzner
- Holzschachten
- Hub
- Kagern
- Kampelsberg
- Kaspersbach
- Kastenberg
- Käufl
- Kirchberg
- Kleeham
- Kleingmain
- Klohub
- Kollersberg
- Königsöd
- Kreuzöd
- Kronwitt
- Lauterbach
- Lichtenberg
- Lichtlberg
- Lindhof
- Loh
- Luderfing
- Lug
- Maißling
- Mitterhof
- Mitterpirsting
- Moosham
- Neustatt
- Niederndorf
- Oberkampel
- Oberkirchberg
- Oberpirsting
- Oberthal
- Oberzeiling
- Peterskirchen
- Pirsting
- Pischelsberg
- Pollersbach
- Prühmühle
- Reiter
- Reiter am Wald
- Rinn
- Rott
- Rott am Wald
- Rottmühle
- Rushäusl
- Sandtner
- Sankt Sebastian
- Simonsöd
- Spanberg
- Sperwies
- Stock
- Straß I
- Straß II
- Straßhäuseln
- Stumsöd
- Taschnerhof
- Thal
- Tiefstadt
- Untereschlbach
- Unterkampel
- Untermaisbach
- Unterpirsting
- Unterthal
- Unterzeiling
- Vorderhöll
- Weg
- Weilberg
- Weilberg-Siedlung
- Weinberg
- Wimm
- Wolfsberg
- Zainach
- Zellhub

== Mayors ==
- 1946–1948: Lorenz Fichtner, SPD
- 1948–1960: Lorenz Bachmeier, CSU
- 1960–1990: Hans Kreck, SPD
- 1990–2002: Karl Riedler, SPD
- 2002–2014: Werner Schießl, FWG
- 2014–2020: Wolfgang Grubwinkler, UWG
- since 2020: Martin Biber, CSU

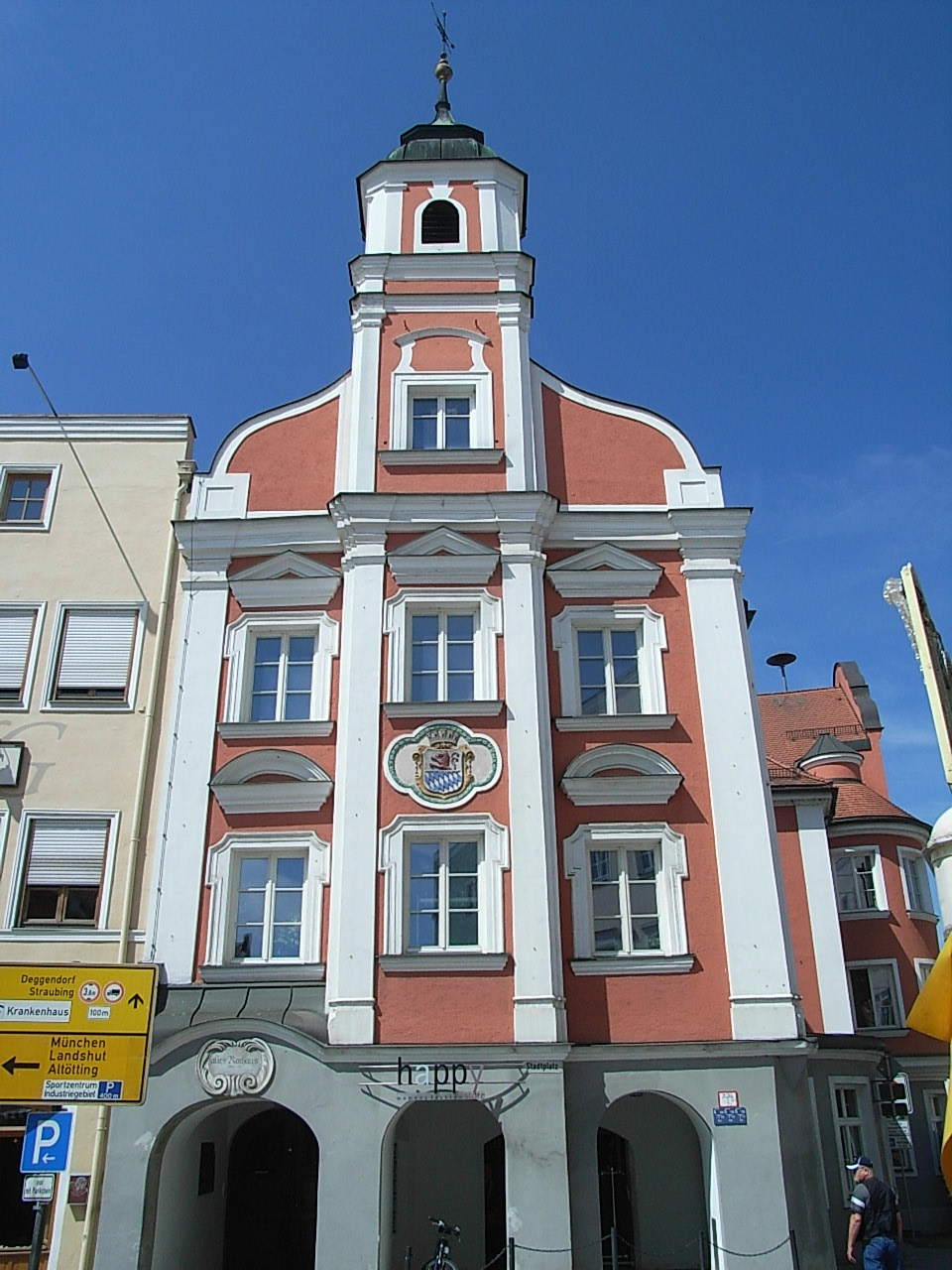
Old town hall Eggenfelden

== Notable people ==
- The ski mountaineer Konrad Lex was born in Eggenfelden.
- The German pop-singer and actor Daniel Küblböck who achieved short-lived celebrity in 2003, in the first season of Deutschland sucht den Superstar (DSDS), the German version of Pop Idol, in which he came third, was born outside of Eggenfelden and lived here until his breakthrough.

== Personalities ==
=== Sons and daughters of the city ===
- Albert Hahl (1868-1945), German colonial officer and governor of German-New Guinea
- Richard Schimpf (1897-1972), officer of the German Army, the Reichswehr, the Wehrmacht and the Bundeswehr (last rank major general)
- Friedrich Müller (born 1938), legal scientist and author
- Joseph Vogl (born 1957), literary and media scientist
- Katrin Garfoot (born 1981), Australian cyclist
- Barbara Lechner (born 1982), shooting sports woman

=== Other people related to Eggenfelden ===
- Fritz Wiedemann (1891-1970), German officer, adjutant of Adolf Hitler and diplomat
- Daniel Küblböck (1985-2018), singer
