= Pfarrkirchen =

- Town
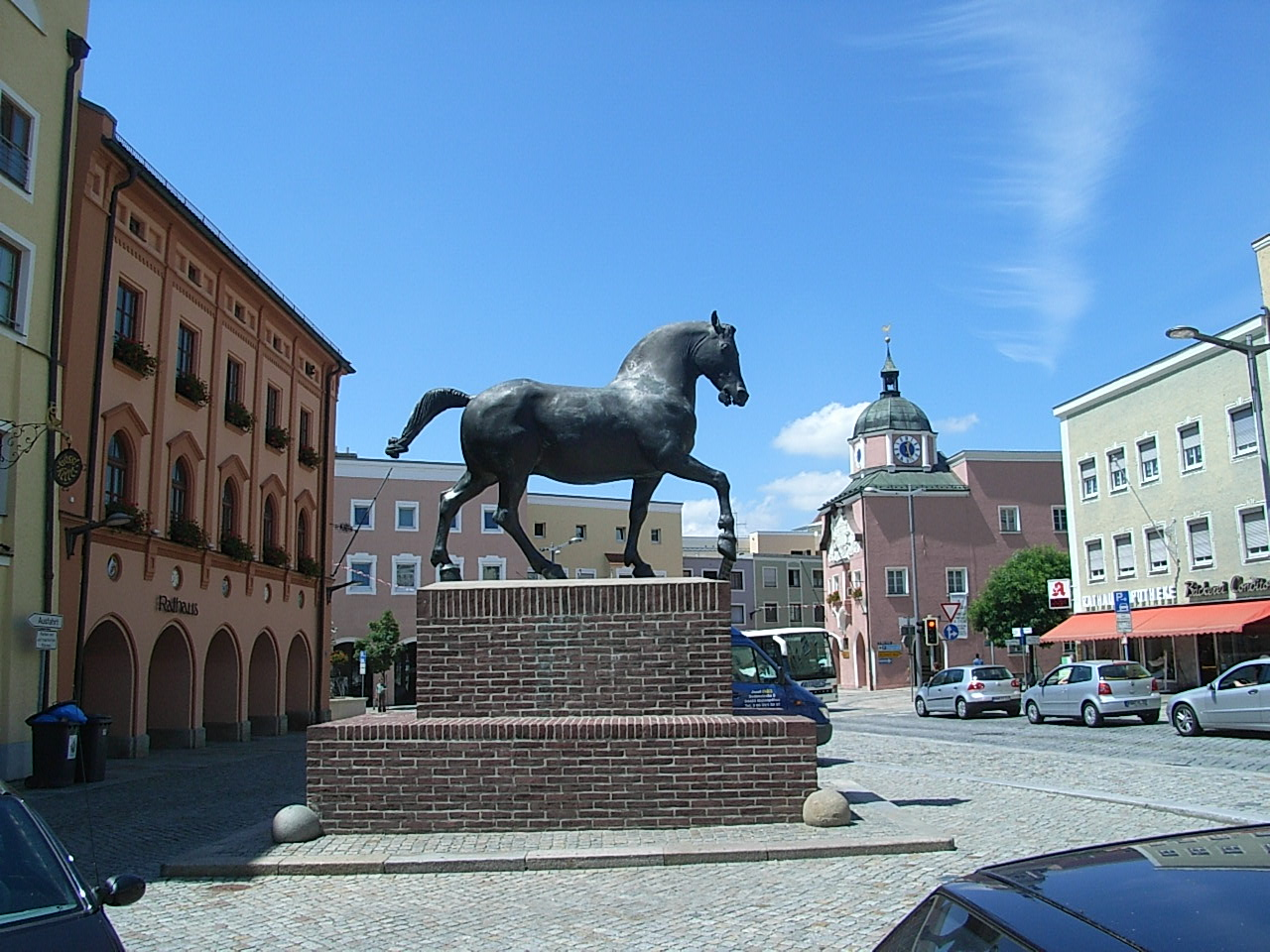
- Part of town square

- Coat of arms

- Location of Pfarrkirchen within Rottal-Inn district
- Interactive map of Pfarrkirchen
- Location within Germany Location within Bavaria
- Coordinates: 48°25′N 12°55′E
- Country: Germany
- State: Bavaria
- Admin. region: Lower Bavaria
- District: Rottal-Inn

Government
  - Mayor (2020–26): Wolfgang Beißmann (CSU)

Area
  - Total: 52.35 km^{2} (20.21 sq mi)
- Elevation: 381 m (1,250 ft)

Population (2025-12-31)
  - Total: 12,842
  - Density: 245.3/km^{2} (635.4/sq mi)
- Time zone: UTC+01:00 (CET)
  - Summer (DST): UTC+02:00 (CEST)
- Postal codes: 84347
- Dialling codes: 08561
- Vehicle registration: PAN
- Website: pfarrkirchen.de

Pfarrkirchen (German pronunciation: [pfaʁˈkɪʁçn̩]) is a municipality in southern Lower Bavaria Germany, the capital of the district Rottal-Inn. It has about 12,500 inhabitants and is an important school centre with about 10,000 pupils from all over Lower Bavaria. The town spreads over an area of about 52 square kilometers and lies approximately 377 meters above sea level. Pfarrkirchen lies at the small river "Rott", which gives the "Rottal" region its name. One of Pfarrkirchen's important industries include abattoirs which is due to the rural environment.

== History ==
The first settlers came to Pfarrkirchen some 7,000 years ago, as excavations in Untergaiching (a small suburb) prove. The first official written document where the name "Pharrachiricha" is mentioned, appeared in between 875 and 899 AD by the Catholic Bishop "Engilmar". The name means "parish church". In 1262 Pfarrkirchen and the nearby "Castle Reichenberg" passed into the possession of the Bavarian dynasty Wittelsbach, who granted the village the right to hold public markets in 1317. Since 1862 Pfarrkirchen can officially call itself a town, and in 1972 it became the capital of the district Rottal-Inn.

== Places of interest ==
The town's best known landmark is the "Gartlbergkirche", a pilgrimage church for the Virgin Mary. It was built upon Pfarrkirchen's highest hill in between 1661 and 1715, according to the plans of the Italian architect Domenico Zuccali. The two towers of the Baroque Church dominate the town's scenery and can be seen even from miles away.

Another well known sight of Pfarrkirchen is the so-called "Wimmer-Roß", an oversized bronze statue, which is located at the heart of the town, showing a black stallion. It was built in 1942 by the sculptor Hans Wimmer, who donated the statue to his hometown. It symbolizes the high status of horse breeding in the Rottal region. Pfarrkirchen also possesses Bavaria's oldest Harness Racing Track, where horse races have been held since 1894.

== Twin towns and sister cities ==
- Saint-Rémy-de-Provence, southern France, since 1991
- The region Luzerner Rottal comprising the towns Ruswil, Ettiswil, Buttisholz, and Grosswangen in Switzerland, since 1997
- San Vincenzo, Tuscany, Italy, since 1998

== Notable people ==
- Conrad Fink (1900–1981), politician
