= Landau–Arnstorf railway =

Former railway line in Germany

Landau–Arnstorf
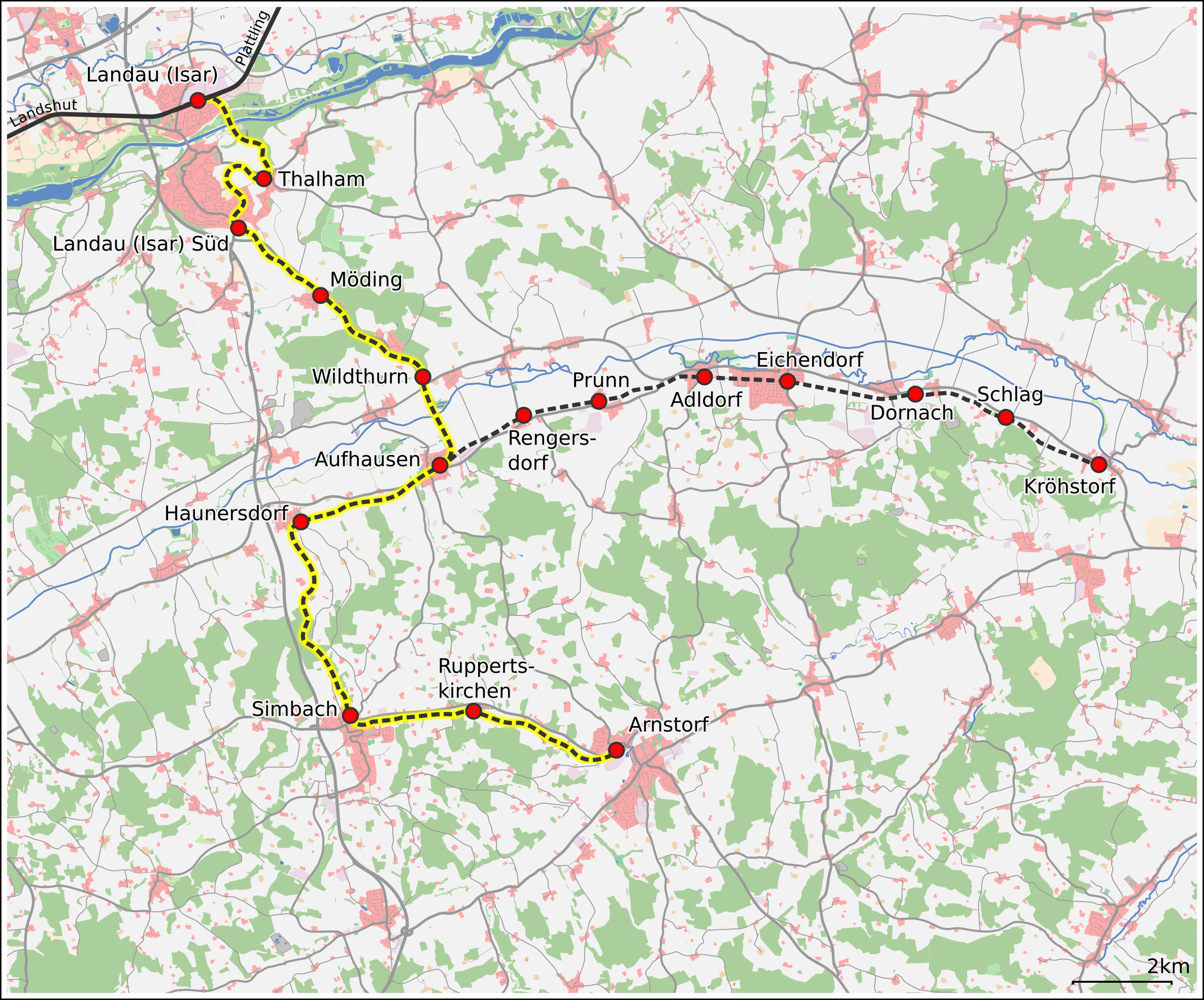

Overview
- Line number: 5640

Technical
- Line length: 24.22 km (15.05 mi)
- Track gauge: 1,435 mm (4.708 ft)

The Landau–Arnstorf railway was a branch line from Landau an der Isar to Arnstorf in the province of Lower Bavaria in southern Germany.

== Conception ==
At the end of the 19th century the region around the market towns of Arnstorf and Eichendorf was surrounded by railways, but none actually entered the area. On 1 April 1894 there was a public meeting in Arnstorf with representatives of the 24 participating municipalities, the outcome of which was a decision to apply for the construction of a railway to Arnstorf. The question of where the junction was to be made was left open.

The head office of the Transport Institute pressed for a decision on the junction to be made between Landau or Eggenfelden. On 18 January 1896 the Mayor of Arnstorf, Zöllner, and the Mayor of Landau, Steinbauer, recommended a railway line from Landau to Arnstorf. After further discussions, for example about the option for an extension of the line to Münchsdorf, the Lokalbahn from Landau (Isar) to Arnstorf was approved by law on 30 June 1900.

== Construction ==
The construction costs were estimated at 2,114,000 gold marks, of which the interested parties had to contribute 157,500 marks. At that time Arnstorf had 1,400 inhabitants, Simbach over 700 and Eichendorf more than 1,100. A total of 18,400 people lived within the catchment area of the line.

On 4 July 1900 the folk of Landau and Arnstorf met at a joint celebration and sent a greeting and thank you telegram to the state government. The most important proponent of the Lokalbahn had been the district doctor and member of parliament, Dr. Josef Hauber.

The construction of the line required 300,000 cubic metres of earth to be moved. As was normal, the interested parties had to make the land available free of charge. Because Arnstorf had to raise its contribution of 50,000 marks through a loan, the market town's council decided on 10 May 1901 to pay this off by raising a surcharge on local malt of 1.40 marks per hectolitre, which resulted in an increase in the price of beer from 20 to 22 pfennigs per litre. In spite of a degree of unrest, this measure was pushed through.

== Operation ==
The line was opened on 29 December 1903 and services began on New Year's Eve. The line departed from the eastern end of Landau station and turned in a sharp bend into the valley of the River Isar, which it crossed. It reached the watershed between the Isar and the Vils at a height of 420 metres and crossed the Vils near Aufhausen on a flood embankment. South of Haunersdorf it climbed up to the second ridge between the Vils and Kollbach valleys at a height of 445 metres. Running alongside the district highway it reached the station of Arnstorf, a massive three-storey building on the northwestern side of the market town.

In 1908 the construction of the Aufhausen–Kröhstorf railway was approved, but this stub line could not be opened until 1915, when the market town of Eichendorf finally received a railway connexion. On 30 December 1953 there was a big celebration to mark the line's 50th anniversary. The anniversary special was hauled by locomotive 64 438, decked out in festive decorations, which left Landau at 13:10 and arrived in Arnstorf at 14:31.

Nevertheless, operations never made a profit. The number of tickets sold in Arnstorf fell from 13,624 in 1952 to 9,417 1958 and just 836 in 1963. The number of wagon loads dispatched fell from 6,235 tonnes to 4,046 tonnes to 1,415 tonnes; and the number of wagon loads received from 9,413 tonnes to 6,898 tonnes before rising again to 8,688 tonnes. In Simbach station the number of tickets sold fell drastically from 11,086 to 8,063 to 681; whilst wagon loads dispatched rose from 643 tonnes to 1,625 tonnes then fell again to 544 tonnes. By contrast the wagon loads received rose from 2,573 tonnes in 1952 to 3,877 tonnes in 1958 to 5,014 tonnes in 1963.

== Closure ==
With the implementation of the 1961 summer timetable the number of trains was reduced and DB buses laid on in both directions. Uerdingen railbuses had already superseded the DRG Class 64 steam locomotives. On 27 September 1964 passenger services were finally withdrawn. Small diesel shunters (Kleinlokomotiven) took over the goods traffic and, each autumn, there was a lot of traffic during the sugar beet harvest.

Following the demolition of the goods shed at Arnstorf and Haunersdorf station, in January 1978 Wildthurn station was knocked down. On 10 July 1982 a passenger train ran again, when the firm of Akustikbau Lindner hired a large special train for a works excursion. On 31 May 1994 goods traffic finally ceased and the tracks were lifted in 1998. On 24 August 1999 the Landau a. d. Isar–Arnstorf cycle path was opened on the trackbed of the old railway.

== See also ==
- Royal Bavarian State Railways
- Bavarian branch lines
- List of closed railway lines in Bavaria

== Sources ==
- Walther Zeitler (1985), Eisenbahnen in Niederbayern and in of the Oberpfalz (in German), Weiden: Buch & Kunstverlag Oberpfalz, ISBN 3-924350-01-9
