= Embach =

Embach may refer to:

== Geography ==
Places

- Embach, Austria, mountain village near Salzburg
- Embach, Germany, villages in Bavaria, Germany:
  - Embach in Dorfen, Erding, Upper Bavaria
  - Embach in Siegsdorf, Traunstein, Upper Bavaria
  - Embach in Malgersdorf, Rottal-Inn, Lower Bavaria
  - Embach in Obertraubling, Regensburg, Upper Palatinate

Rivers

- Emajõgi, river in Estonia, previously known as Embach in German
- Väike Emajõgi, river in Estonia, previously known as Kleiner Embach in German
- Velikaya River, river in Russia, also known as Pleskau Embach in German

== People with the surname ==
- Carsten Embach (born 1968), German bobsledder
