= Adldorf =

Village in Bavaria, Germany

Coordinates: 48°38′1″N 12°50′3″E

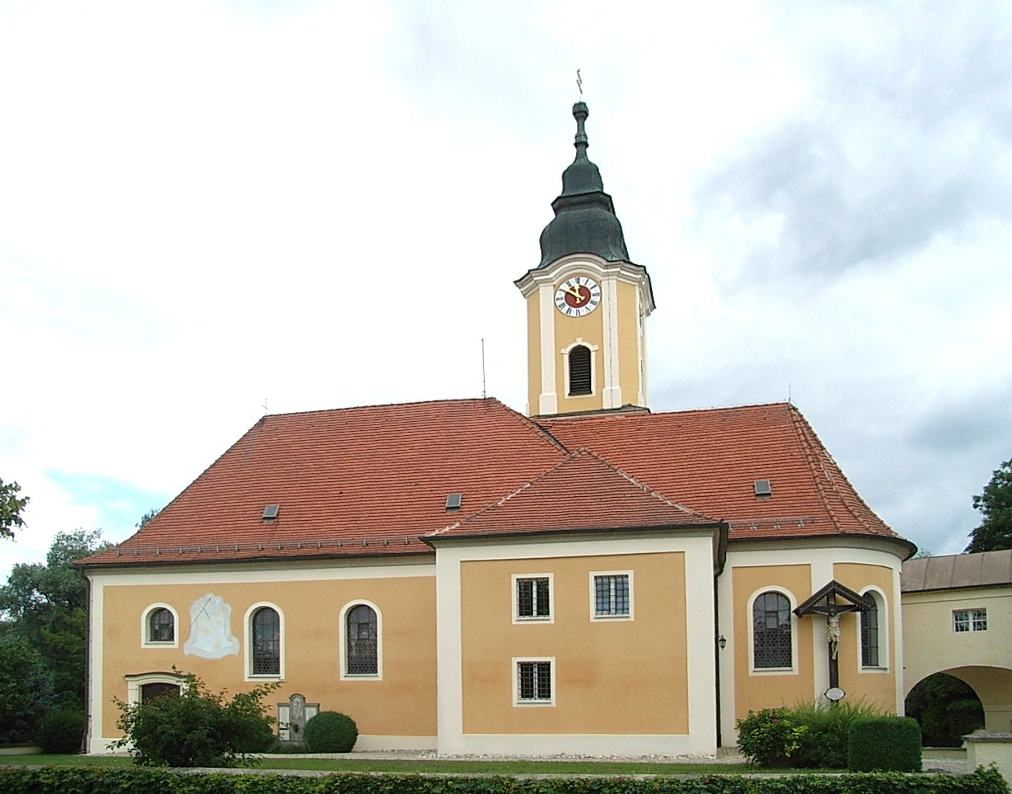
The Roman Catholic parish church

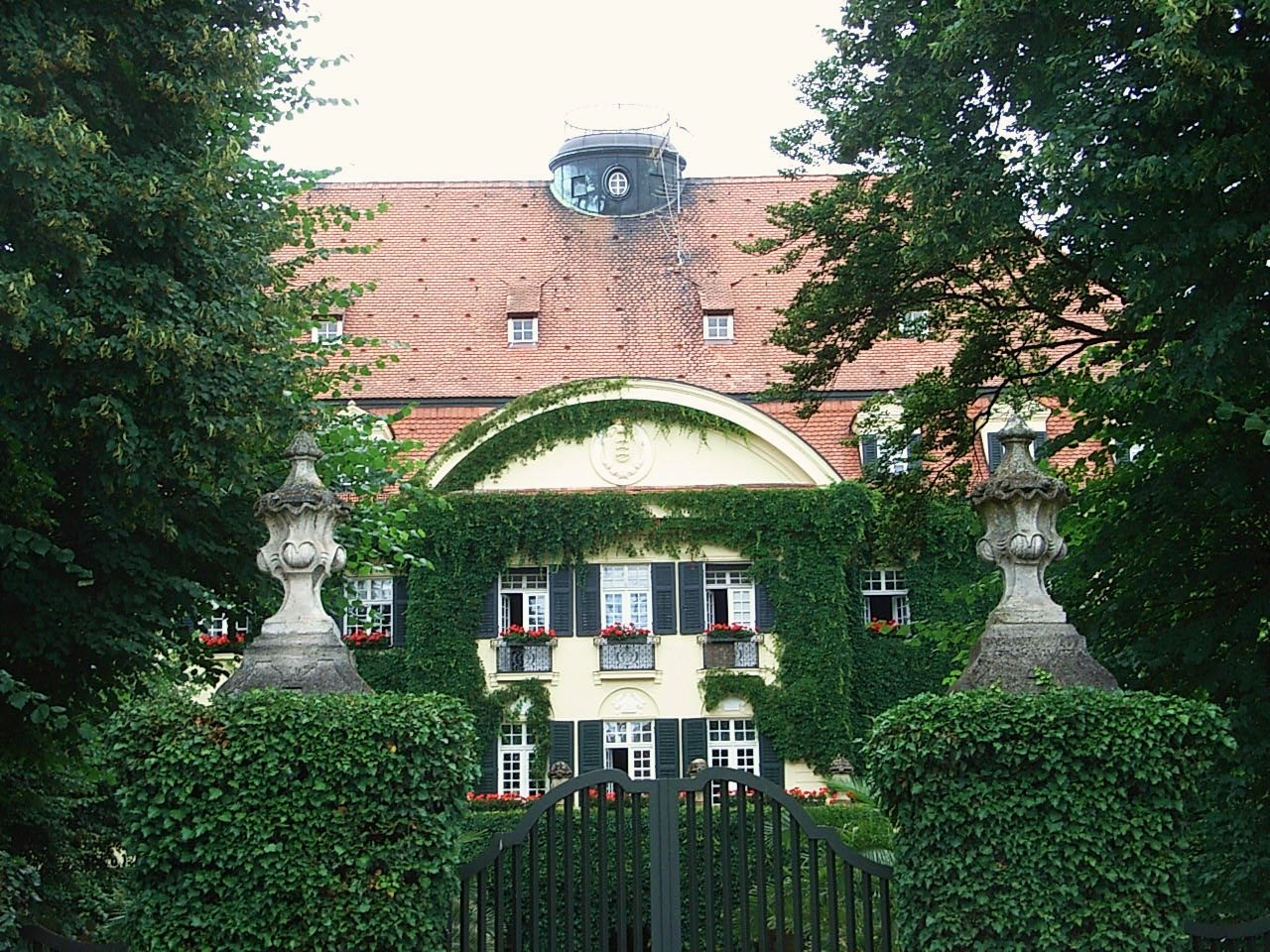
View of the castle

Adldorf is a village in the municipality of Eichendorf in Dingolfing-Landau district of Germany.

It lies on the River Vils to the west of Eichendorf. The ducal fiefs (Lehen) of Arlendorf or Arldorf and Adeldorf were conferred during the course of the centuries to various vassals. In the middle of the 18th century the substantial estate came into the hands of the von Tattenbach counts from Baumgarten. After the death of the Electoral Minister, Count Max Joseph von Tattenbach in 1802, Count Heinrich von Tattenbach, the representative of another branch of the family, inherited the estate.

When he died on 3 October 1821 without any children, he bequeathed Adldorf, including its brewery founded in 1671, in his last will and testament to his nephew Maximilian von Arco. In 1854 the Arcos were given the title auf Valley.

The castle was burnt down in 1836 and again on 31 December 1906. It received its present form when it was rebuilt in 1907. It remains to this day in the ownership of the family, as does the count's brewery, the Arco Valley brewery.

Immediately next to the castle is the parish church of St Mary of the Immaculate Conception (Maria Unbefleckte Empfängnis) built in 1736. The chapelry (Expositur) of Adldorf was founded in 1616, elevated to a parish in 1921 and incorporated into the Eichendorf team ministry (Pfarrverband) in 1963.

From 1808 to the regional reorganisation of 1973, Adldorf was an independent municipality. Its shooting club, Freischütz Adldorf, was founded in 1881. Adldorf had its own station on the Aufhausen–Kröhstorf railway opened in 1915.

== Sources ==
- Joseph Klämpfl: Der ehemalige Schweinach- und Quinzinggau. Eine historisch-topographische Beschreibung, 1855, Nachdruck 1993, Neue Presse Verlags-GmbH, Passau, ISBN 3-924484-73-2
