= Ruppertskirchen =

Ruppertskirchen may refer to the following villages in Bavaria:

- Ruppertskirchen (Altomünster) in the municipality of Altomünster in the Upper Bavarian county of Dachau
- Ruppertskirchen (Arnstorf) in the municipality of Arnstorf, in the Lower Bavarian county of Rottal-Inn
