= Große Vils =

River in Germany

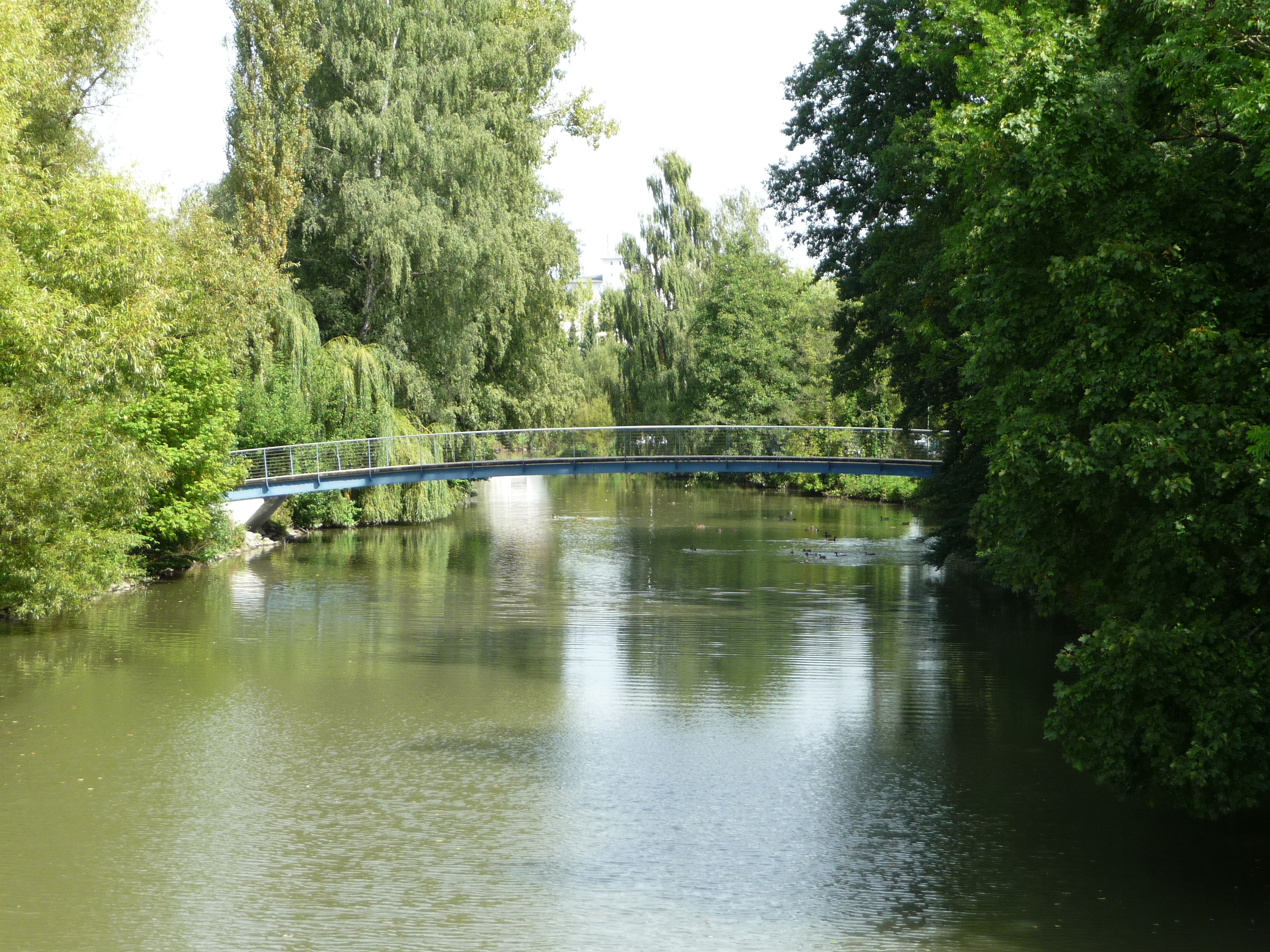
- The Große Vils in Vilsbiburg

Location
- Country: Germany
- State: Bavaria

Physical characteristics
- Mouth
  - location: Vils
  - coordinates: 48.4969°N 12.4225°E
- Length: 45.9 km (28.5 mi)
- Basin size: 348 km (216 mi)

Basin features
- Progression: Vils→ Danube→ Black Sea

Große Vils is a river of Bavaria, Germany. At its confluence with the Kleine Vils near Gerzen, the Vils is formed.

== See also ==
- List of rivers of Bavaria
