= Schloss Mariakirchen =

Castle in Germany

Coordinates: 48.5758°N 12.8614°E

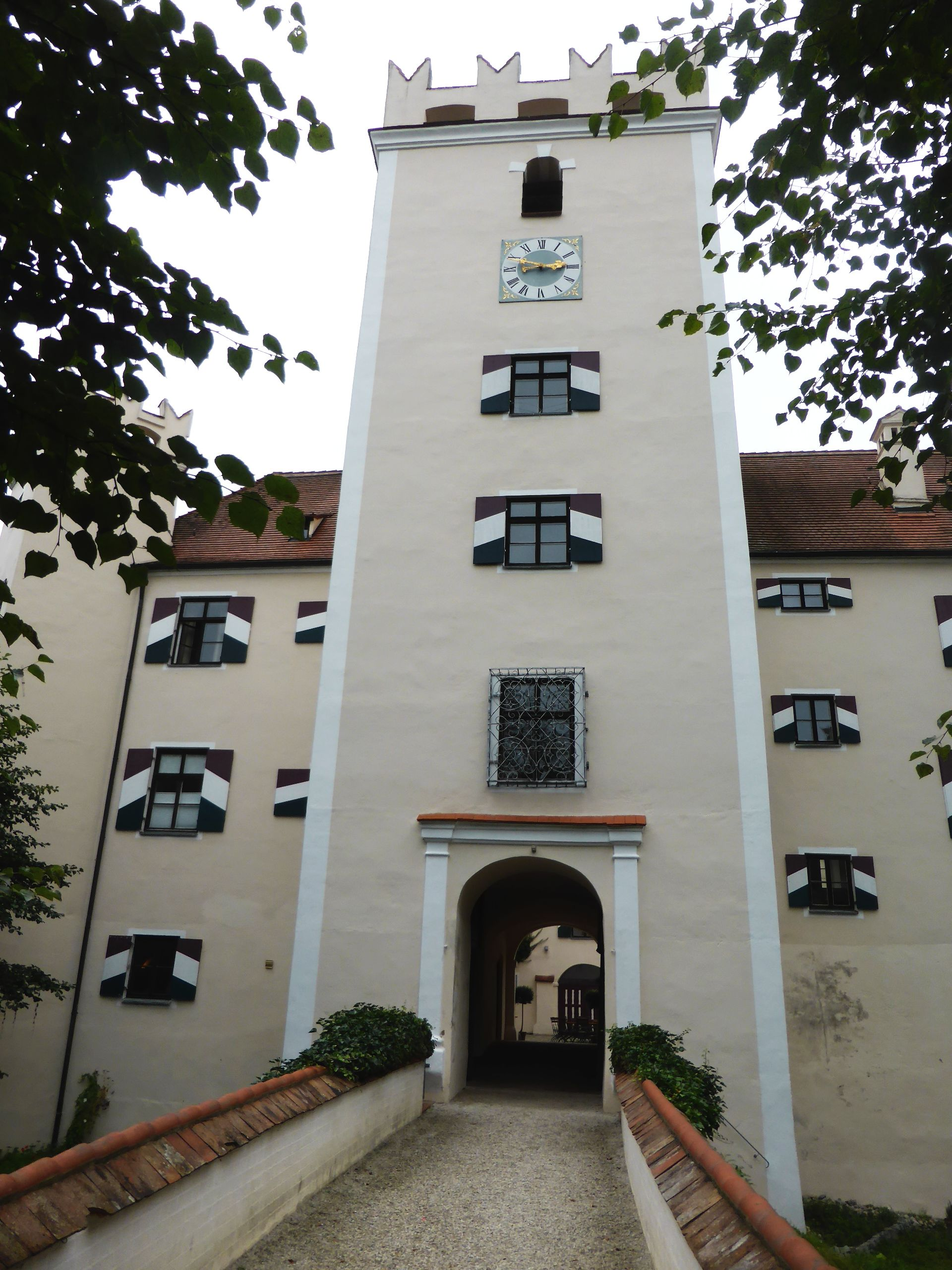
Schloss Mariakirchen, Torturm

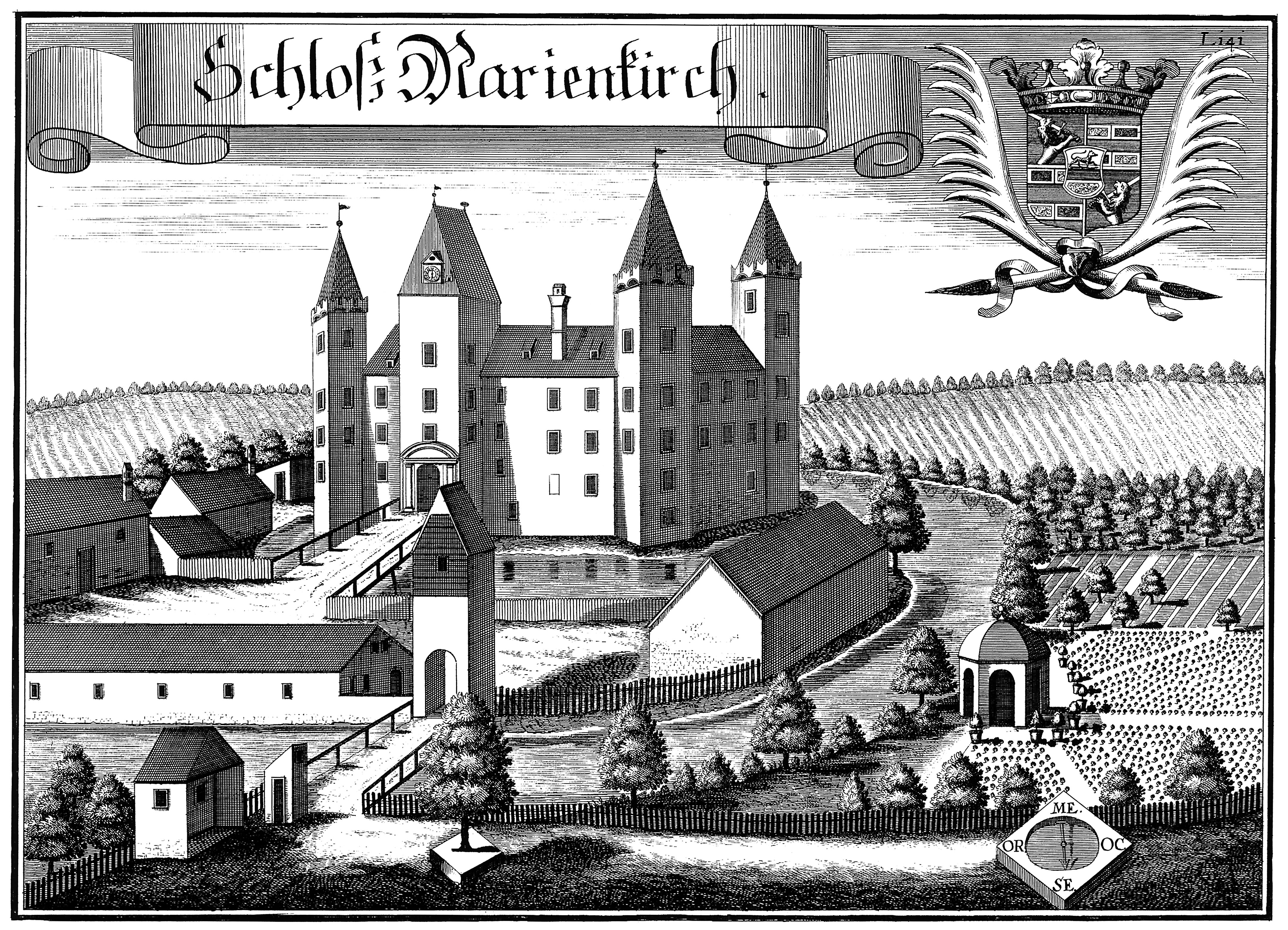
Michael Wening: engraving, c. 1701

Schloss Mariakirchen is a water castle in Hofmarkt Mariakirchen, Arnstorf, Landkreis Rottal-Inn, Bavaria, Germany. It was built in 1550 by Georg von Closen and Barbara von Notthafft.

The castle is a registered historic building and is now mostly used as a venue for events.

About 100 yards away, a hotel building (Schlossparkhotel Mariakirchen) was erected in 2007.^{Official website} A Bavarian restaurant with beergarden is situated In front of the entrance.

== See also ==
- List of castles in Bavaria

== Literature ==
- Ilse Louis: Pfarrkirchen. Die Pfleggerichte Reichenberg und Julbach und die Herrschaft Ering-Frauenstein. (= Historischer Atlas von Bayern, Teil Altbayern, Heft 31). Verlag Michael Laßleben, München, 1973 (S. 273–278). ISBN 3 7696 9878 9.
