= Aufhausen–Kröhstorf railway =

Railway line in southern Germany

Aufhausen–Kröhstorf
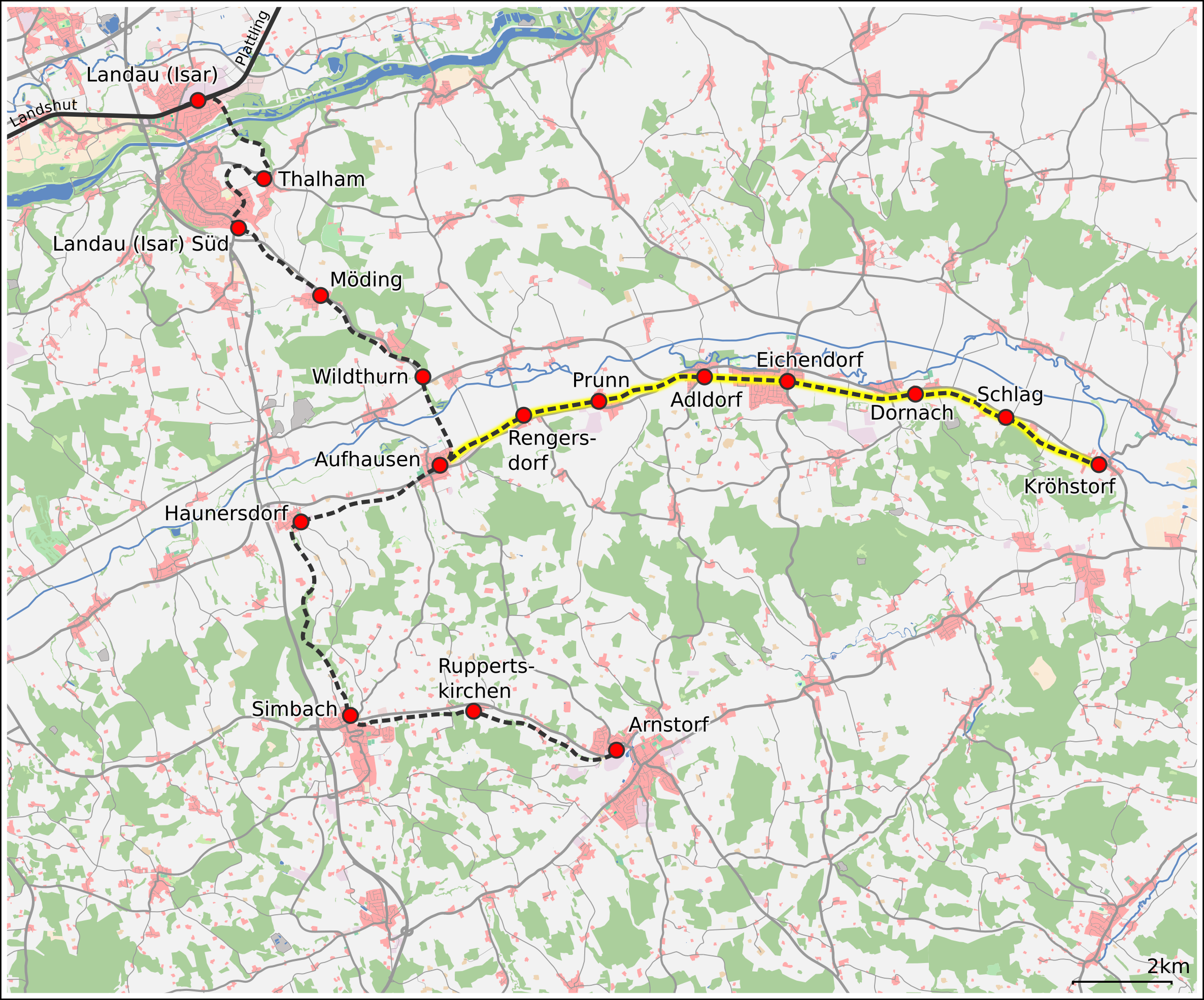

Overview
- Line number: 5641

Technical
- Line length: 14.58 km (9.06 mi)
- Track gauge: 1,435 mm (4.708 ft)

The Aufhausen–Kröhstorf railway was a branch line in the province of Lower Bavaria in southern Germany. The entire course of this former railway ran on what is today the municipality of Markt Eichendorf.

== Early history and construction ==
Following the opening of the Landau–Arnstorf railway in 1903, Eichendorf, which was still without a railway connexion, pressed for the construction of a stub line to Plattling. This was turned down, however, by the Royal Bavarian State Railways on the grounds that it would be uneconomic. As a result, Eichendorf, then a market town of 1,300 inhabitants, endeavoured to have a railway line to Aufhausen. The Minister of Transport in Munich not only supported this application, but went further and pushed through an extension of this planned line to Kröhstorf, in order to open up most of the valley of the River Vils. Eichendorf was thus given an intermediate station on this route.

On 26 June 1908 the Lokalbahn law was passed which authorized the Aufhausen–Kröhstorf railway. With a cost estimate of only 820,600 goldmarks it was one of the cheapest Bavarian branch lines. Its route on the sand, gravel and clay soils along the Vils was straightforward enough and only near Dorto did it have to cross the Petzenbach stream on a 6-metre-long (20 ft) bridge.

In spite of that the starting date for the construction of the line was delayed due to drawn-out negotiations over the purchase of land and it was not until 4 August 1913 that work began on the excavations. On 1 August 1914 activity came to a complete standstill due to mobilization for the First World War and only recommenced on 1 October 1914. Further delays to deliveries caused by the war meant that it was not until 9 November 1915 that the first train was able to work the line.

== Operations ==
The railway was never profitable. Its junction at Aufhausen was unfortunate because it was so configured that it trains had to enter the main line to Landau against the normal direction of trains on that line, which ruled out the possibility of through trains from Landau to Kröhstorf. Plans to extend the little Lokalbahn by 11.8 km through the Vils Valley to Aldersbach to join the Vilshofen–Aidenbach railway never came to fruition.

After the Second World War 400 broken down steam engines from the occupied territories were stored here. In the firehole of an old goods locomotive the mummified body of a former German soldier was discovered. It is suspected that he had run away from his unit and found a hiding place in the engine, but was unable to re-open the door from inside.

In 1953, 30,173 tickets were sold and 698 goods wagon loads dispatched. In 1957 ticket sales had fallen to 13,223, but goods traffic had risen by about 400 wagon loads.

== Closure ==
On 1 July 1962 the Deutsche Bundesbahn withdrew passenger services from the line and transferred them to the road. The last journey on the line took place on 22 May 1971. On that day diesel locomotive no. 212 239-8 hauled two D-Zug coaches with 82 passengers, including 68 school children from the Volksschule Eichendorf, and a luggage van. On 23 May 1971 the whole route was closed and in March 1973 it was dismantled. Today it has become the Vils Valley Cycle Way.

== See also ==
- Royal Bavarian State Railways
- Bavarian branch lines
- List of closed railway lines in Bavaria

== Sources ==
- Walther Zeitler (1985), Eisenbahnen in Niederbayern und in der Oberpfalz (in German), Weiden: Buch & Kunstverlag Oberpfalz, ISBN 3-924350-01-9
