= Vilsbiburg =

- Town
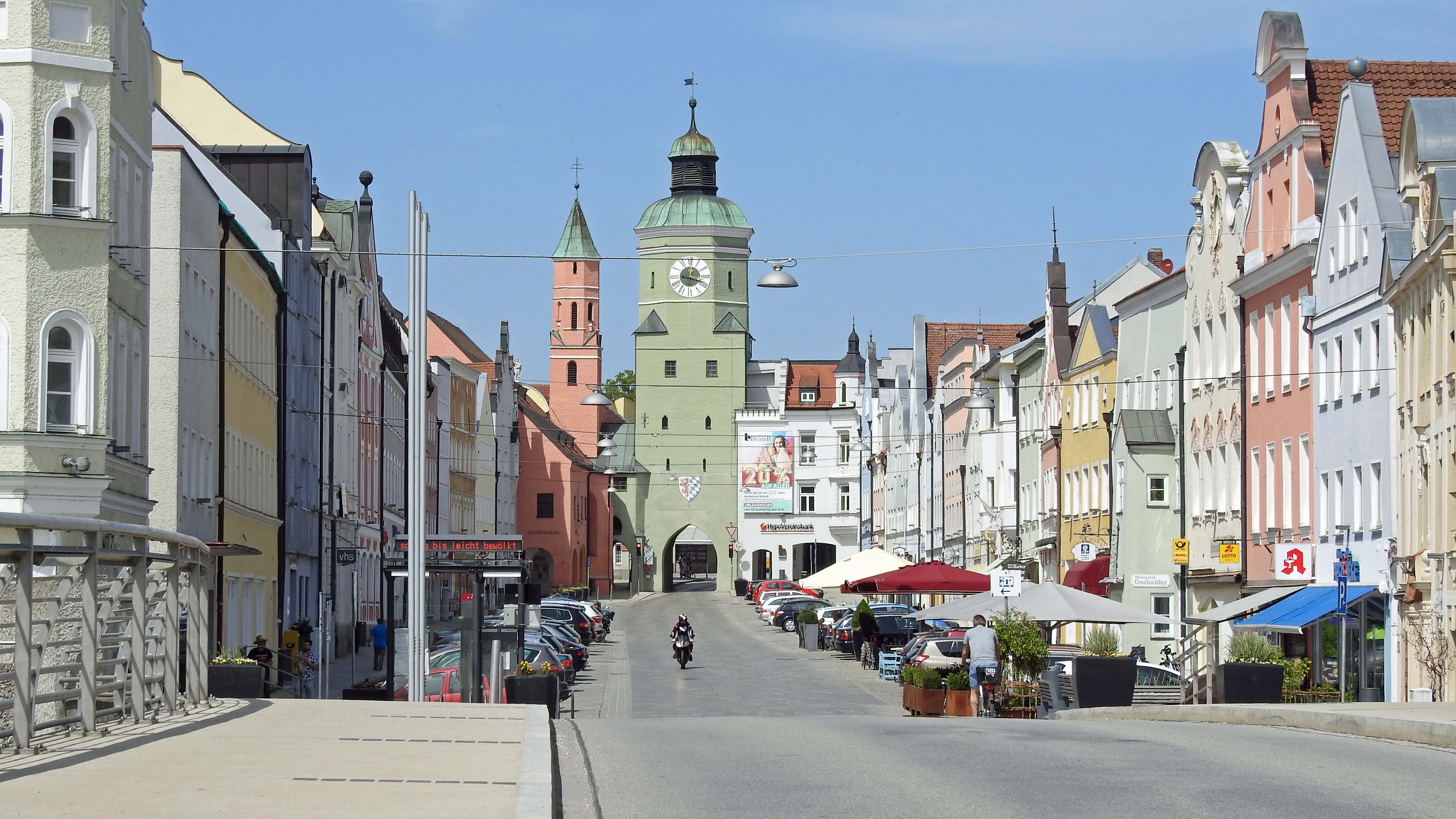
- Town square

- Coat of arms

- Location of Vilsbiburg within Landshut district
- Interactive map of Vilsbiburg
- Location within Germany Location within Bavaria
- Coordinates: 48°27′N 12°21′E
- Country: Germany
- State: Bavaria
- Admin. region: Lower Bavaria
- District: Landshut

Government
  - Mayor (2020–26): Sibylle Entwistle (SPD)

Area
  - Total: 68.84 km^{2} (26.58 sq mi)
- Elevation: 449 m (1,473 ft)

Population (2025-12-31)
  - Total: 12,205
  - Density: 177.3/km^{2} (459.2/sq mi)
- Time zone: UTC+01:00 (CET)
  - Summer (DST): UTC+02:00 (CEST)
- Postal codes: 84137
- Dialling codes: 08741
- Vehicle registration: LA, VIB
- Website: www.vilsbiburg.de

Vilsbiburg (German pronunciation: [fɪlsˈbiːbʊʁk], regional: Vib [fɪb]) is a town on the river Große Vils, 18 km southeast of Landshut, in the district of Landshut, in Bavaria, Germany. The city owes its name to the river Große Vils which runs through Vilsbiburg. As of 2019 Vilsbiburg has 12,203 inhabitants.

== Geography ==
Vilsbiburg lies in the center of Lower Bavaria and is part of the Alpine foothills. The river Vils runs through the town center. Vilsbiburg is about 55 miles northeast of Munich.

== History ==
=== 10th to 18th Century ===
The first mention of a village named Pipurch is found around 1000 AD. In records dating back to 1308, Vilsbiburg is mentioned as a market and also as a town, having a court and municipal powers. In 1648 more than half of the city's population died due to a plague epidemic. In 1760 the administrative office of the Pfleger of Geisenhausen, which was ancillary to the Rentamt of Landshut, was transferred to Vilsbiburg. Henceforth, Vilsbiburg held a market court with its own magistral powers.

=== 19th and 20th Century ===
In 1803 Vilsbiburg received a section of the Landgericht Teisbach. As a consequence of administrative reform of Bavaria in the Gemeindeedikt von 1818 Vilsbiburg was officially recognized as a municipality.

Vilsbiburg officially acquired the status of a town in 1929. On July 1, 1972 the administrative district of Vilsbiburg was merged into Landshut. The former municipalities of Frauensattling, Gaindorf, Haarbach, Seyboldsdorf and Wolferding became part of the town of Vilsbiburg in 1978.

=== Mayors ===
The current mayor is Sibylle Entwistle (SPD), elected in March 2020.

Former mayors:

- 1960–1990: Josef Billinger, SPD
- 1990–1996: Peter Barteit, SPD
- 1996–2020: Helmut Haider, Free voters

== International relations ==
Vilsbiburg is twinned with:

- Buja, Italy, since 2001

== Notable people ==
- Florian Gruber (born 1983), racing driver
- Markus Karl (born 1986), footballer SV Sandhausen
- Gisela Stuart (born 1955), British MP 1997-2017
- Florian Oßner (born 1980), politician

== See also ==
- Rote Raben Vilsbiburg, volleyball team
