= Reisbach (Vils) =

- Municipality
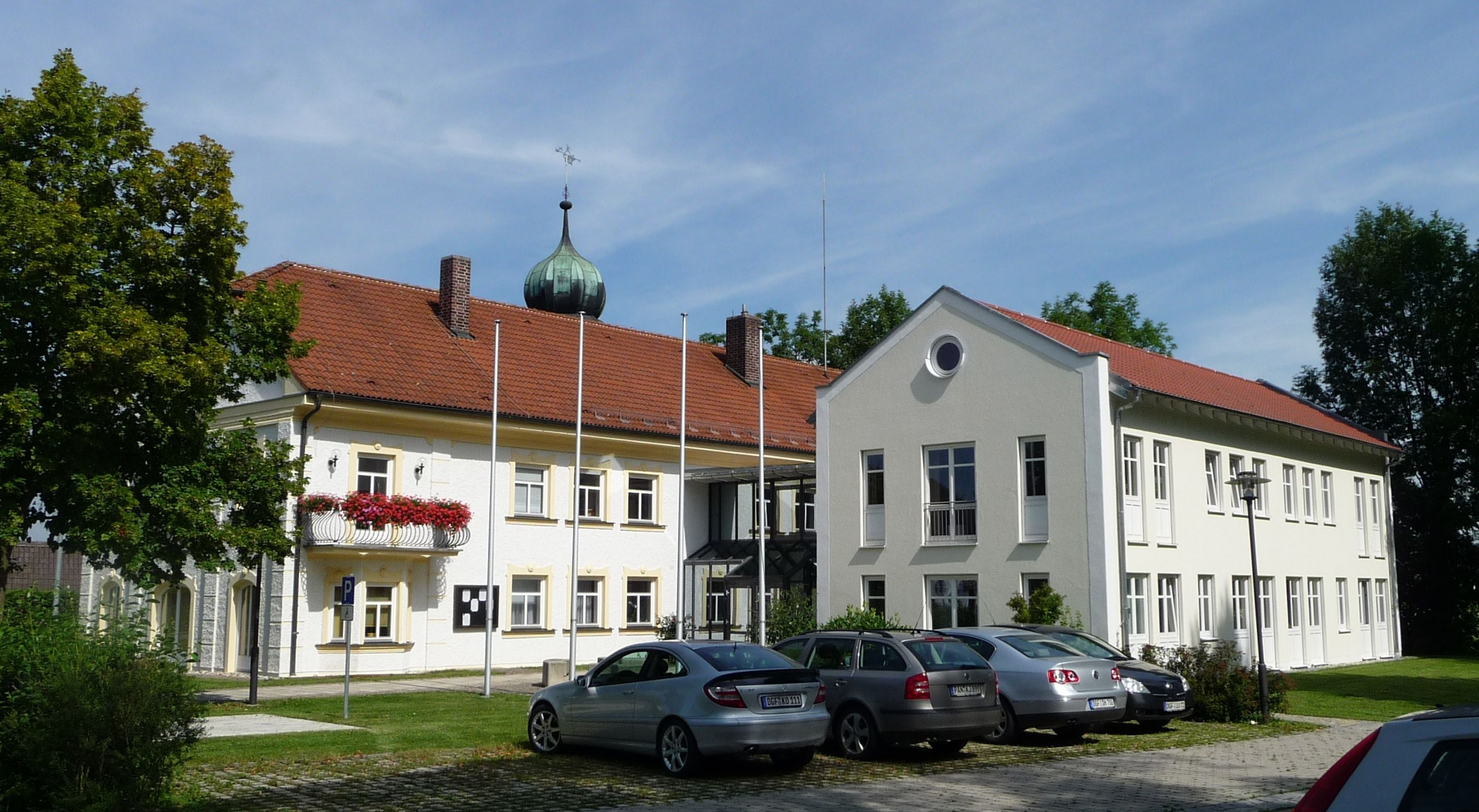
- Town hall

- Coat of arms

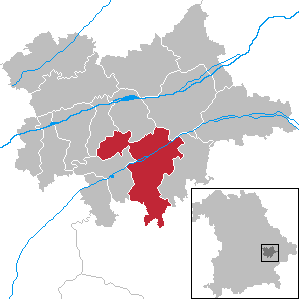
- Location of Reisbach within Dingolfing-Landau district
- Interactive map of Reisbach
- Location within Germany Location within Bavaria
- Coordinates: 48°34′N 12°38′E
- Country: Germany
- State: Bavaria
- Admin. region: Niederbayern
- District: Dingolfing-Landau
- Subdivisions: 7 Ortsteile

Government
  - Mayor (2020–26): Rolf-Peter Holzleitner (FW)

Area
  - Total: 94.16 km^{2} (36.36 sq mi)
- Elevation: 408 m (1,339 ft)

Population (2025-12-31)
  - Total: 7,673
  - Density: 81.49/km^{2} (211.1/sq mi)
- Time zone: UTC+01:00 (CET)
  - Summer (DST): UTC+02:00 (CEST)
- Postal codes: 94419
- Dialling codes: 08734 08735 (Bachham)
- Vehicle registration: DGF
- Website: www.reisbach.de

Reisbach is a market town in Bavaria. It lies on the Vils River, and belongs to the administrative region of Niederbayern.

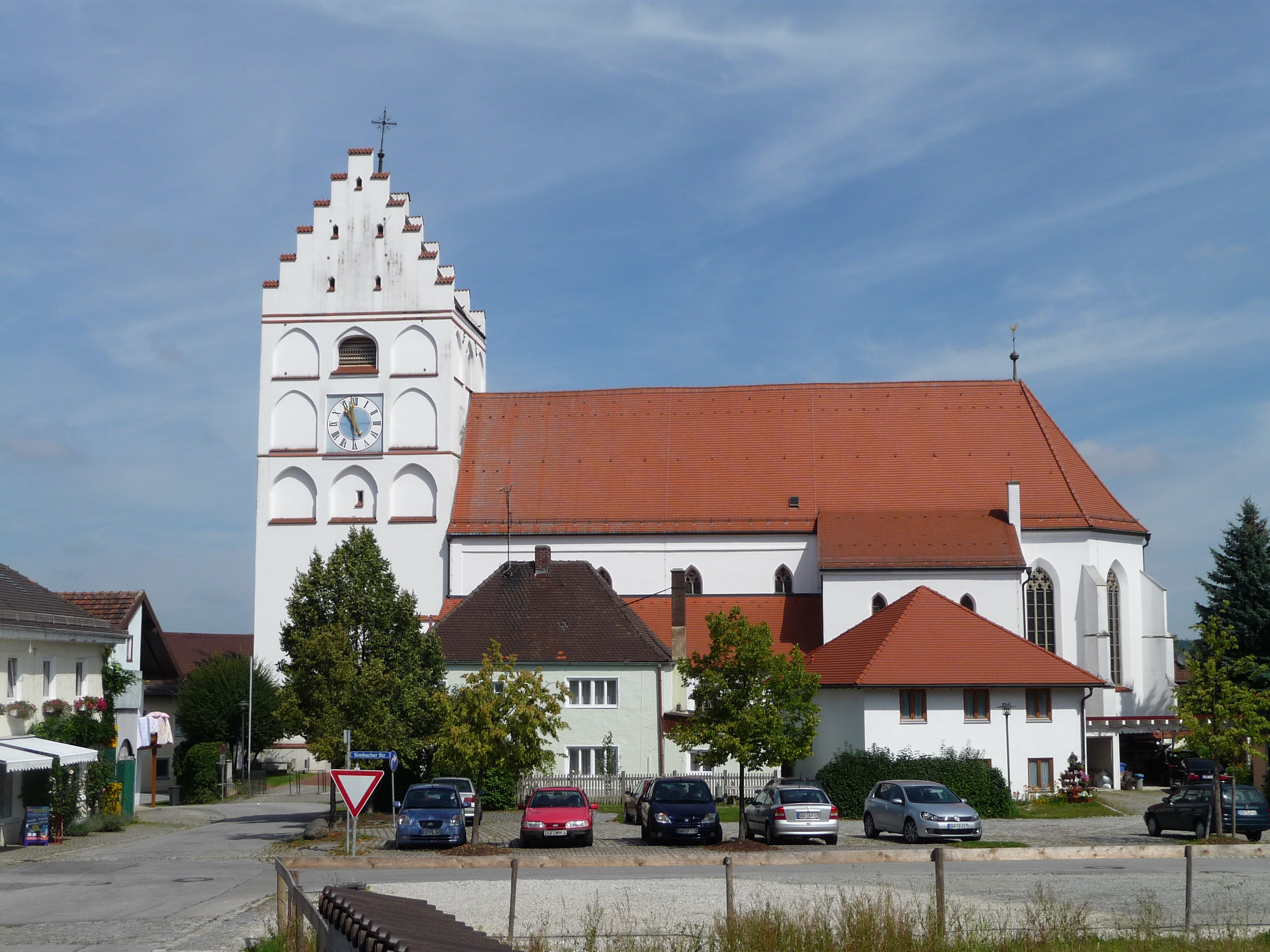
Church of St. Michael

== Neighbouring communities ==
The neighbouring communities, listed clockwise, are Mamming, Landau an der Isar, Simbach (bei Landau), Falkenberg (Niederbayern), Rimbach (Niederbayern), Gangkofen, Marklkofen and Gottfrieding.

== Populated places ==
- Englmannsberg
- Griesbach
- Niederhausen
- Oberhausen
- Obermünchsdorf
- Reith
- Thannenmais
