= Kleine Vils =

River in Germany

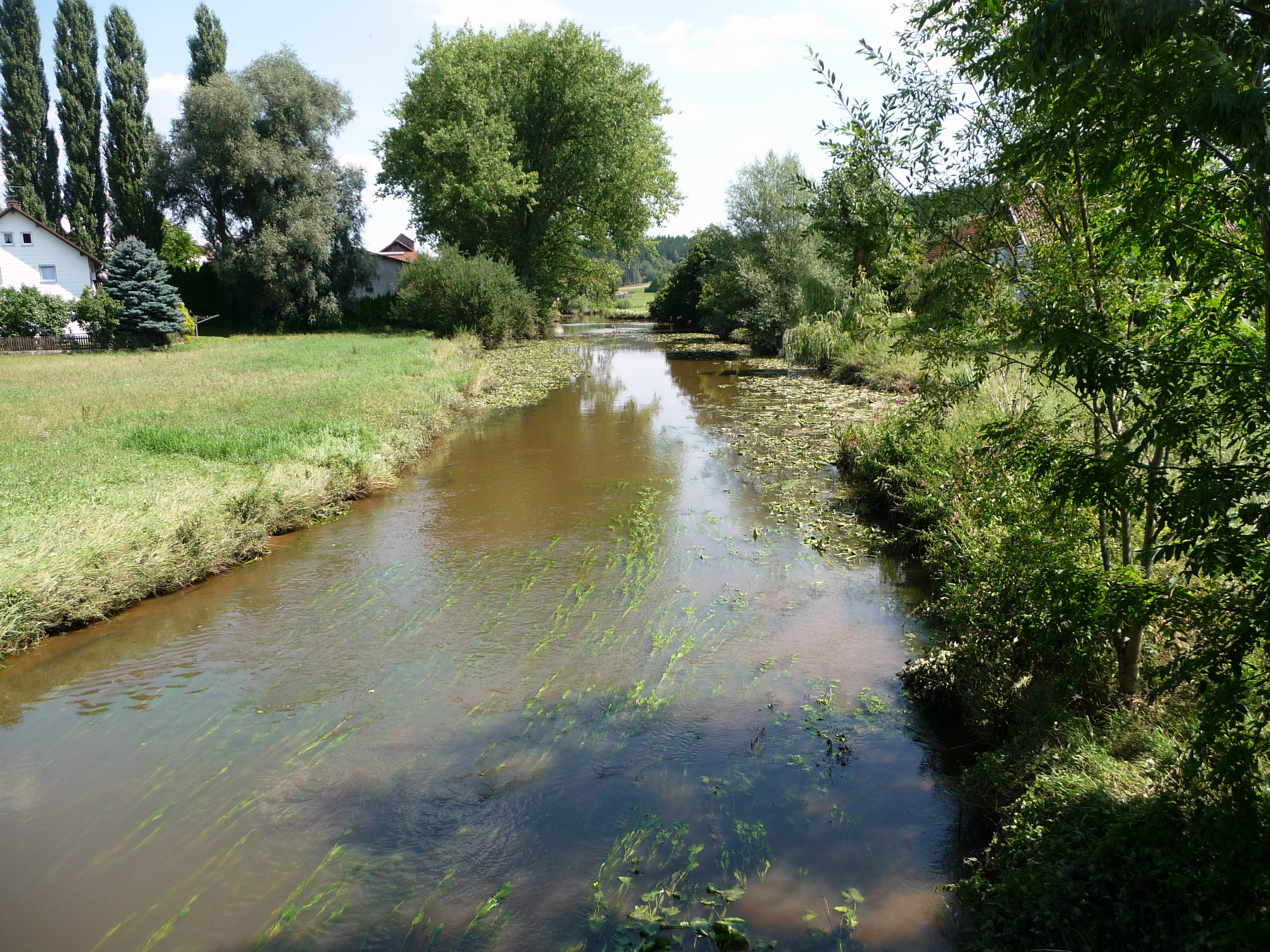
- The Kleine Vils at Vilssattling, Gerzen

Location
- Country: Germany
- State: Bavaria

Physical characteristics
- Mouth
  - location: Vils
  - coordinates: 48.4969°N 12.4225°E
- Length: 38.1 km (23.7 mi)
- Basin size: 175 km (109 mi)

Basin features
- Progression: Vils→ Danube→ Black Sea

Kleine Vils (in its upper course: Krumbächlein) is a river of Bavaria, Germany. At its confluence with the Große Vils near Gerzen, the Vils is formed.

== See also ==
- List of rivers of Bavaria
