= Johannes Baader =

German architect, writer

- Born: June 21, 1875; Stuttgart, Germany
- Died: January 14, 1955 (aged 79)

Johannes Baader (June 21, 1875 – January 14, 1955), originally trained as an architect, was a German writer and artist associated with Dada in Berlin.

== Life ==
Baader was born in Stuttgart, where his father worked as a metalworker at the royal buildings. Johannes' education began at the Stuttgart trade school from 1892 to 1895 and continued at the technical college. His first job was as a stonemason in Dresden cutting gravestones. In 1905 after moving to Berlin, he met Raoul Hausmann. Together they would become influential figures at the heart of Berlin Dada. In 1906 he designed a World Temple, a utopian vision of interdenominational harmony. It took numerous forms as inspiration, including Greek and Indian archetypes. In common with many utopian architectural projects of the time, the building—which was to be 1500m high—remained unbuilt and exists only in the form of sketches and writings. 1911–12 saw him produce designs for an unbuilt zoo for Carl Hagenbeck.

In 1914, Baader's written output began to increase. He published a treatise, Vierzehn Briefe Christi (Fourteen Letters of Christ) concerning Monism and over the course of the next few years wrote articles for the journals Die freie Straße (The Free Street) and Der Dada. In 1917 in the midst of the First World War, he was certified legally insane as a result of manic depression. Now equipped with considerable license, he gave outrageous public performances parodying public and mythic identities and producing utopian designs of monumental, metaphysical, and messianic dimensions. In the same year he ran for office in the Reichstag in Saarbrücken. He would later become a leader in the German political party known as The Central Council of Dada for the World Revolution. Raoul Hausmann appointed him head of a society called Christus GmbH (Christ Ltd), which he formally founded as a legal company in 1917. Hausmann explained that the plan was to recruit persons to join the society for 50 marks, after which the member could too become Christ and would be unfit for military service and free from all temporal authority. Attempts were made to equate conscientious objection with Christian martyrdom. He became the centre of a scandal on November 17, 1918, after giving a performance in Berlin Cathedral entitled "Christus ist euch Wurst" (“you don’t give a damn about Christ” or literally “Christ is sausage to you”) which disrupted the sermon of former Court Chaplain Dryander. From the choir loft above Baader is reported to have shouted either “You are the ones who mock Christ, you don’t give a damn about him” or “To hell with Christ!” This mocking of the clergy, laity and politicians and resulted in his brief arrest. In 1918, he declared he had been resurrected as the Oberdada, the president of the universe, really a Dadaist parody of a high-ranking military figure. He wrote Die acht Weltsätze (Eight World Theses), a quasi-religious tract in the same year.

Further explanations of his 'cosmic identity' were expounded in collages such as Dada Milchstrasse (Dada Milky Way, 1919) and written pieces. Raoul Hausmann, Baader's friend and collaborator, credits him with being the first to having created giant collage art, which he produced from life-size posters and used in his direct action campaigns, after which he destroyed them. Perhaps his most infamous direct action occurred at the inaugural ceremony for the first German republic, held in 1919 at the Weimar Theater. Baader threw down home-made flyers from the balcony onto the heads of the founding politicians. These flyers, the title of which in English would read “The Green Horse”, nominated himself as the new governmentʼs President. Hans Richter considered Baader to be the “crowbar” of the Berlin Dada Movement and the only member capable of carrying out their resistance movement with maximum publicity. Richter wrote of him: “For sheer lack of inhibition he put in the shade even the activities of Dadaists in Zurich, New York, Berlin, and Paris; and this is saying a great deal... He was the furtherest removed from normality (and therefore convention) of them all.”

Attempts to initiate a Dada architecture resulted in his Das Grosse Plasto-Dio-Dada-Drama: Deutschlands Grösse und Untergang oder Die phantastische Lebensgeschichte des Oberdada (The Great Plasto-Dio-Dada-Drama: Germany's Greatness and Decline or The Fantastic Life of the Superdada), originally shown in 1920 at the Berlin Erste internationale Dada-Messe (First International Dada Fair). This unique artwork, part national history, part personal biography, now survives only through photographs and is considered, according to Helen Adkins, to be “definitely the first assemblage-environment in the history of art”. Hanna Bergius classifies this entirely new art form as démontage, given it deconstructive essence. Baader also produced sketches of visionary architecture, which, in common with those of Hausmann and Yefim Golïshev, sometimes invoked proto-Constructivist girderlike structures. In 1919 exactly a year after the abdication of the Kaiser, Baader printed calling cards proclaiming he was President of the Earth and Universe. He applied to teach at Gropius's Bauhaus with these qualifications. An unimpressed Gropius declined.

Baader died in 1955, in a home for the elderly in Adldorf, Germany at age 79.
