= Gerzen (Verwaltungsgemeinschaft) =

- Verwaltungsgemeinschaft
- Location of Gerzen within Landshut district
- Interactive map of Gerzen
- Location within Germany Location within Bavaria
- Coordinates: 48°30′N 12°26′E
- Country: Germany
- State: Bavaria
- Admin. region: Lower Bavaria
- District: Landshut
- Seat: Gerzen
- Subdivisions: 4 municipalities

Area
  - Total: 117.3 km^{2} (45.3 sq mi)

Population (2025-12-31)
  - Total: 6,795
  - Density: 57.93/km^{2} (150.0/sq mi)
- Time zone: UTC+01:00 (CET)
  - Summer (DST): UTC+02:00 (CEST)
- Website: www.gerzen.de

Gerzen is a Verwaltungsgemeinschaft (municipal association) in the district of Landshut in Bavaria, Germany. Its seat is in Gerzen.

It consists of the following municipalities:

1. Aham
2. Gerzen
3. Kröning
4. Schalkham
