= Kröning =

- Municipality
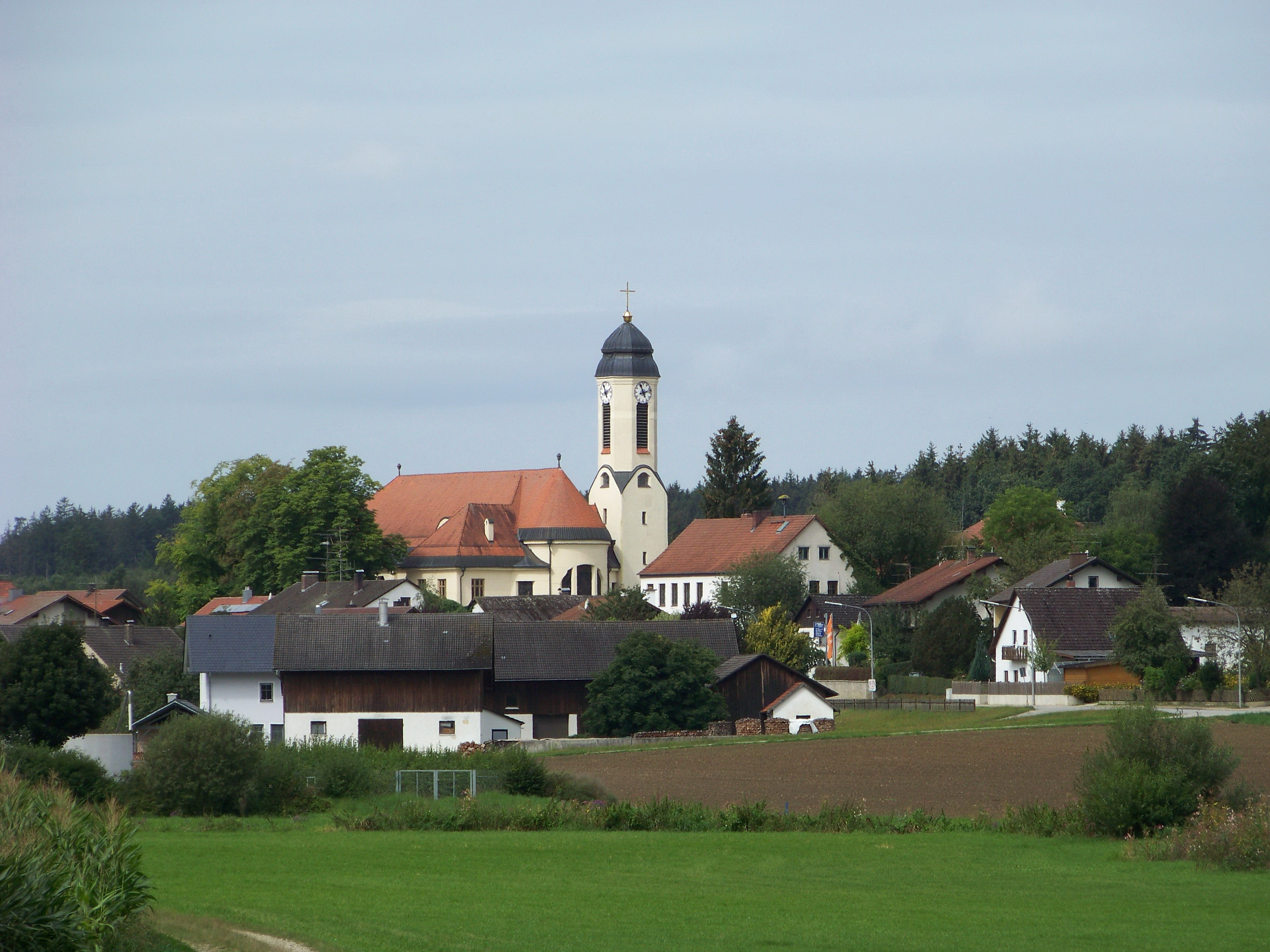
- Church of the Immaculate Conception of the Virgin Mary in Dietelskirchen

- Coat of arms

- Location of Kröning within Landshut district
- Interactive map of Kröning
- Location within Germany Location within Bavaria
- Coordinates: 48°32′N 12°22′E
- Country: Germany
- State: Bavaria
- Admin. region: Niederbayern
- District: Landshut
- Municipal assoc.: Gerzen

Government
  - Mayor (2020–26): Konrad Hartshauser (CSU)

Area
  - Total: 39.6 km^{2} (15.3 sq mi)
- Elevation: 458 m (1,503 ft)

Population (2025-12-31)
  - Total: 2,049
  - Density: 51.7/km^{2} (134/sq mi)
- Time zone: UTC+01:00 (CET)
  - Summer (DST): UTC+02:00 (CEST)
- Postal codes: 84178
- Dialling codes: 08744
- Vehicle registration: LA
- Website: Official website

Kröning (German pronunciation: [ˈkʁøːnɪŋ]) is a municipality in the district of Landshut in Bavaria in Germany.
