= Kollbach =

River in Germany

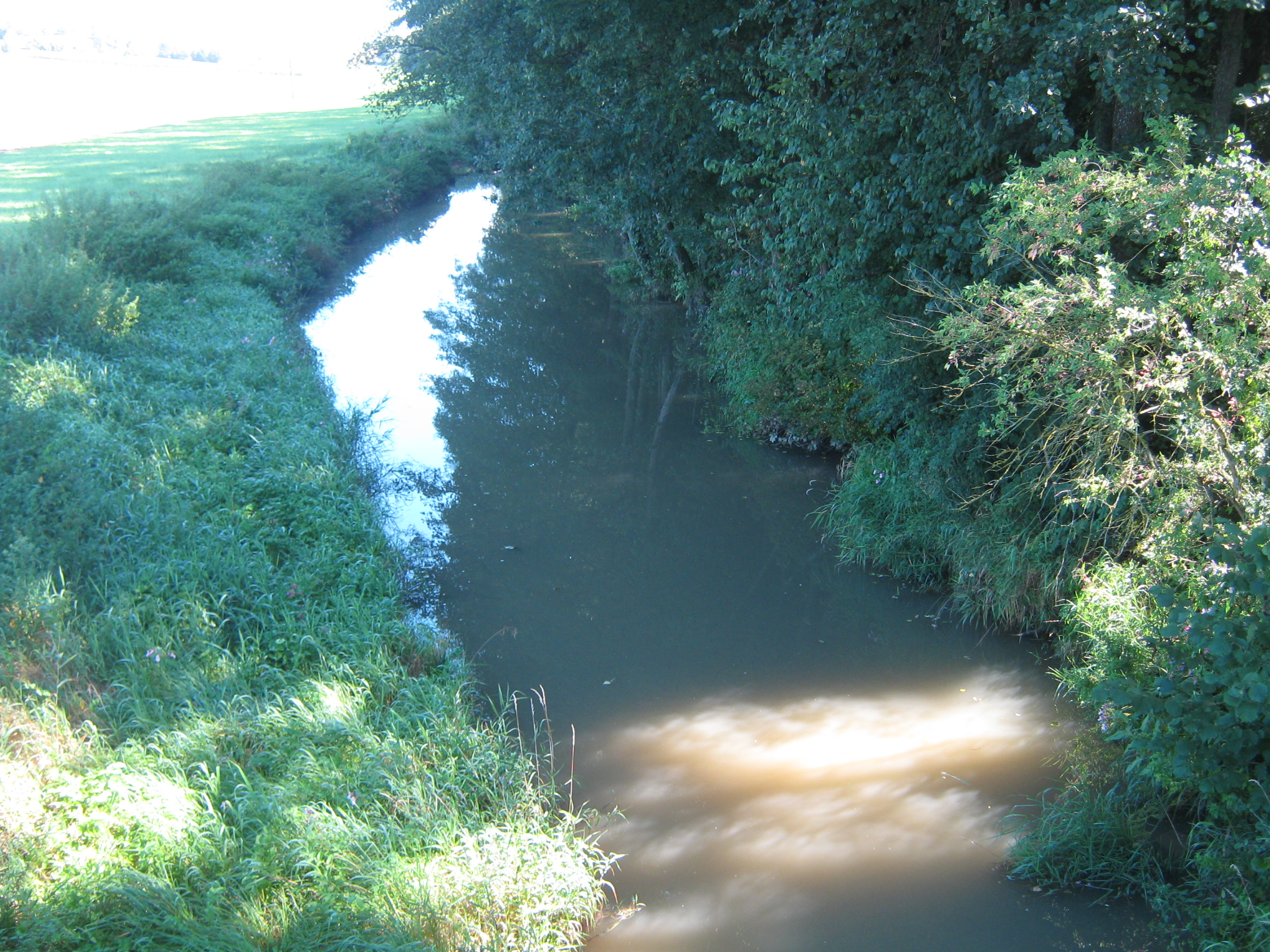
- The Kollbach at Haberskirchen (part of Reisbach)

Location
- Country: Germany
- State: Bavaria

Physical characteristics
- Mouth
  - location: Vilskanal
  - coordinates: 48.6000°N 12.9583°E
- Length: 41.9 km (26.0 mi)
- Basin size: 274 km^{2} (106 sq mi)

Basin features
- Progression: Vils→ Danube→ Black Sea

Kollbach is a river of Bavaria, Germany. It flows into the Vilskanal, an artificial branch of the Vils, near Roßbach.

== See also ==
- List of rivers of Bavaria
