= Malgersdorf =

- Municipality
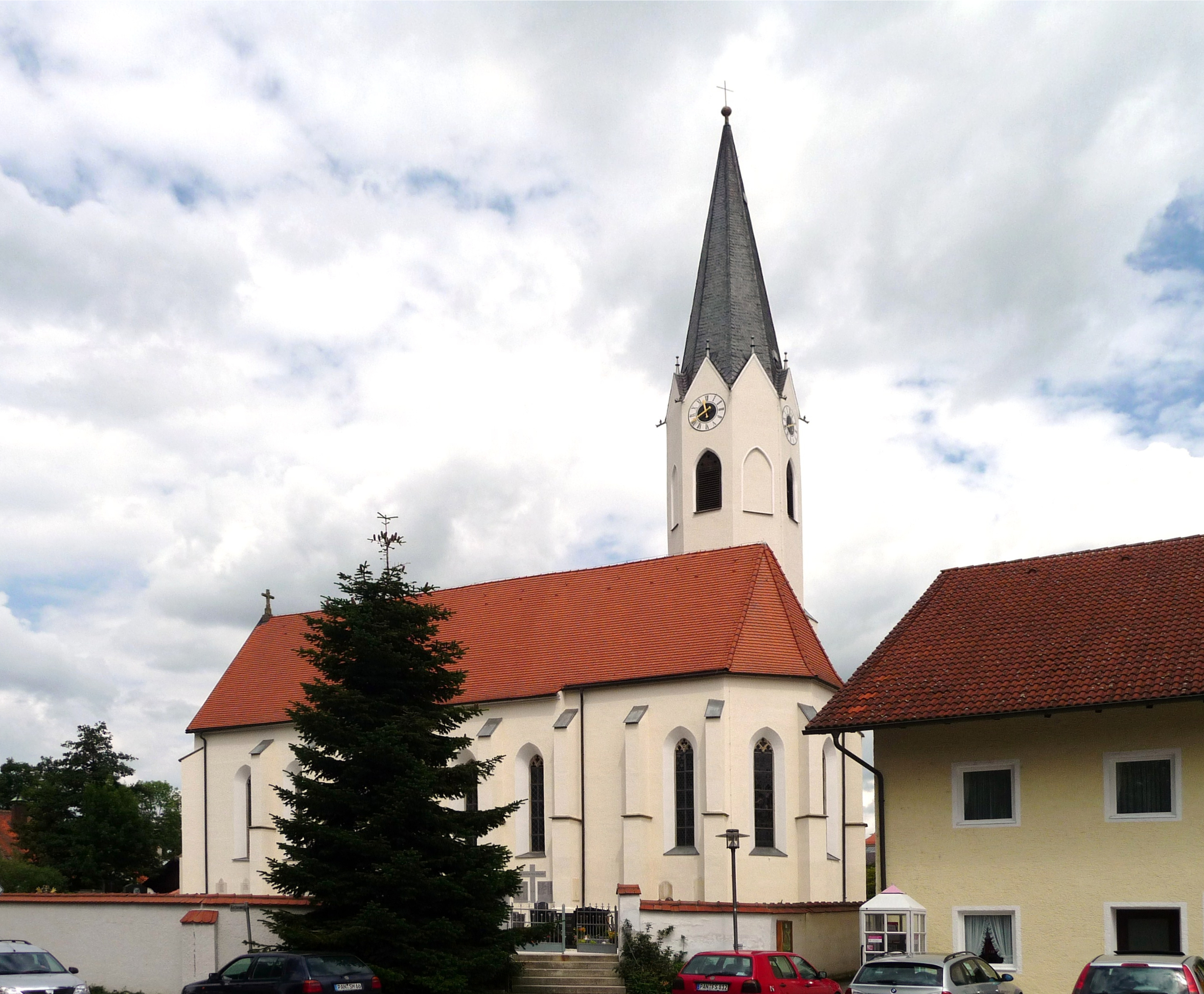
- Church of Saint Stephen

- Coat of arms

- Location of Malgersdorf within Rottal-Inn district
- Interactive map of Malgersdorf
- Location within Germany Location within Bavaria
- Coordinates: 48°31′56″N 12°44′49″E
- Country: Germany
- State: Bavaria
- Admin. region: Niederbayern
- District: Rottal-Inn
- Municipal assoc.: Falkenberg

Government
  - Mayor (2020–26): Franz-Josef Weber

Area
  - Total: 11.48 km^{2} (4.43 sq mi)
- Elevation: 398 m (1,306 ft)

Population (2025-12-31)
  - Total: 1,225
  - Density: 106.7/km^{2} (276.4/sq mi)
- Time zone: UTC+01:00 (CET)
  - Summer (DST): UTC+02:00 (CEST)
- Postal codes: 84333
- Dialling codes: 09954
- Vehicle registration: PAN
- Website: www.malgersdorf.de

Malgersdorf (German pronunciation: [ˈmalɡɐsdɔʁf]) is a municipality in the district of Rottal-Inn in Bavaria in Germany.

== Geography ==
The municipality is located between Landau and Eggenfelden. Part of the municipality of Malgersdorf is located halfway between these two towns (17 km away from each), 26 km southeast of Dingolfing and 25 km northwest of the district town Pfarrkirchen. The main town is by far the largest part of the existing municipality.

The Kollbach river flows through the municipality in a west-east direction.
