= Central Council of Dada for the World Revolution =

The Central Council of Dada for the World Revolution was the name of the political party set up by the Berlin Dada movement following World War I.

The Berlin Dadaists supported the Spartacist rising of 1918-1919, led by Karl Liebknecht and Rosa Luxemburg. When this revolution was crushed and Liebknecht and Luxemburg killed, the Dadas continued to seek power through democratic means. They were present at the Weimar Congress but remained relatively politically powerless throughout the era of the Weimar Republic, during which time they did gain some infamy for their direct action campaigns and artistic innovations.

In Berlin in 1919, the group outlined the Dadaist ideas of radical communism.

Members included: Johannes Baader, Raoul Hausmann, Tristan Tzara, George Grosz, Marcel Janco, Hans Arp, Franz Jung, Eugen Ernst, A.R. Meyer and Richard Huelsenbeck. Their shocking political tactics and social antics influenced many later counter-cultural movements, such as the Youth International Party and the punk rock movement.

== Links and Sources ==
- Dada: Art as weapon against establishment
- Avant-garde of terror
