= Ruppertskirchen (Arnstorf) =

Coordinates: 48°34′19″N 12°46′24″E

- Village
- Location in Germany
- Country: Germany
- State: Bavaria
- District: Rottal-Inn
- Municipality: Arnstorf

Population
  - Total: ~20

Ruppertskirchen is a village in the municipality of Arnstorf in Rottal-Inn district in the province of Lower Bavaria in southern Germany. Ruppertskirchen lies on the Simbach stream between Arnstorf and Simbach bei Landau on state highway 2112. Before the regional reorganisation in Bavaria in 1972 Ruppertskirchen was an independent municipality with 42 subdivisions. At that time Ruppertskirchen was the largest municipality in present-day Markt Arnstorf and, in terms of area, the largest in the old district of Eggenfelden. It had a railway halt on the old Landau–Arnstorf railway.

Ruppertskirchen itself has 9 houses, with just under 20 inhabitants, and a pub. The name goes back to Rueperskhürchen (settlement near the Church of St. Rupert) mentioned as early as 1614. The church in Ruppertskirchen, like the village, is named in honour of St. Rupert. Its predecessor, a late Roman structure, was built in the 13th century and was originally called St. Lampertus.

The road through Ruppertskirchen is named after the last mayor of the municipality of Ruppertskirchen, Peter Huber from Siegerstorf.

The following villages belonged to the former municipality of Ruppertskirchen:

Aicha, Altmannskinden, Asbach, Bergham, Blumdorf, Bruckbach, Bruckmühle, Dingelsberg, Döttenberg, Eck, Ed, Eiselstorf, Freising, Furtschneid, Grafendorf, Hag, Holz, Kattenberg, Kolmöd, Kornöd, Lindach, Mühlberg, Niederlucken, Nömer, Picklöd, Puch, Püchl, Raisting, Reitberg, Schröttendorf, Sendllmeier, Sichenpoint, Siegerstorf, Sommerstorf, Staudach, Steindorf, Stelzenöd, Stockahausen, Volkstorf, Zenzlhub, Zwilling.

Ruppertskirchen Volunteer Fire Service
