= Aham, Germany =

Aham
- Municipality
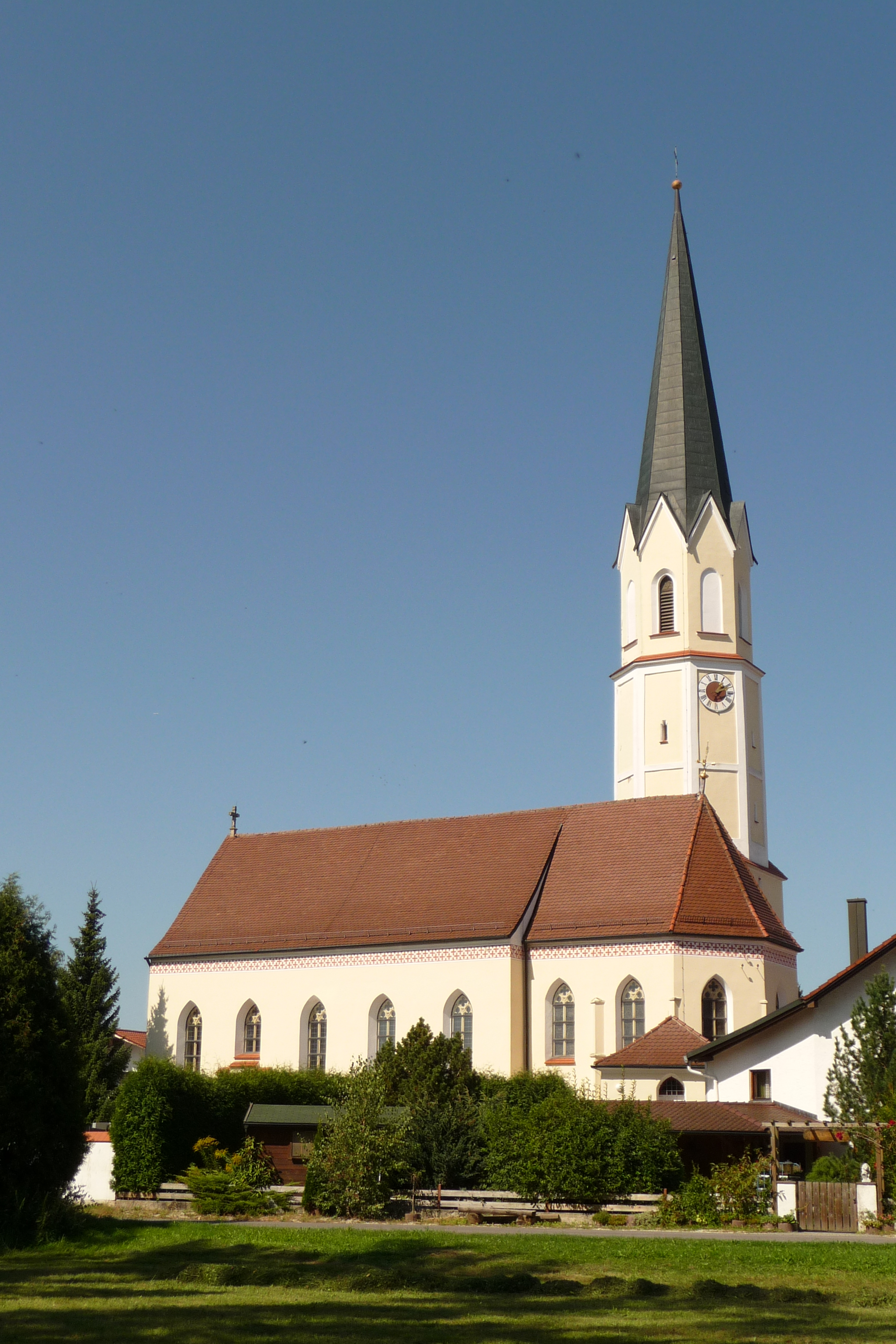
- Church of Saint Giles

- Coat of arms

- Location of Aham within Landshut district
- Interactive map of Aham
- Location within Germany Location within Bavaria
- Coordinates: 48°32′N 12°28′E
- Country: Germany
- State: Bavaria
- Admin. region: Niederbayern
- District: Landshut
- Municipal assoc.: Gerzen

Government
  - Mayor (2020–26): Jens Herrnreiter (FW)

Area
  - Total: 38 km^{2} (15 sq mi)
- Elevation: 420 m (1,380 ft)

Population (2025-12-31)
  - Total: 1,937
  - Density: 51/km^{2} (130/sq mi)
- Time zone: UTC+01:00 (CET)
  - Summer (DST): UTC+02:00 (CEST)
- Postal codes: 84168
- Dialling codes: 08744
- Vehicle registration: LA
- Website: www.gemeinde-aham.de

Aham is a municipality in the district of Landshut in Bavaria in Germany. It lies on the river Vils.
