= Falkenberg (Verwaltungsgemeinschaft) =

- Verwaltungsgemeinschaft
- Location of Falkenberg within Rottal-Inn district
- Interactive map of Falkenberg
- Location within Germany Location within Bavaria
- Coordinates: 48°28′N 12°44′E
- Country: Germany
- State: Bavaria
- Admin. region: Lower Bavaria
- District: Rottal-Inn
- Seat: Falkenberg
- Subdivisions: 3 municipalities

Area
  - Total: 100.88 km^{2} (38.95 sq mi)

Population (2025-12-31)
  - Total: 6,094
  - Density: 60.41/km^{2} (156.5/sq mi)
- Time zone: UTC+01:00 (CET)
  - Summer (DST): UTC+02:00 (CEST)
- Website: www.vg-falkenberg.de

Falkenberg is a Verwaltungsgemeinschaft (municipal association) in the district Rottal-Inn in Bavaria, Germany. Its seat is in Falkenberg.

It consists of the following municipalities:

1. Falkenberg
2. Malgersdorf
3. Rimbach
