= Diepoltskirchen =

Village in Bavaria, Germany

Coordinates: 48°28′53″N 12°42′36″E

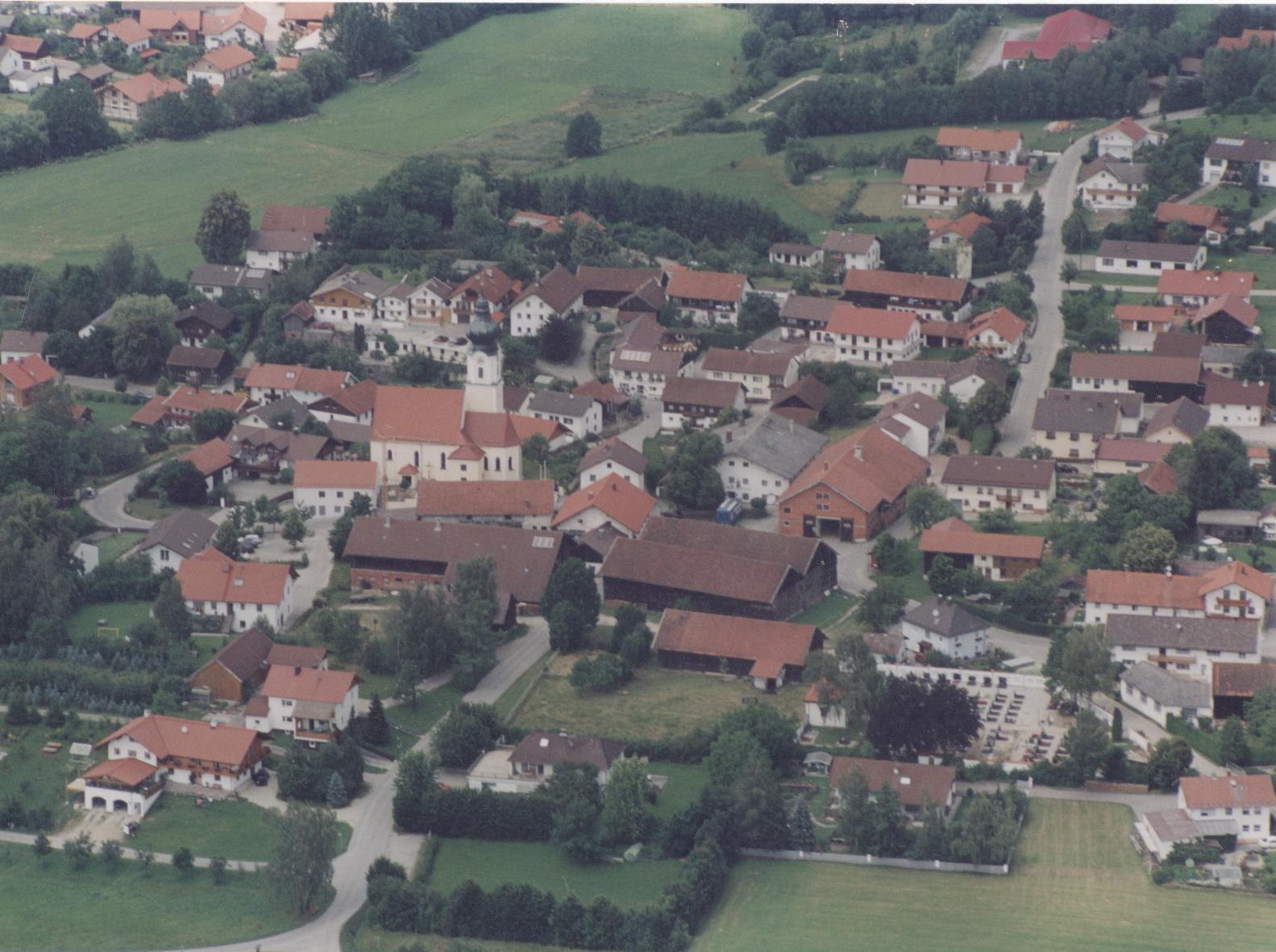
Picture of Diepoltskirchen

Diepoltskirchen is a village in the municipality of Falkenberg, situated in the Lower Bavarian district of Rottal-Inn. The population as on 2022 is 390.

== History ==
In 1255, Diepoltskirchen was alluded to in various manuscripts of Dietramszell Priory. The town and parish's original name was "Dieppoltzkirchen," after the castle located there. According to the "Mirakelbuch" (Librum Miracularum), Diepoltskirchen's church was a pilgrimage destination which expanded from 1420 to 1491 into a compound of administrative buildings.

Diepoltskirchen fell under the jurisdiction of the House of Tattenbach and was later transferred to Count Arco Valley of Adeldorf. In the 18th century (c. 1777), the town suffered a devastating fire, which is recorded in church murals. In 1818-23 the town was divided and designated "Diepoltskirchen I" and "Diepoltskirchen II". Diepoltskirchen I designated the town proper, while Diepoltskirchen II referred to small hamlets in the vicinity of Diepoltskirchen I.

After World War II, these two parts of Diepoltskirchen were brought together to form one township, the township of Diepoltskirchen. This decision which was revoked in 1948 by Mayor Diem and by 1952, the community formerly known as "Diepoltskirchen" was designated as Oberhöft (Oberhoeft). In 1971, Diepoltskirchen and the township of Fünfleiten were absorbed by the community of Falkenberg.

== Parish church ==
The parish church was a popular pilgrimage destination in the 15th century, and is built in the Late Gothic style. The interior of this church is baroque. Its atypical onion dome is the result of restoration after a lightning-strike.
