= Embach, Austria =

Austrian mountain village

Coordinates: 47.290°N 13.001°E

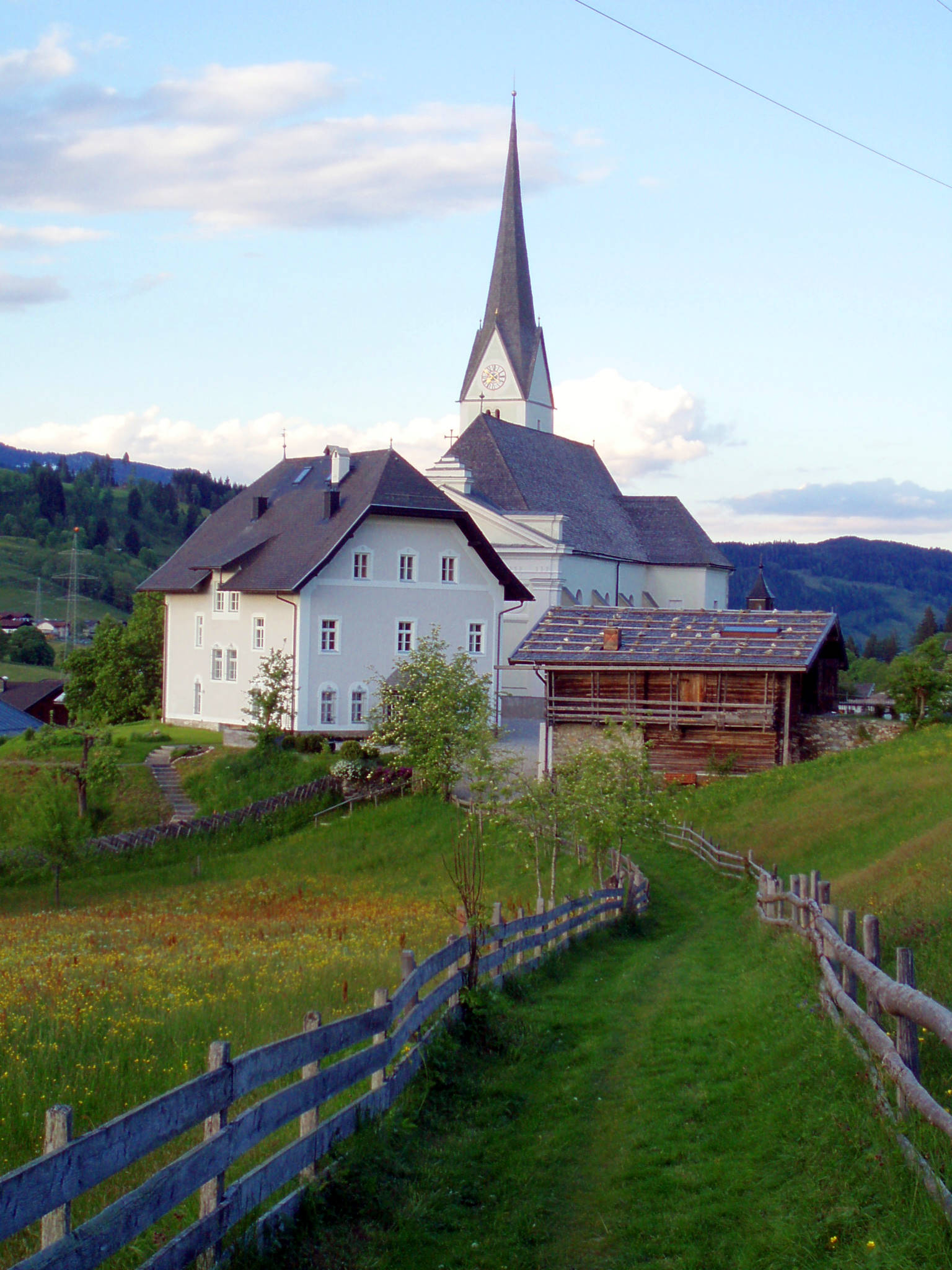
View with church in Embach

Embach (part of the municipality of Lend) is an Austrian mountain village in Zell am See District of Salzburg, Austria. It is situated on a plateau high above the Salzachtal valley at an altitude of 1,013m. with a combined population of approximately 1,500 people.
