= Schalkham =

- Municipality
- Coat of arms

- Location of Schalkham within Landshut district
- Interactive map of Schalkham
- Location within Germany Location within Bavaria
- Coordinates: 48°28′N 12°25′E
- Country: Germany
- State: Bavaria
- Admin. region: Niederbayern
- District: Landshut
- Municipal assoc.: Gerzen

Government
  - Mayor (2020–26): Lorenz Fuchs (FW)

Area
  - Total: 22.71 km^{2} (8.77 sq mi)
- Elevation: 430 m (1,410 ft)

Population (2025-12-31)
  - Total: 912
  - Density: 40.2/km^{2} (104/sq mi)
- Time zone: UTC+01:00 (CET)
  - Summer (DST): UTC+02:00 (CEST)
- Postal codes: 84175
- Dialling codes: 08744
- Vehicle registration: LA
- Website: www.gemeinde-schalkham.de

Schalkham is a municipality in the district of Landshut in Bavaria in Germany.
