= Falkenberg, Lower Bavaria =

Falkenberg
- Municipality
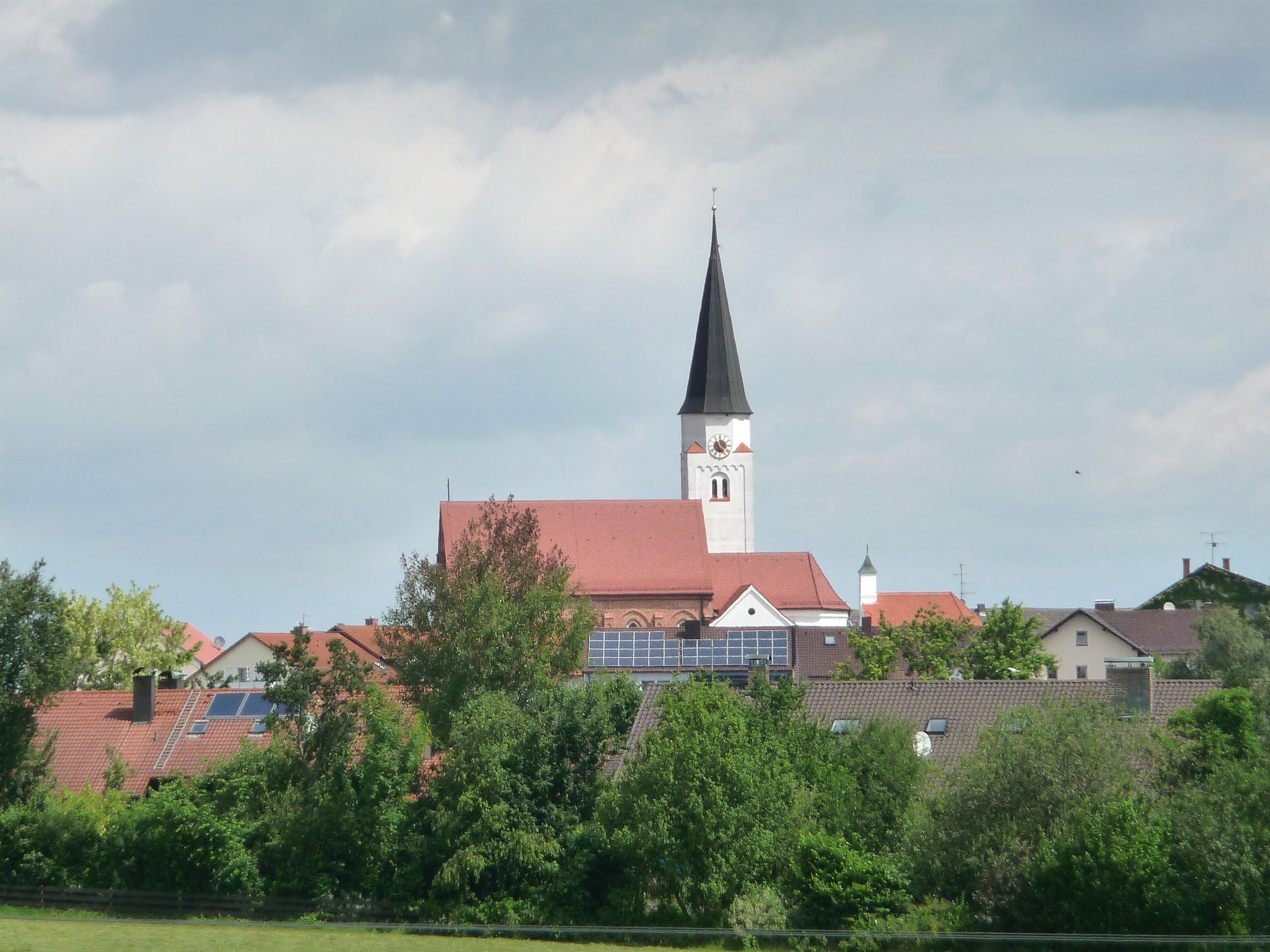
- Church of Saint Lawrence

- Coat of arms

- Location of Falkenberg within Rottal-Inn district
- Interactive map of Falkenberg
- Location within Germany Location within Bavaria
- Coordinates: 48°28′N 12°43′E
- Country: Germany
- State: Bavaria
- Admin. region: Niederbayern
- District: Rottal-Inn
- Municipal assoc.: Falkenberg

Government
  - Mayor (2020–26): Anna Nagl

Area
  - Total: 66.51 km^{2} (25.68 sq mi)
- Elevation: 487 m (1,598 ft)

Population (2025-12-31)
  - Total: 3,942
  - Density: 59.27/km^{2} (153.5/sq mi)
- Time zone: UTC+01:00 (CET)
  - Summer (DST): UTC+02:00 (CEST)
- Postal codes: 84326
- Dialling codes: 08727
- Vehicle registration: PAN
- Website: www.gemeinde-falkenberg.de

Falkenberg (German pronunciation: [ˈfalkŋ̍ˌbɛʁk]; Central Bavarian: Foikaberg) is a municipality in the district of Rottal-Inn in Bavaria in Germany. It includes the village of Diepoltskirchen.
