= Rimbach, Lower Bavaria =

Rimbach (District of Rottal-Inn)
- Municipality
- Coat of arms

- Location of Rimbach (District of Rottal-Inn) within Rottal-Inn district
- Interactive map of Rimbach (District of Rottal-Inn)
- Location within Germany Location within Bavaria
- Coordinates: 48°28′N 12°39′E
- Country: Germany
- State: Bavaria
- Admin. region: Niederbayern
- District: Rottal-Inn
- Municipal assoc.: Falkenberg

Government
  - Mayor (2020–26): Otto Fisch (CSU)

Area
  - Total: 22.9 km^{2} (8.8 sq mi)
- Elevation: 454 m (1,490 ft)

Population (2025-12-31)
  - Total: 927
  - Density: 40.5/km^{2} (105/sq mi)
- Time zone: UTC+01:00 (CET)
  - Summer (DST): UTC+02:00 (CEST)
- Postal codes: 84326
- Dialling codes: 08727
- Vehicle registration: PAN

Rimbach (German pronunciation: [ˈʁɪmbax]) is a municipality in the district of Rottal-Inn in Bavaria in Germany.
