= Gerzen =

- Municipality
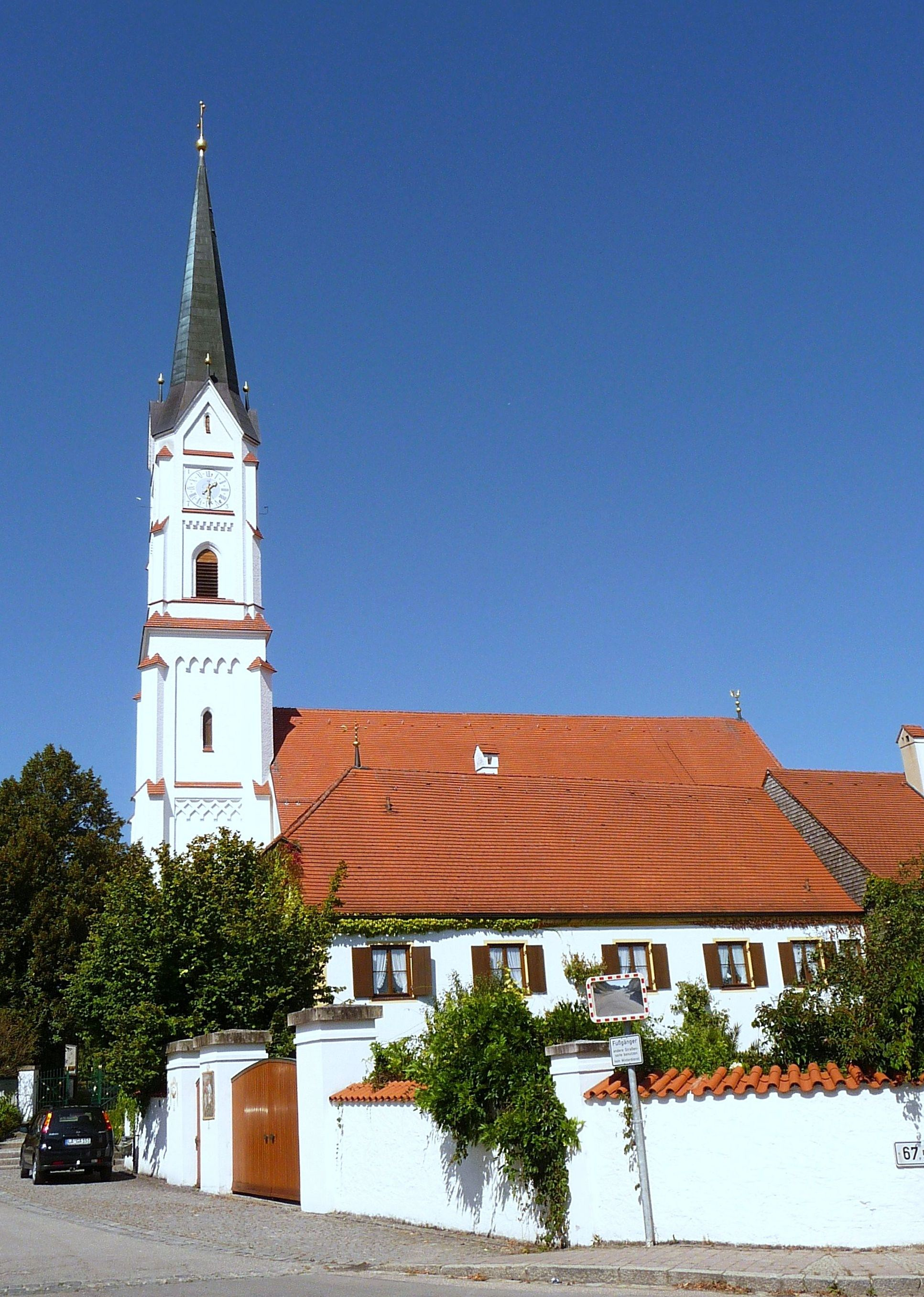
- Church of Saint George

- Coat of arms

- Location of Gerzen within Landshut district
- Interactive map of Gerzen
- Location within Germany Location within Bavaria
- Coordinates: 48°31′N 12°25′E
- Country: Germany
- State: Bavaria
- Admin. region: Niederbayern
- District: Landshut
- Municipal assoc.: Gerzen
- Subdivisions: 2 Ortsteile

Government
  - Mayor (2020–26): Johann Luger (FW)

Area
  - Total: 17.00 km^{2} (6.56 sq mi)
- Elevation: 433 m (1,421 ft)

Population (2025-12-31)
  - Total: 1,897
  - Density: 111.6/km^{2} (289.0/sq mi)
- Time zone: UTC+01:00 (CET)
  - Summer (DST): UTC+02:00 (CEST)
- Postal codes: 84175
- Dialling codes: 08744
- Vehicle registration: LA
- Website: www.gerzen.de

Gerzen is a municipality in the district of Landshut in Bavaria in Germany.
