= Eichendorf =

- Municipality
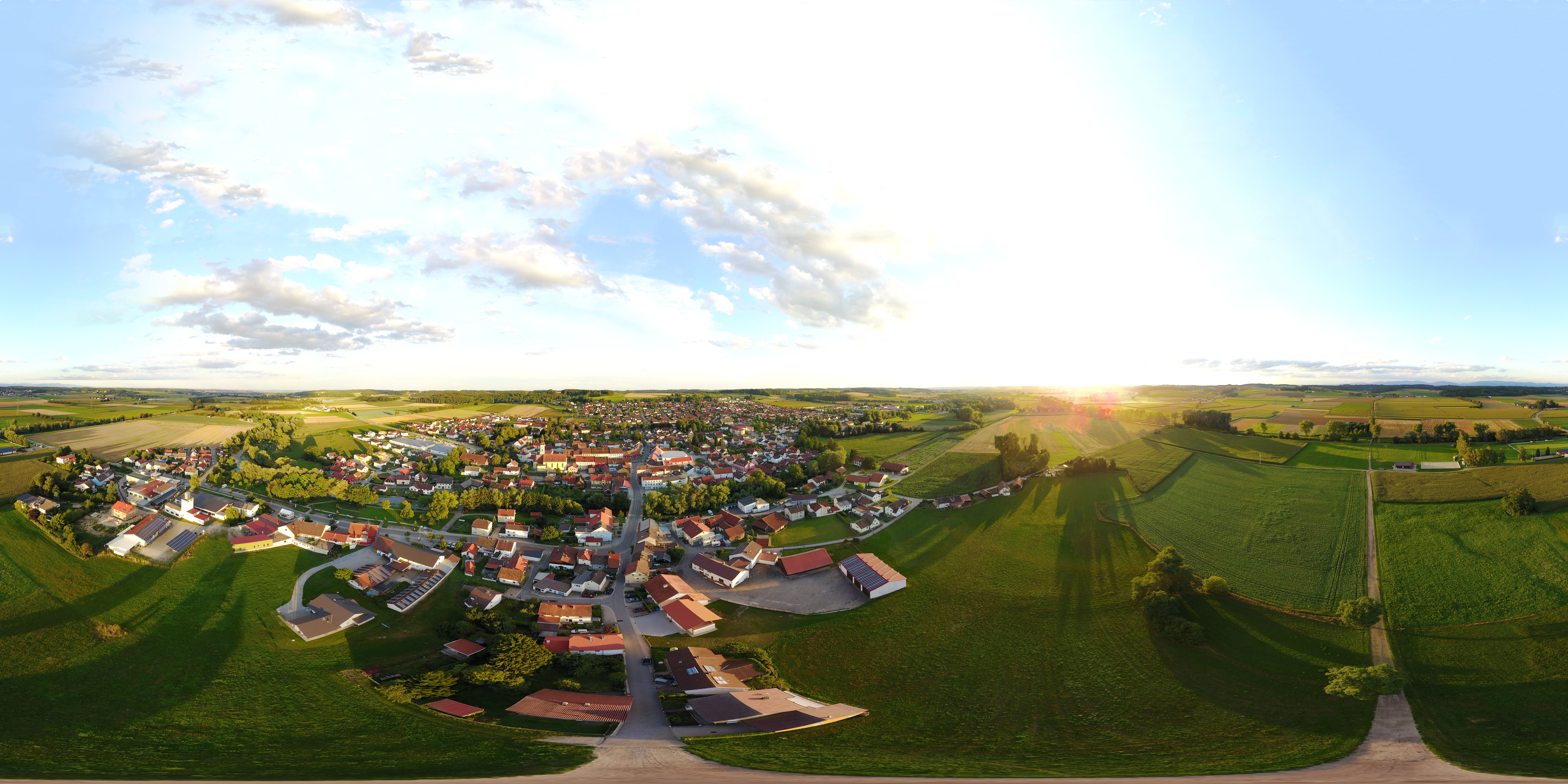
- Panorama of Eichendorf

- Coat of arms

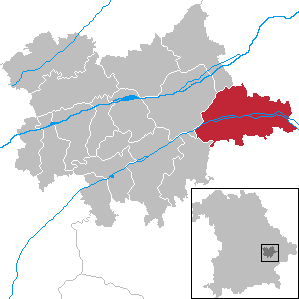
- Location of Eichendorf within Dingolfing-Landau district
- Interactive map of Eichendorf
- Location within Germany Location within Bavaria
- Coordinates: 48°38′N 12°51′E
- Country: Germany
- State: Bavaria
- Admin. region: Niederbayern
- District: Dingolfing-Landau
- Subdivisions: 118 Ortsteile

Government
  - Mayor (2020–26): Josef Beham

Area
  - Total: 98.19 km^{2} (37.91 sq mi)
- Elevation: 355 m (1,165 ft)

Population (2025-12-31)
  - Total: 6,671
  - Density: 67.94/km^{2} (176.0/sq mi)
- Time zone: UTC+01:00 (CET)
  - Summer (DST): UTC+02:00 (CEST)
- Postal codes: 94428
- Dialling codes: 09952, 09956 und 08547
- Vehicle registration: DGF
- Website: www.markt-eichendorf.de

Eichendorf (Bavarian: Oachadoaf) is a municipality in the district of Dingolfing-Landau in Bavaria in Germany.

== Geography ==
=== Geographical location ===
Eichendorf lies on the river Vils. The market town is still very rural and serves as an administrative centre to the surrounding countryside.

== History ==
=== 19th century and prior ===
The settlement „Euchendorf“ was first mentioned in a document dated March 24, 1075 from Pope Gregory VII, in which he confirmed to Bishop Altmann von Passau the donation of three farmstead and a church of Eichendorf to the Monastery of St. Nikola at Passau. The remaining land remained in possession of the Bishop, who had most likely owned it since the 8th century.

From the 12th to the 14th century there appears to have been nobility in the area. In the archives of the Aldersbach Abbey a Heinricus de Euchendorf was mentioned as a witness in 1170, and in the archives of the Monastery of St. Nikola a Karl von Euchendorf was mentioned in 1334. In 1350 Heinrich der Euchendorfer acquired land belonging to the Abbey of St. Nikola at Leibrecht.

In 1264 Eichendorf was mentioned as „forum Eichendorf“, – Market Eichendorf – in a register of assets and income of the Prince-Bishopric of Passau. In 1358 Eichendorf already had the right to hold three annual markets and a weekly market, confirmed in a letter from duke Albert of Bavaria.

On October 7, 1334 the Holy Roman Emperor Louis IV and his cousin Duke Henry of Lower Bavaria met in Eichendorf for reconciliation talks. The area was badly affected in the War of the Succession of Landshut; As recompense to the townsfolk for reconstruction, Duke William IV allowed a fourth annual market.

In the Thirty Years' War, Swedish troops burnt Eichendorf to the ground (completely, with the exception of the church). Further fires in 1835, 1848 and 1850 devastated entire districts. Eichendorf was promoted to parish status in 1896; it had previously belonged to the parish of Dornach.

=== 20th century ===
The opening of the train line from Aufhausen to Kröhstorf in 1915 gave the town its first rail connection. Trains stopped running in 1971 and the track was dismantled in 1973; nowadays the Vilstal cycle path runs where the track once was.

In the Second World War Eichendorf came under fire and some districts were destroyed.
