= Vils (Danube) =

River in Germany

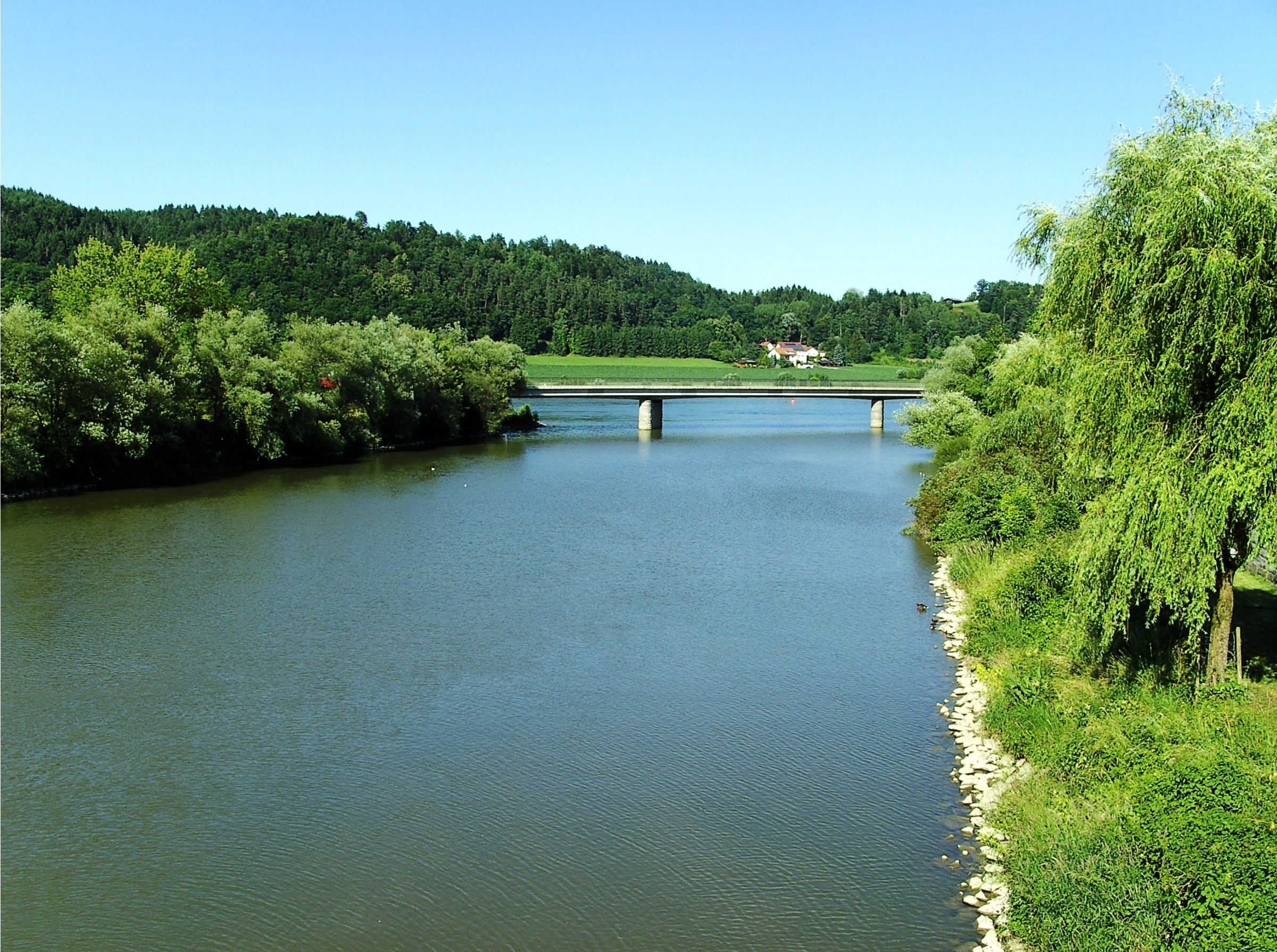
- Vils close to entering Danube

Location
- Country: Germany
- State: Bavaria
- Cities: Schalkham; Gerzen; Aham; Frontenhausen; Marklkofen; Reisbach; Eichendorf; Aldersbach; Vilshofen

Physical characteristics
- Source: Große Vils
  - location: Seeon, Lengdorf, Upper Bavaria
  - coordinates: 48°17′12″N 12°02′25″E
  - elevation: 502 m (1,647 ft)
- 2nd source: Kleine Vils
  - location: Vilsheim, Lower Bavaria, Germany
  - coordinates: 48°26′45″N 12°06′28″E
  - elevation: 466 m (1,529 ft)
- Source confluence: Gerzen
  - coordinates: 48°29′49″N 12°25′21″E
  - elevation: 425.5 m (1,396 ft)
- Mouth: Danube
  - coordinates: 48°37′58″N 13°11′31″E
  - elevation: 279 m (915 ft)
- Length: 81.7 km (50.8 mi)
- Basin size: 1,449 km^{2} (559 sq mi)
- Discharge
  - average: 76.8 m^{3}/s (2,710 cu ft/s)
  - maximum: 520 m^{3}/s (18,000 cu ft/s)

Basin features
- Progression: Danube→ Black Sea

The Vils (German pronunciation: [fɪls]) is a river in Bavaria, Germany, it is a right tributary of the Danube.

The Vils is formed by the confluence of its two source rivers, the Kleine Vils and the Große Vils, in Gerzen. It is 81.7 km (50.8 mi) long (127.5 km (79.2 mi) including Große Vils). It flows east through a rural area with small towns, including Aham, Frontenhausen, Marklkofen, Reisbach, Eichendorf and Aldersbach. It flows into the Danube in Vilshofen.

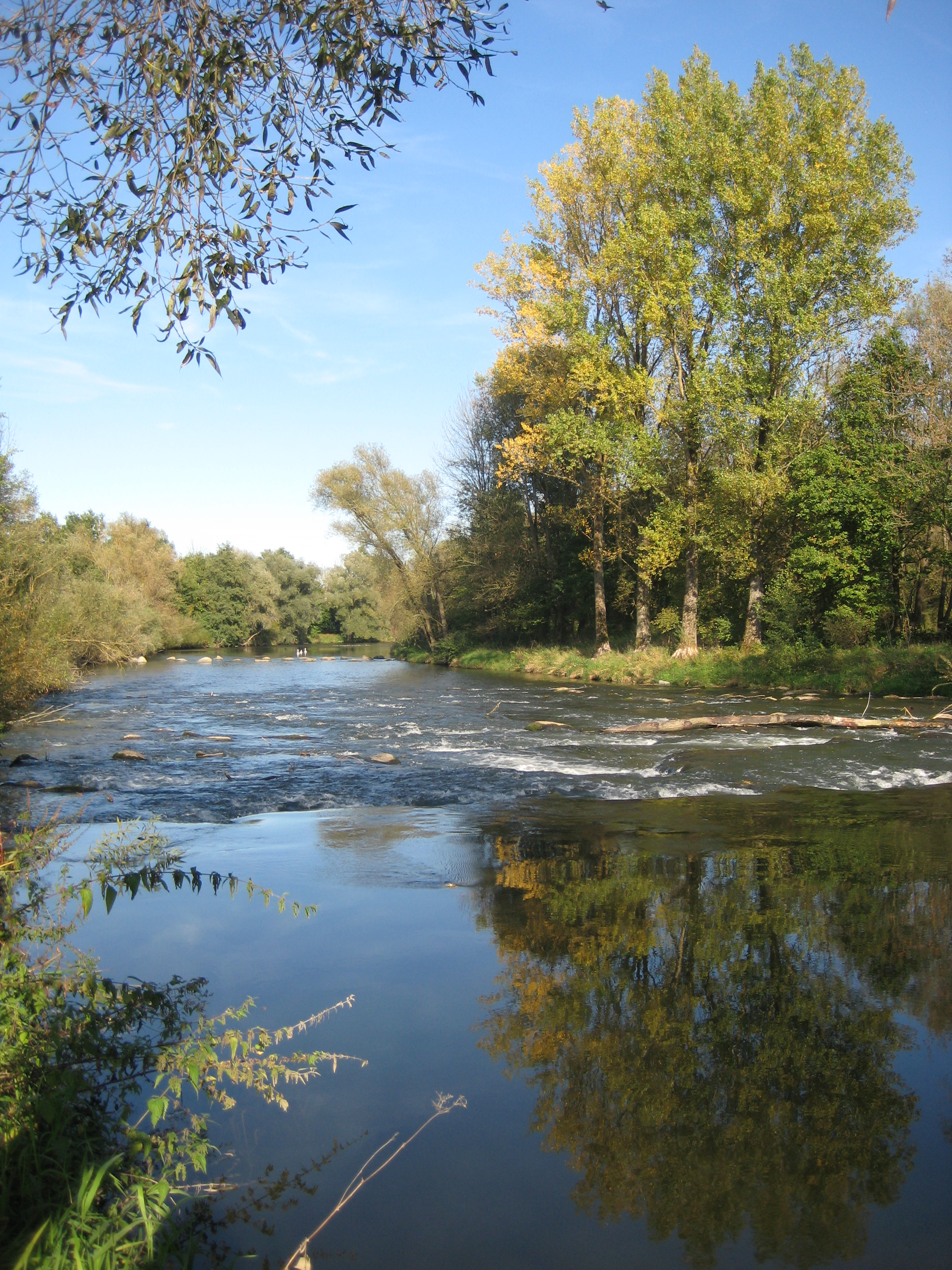

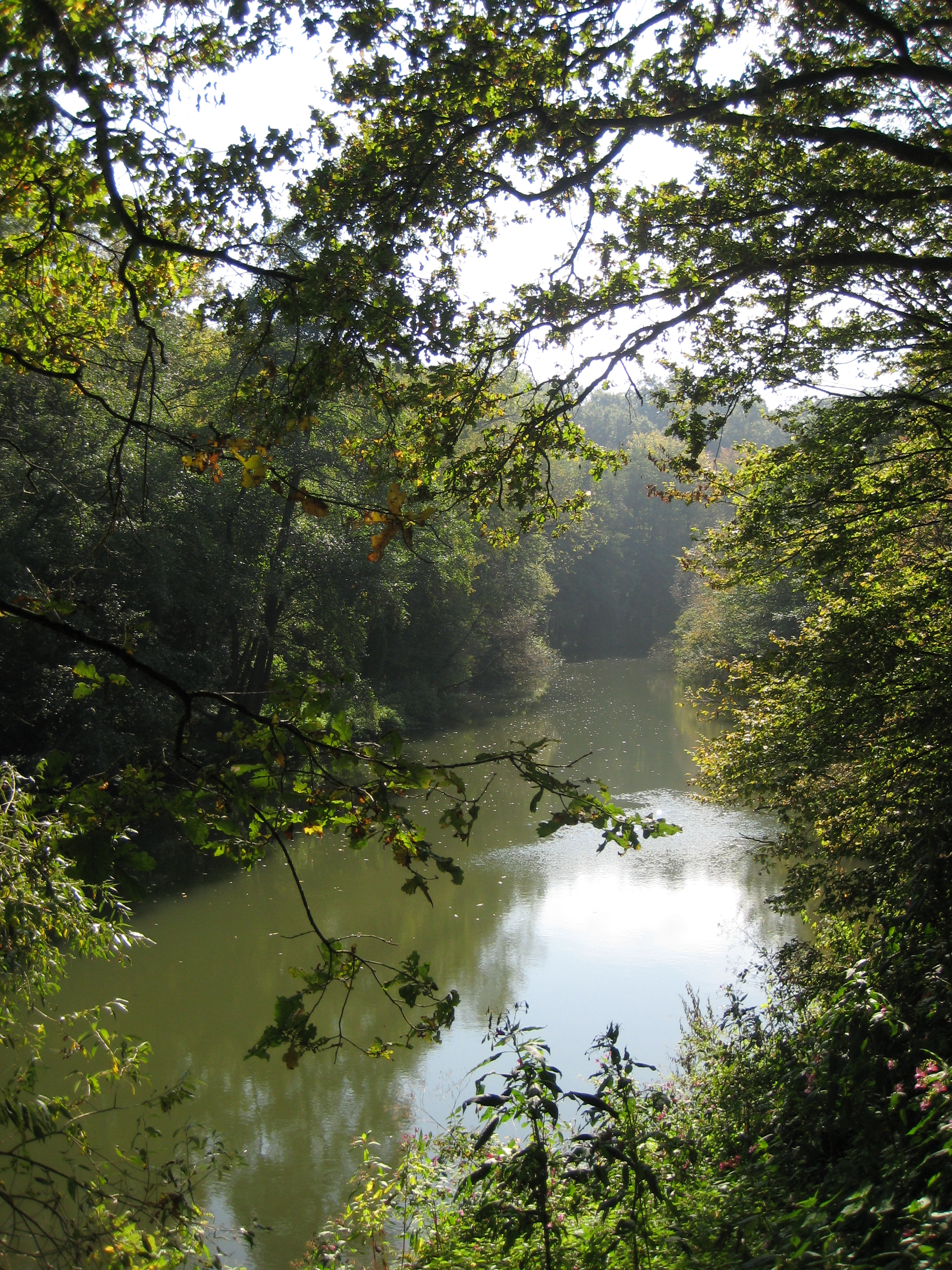

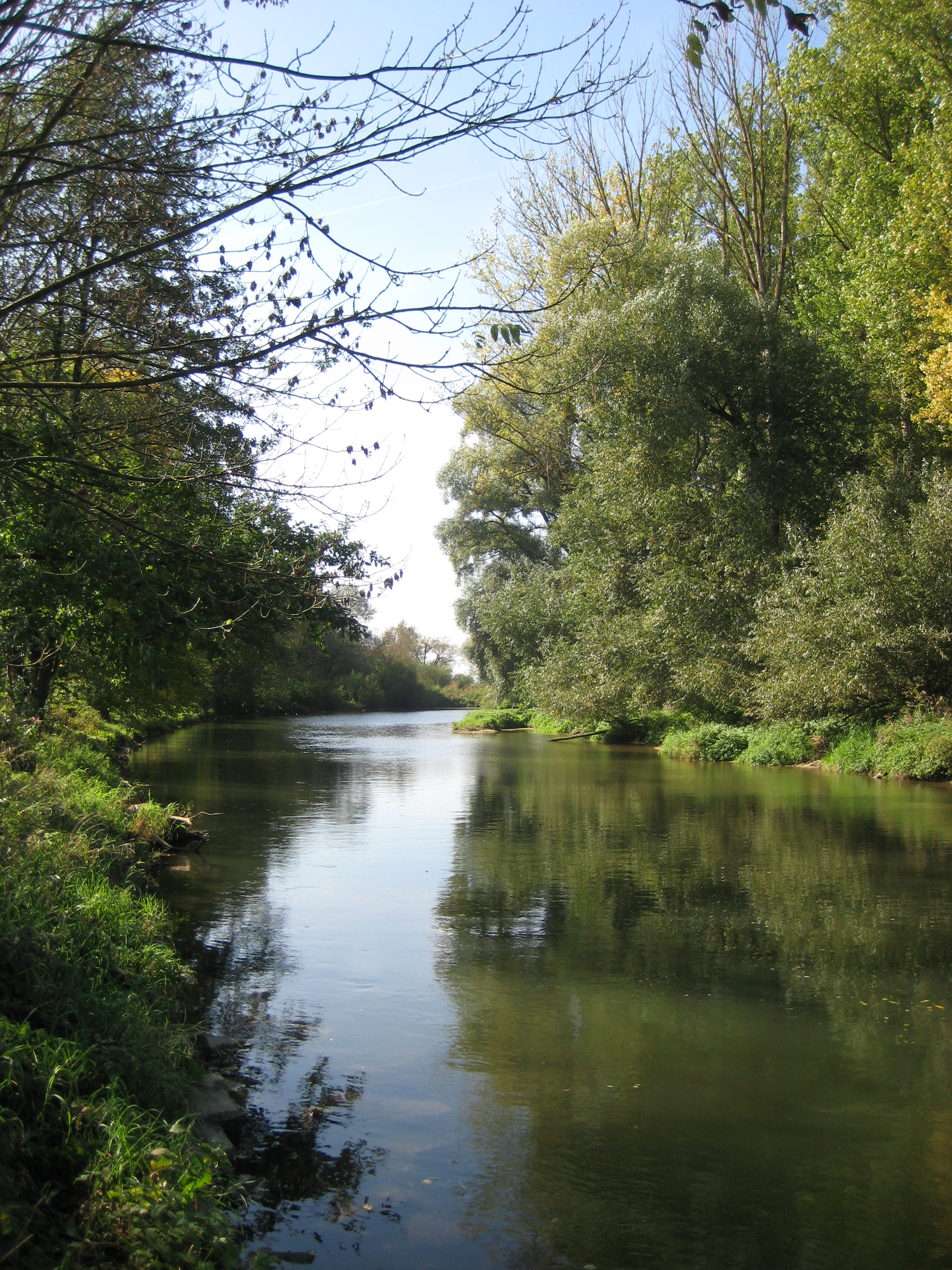

== See also ==
- List of rivers of Bavaria
