= Arnstorf =

- Municipality
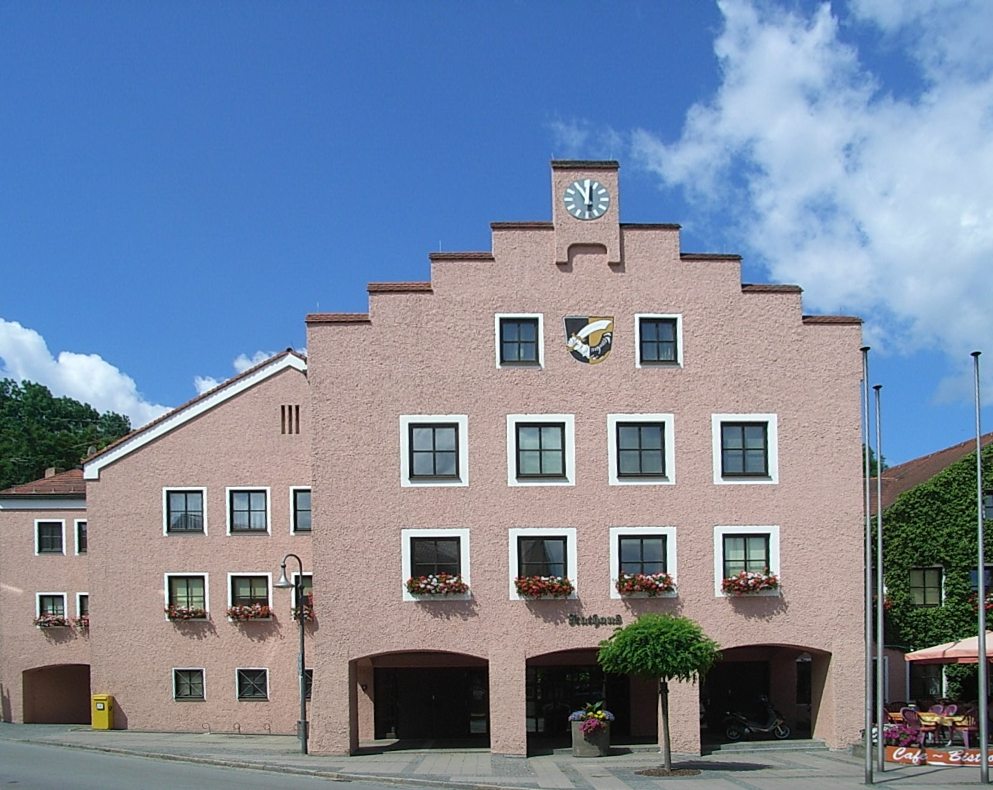
- Town hall

- Coat of arms

- Location of Arnstorf within Rottal-Inn district
- Interactive map of Arnstorf
- Location within Germany Location within Bavaria
- Coordinates: 48°34′N 12°49′E
- Country: Germany
- State: Bavaria
- Admin. region: Niederbayern
- District: Rottal-Inn

Government
  - Mayor (2020–26): Christoph Brunner

Area
  - Total: 80.37 km^{2} (31.03 sq mi)
- Elevation: 397 m (1,302 ft)

Population (2025-12-31)
  - Total: 6,523
  - Density: 81.16/km^{2} (210.2/sq mi)
- Time zone: UTC+01:00 (CET)
  - Summer (DST): UTC+02:00 (CEST)
- Postal codes: 94424
- Dialling codes: 08723
- Vehicle registration: PAN
- Website: www.arnstorf.de

Arnstorf (German pronunciation: [ˈaʁnstɔʁf]; Central Bavarian: Oarmstorf) is a municipality in the district of Rottal-Inn in Bavaria in Germany.

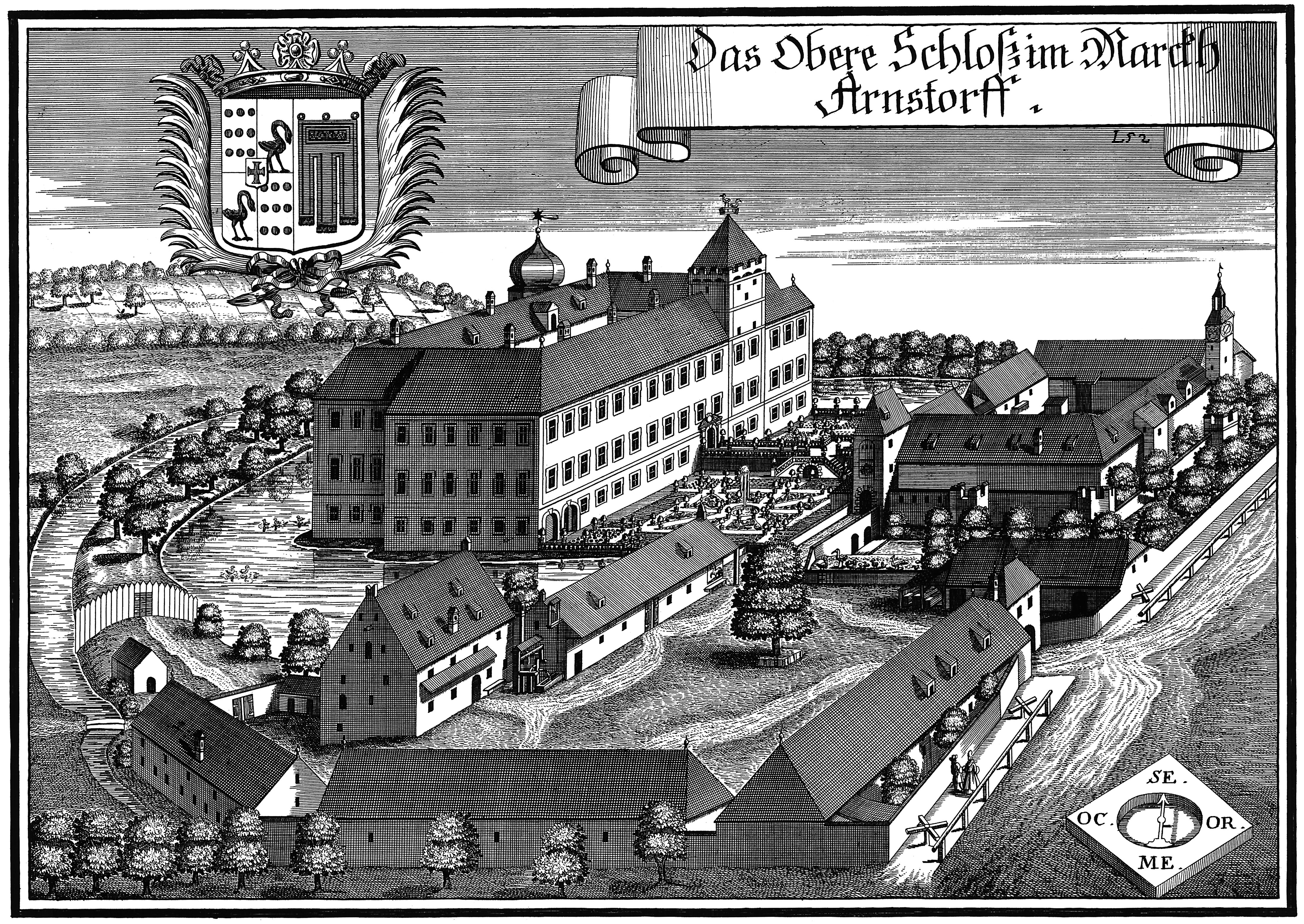
Upper Castle (early 18th century)

Arnstorf has 151 municipal parts:

- Adermann
- Aicha
- Aign
- Aigner im Ried
- Altmannskinden
- Arnstorf
- Asbach
- Baumgarten
- Bergham
- Birchen
- Birkafeld
- Blumdorf
- Bruckbach
- Bruckmühle
- Burgerfeld
- Daimhäuseln
- Dingelsberg
- Döttenau
- Döttenberg
- Eck
- Ed
- Eiselstorf
- Falkerding
- Fernbirchen
- Freising
- Furtschneid
- Gaiswimm
- Gartenöd
- Geiersberg
- Geiselsdorf
- Gerlstetten
- Grafendorf
- Grub
- Habersbrunn
- Hafenöd
- Hag
- Hainberg
- Heißen
- Heißenhub
- Henning
- Hinterholzen
- Hinteröd
- Hochwimm
- Hödl
- Hof
- Hoheneichberg
- Holz
- Holzen
- Holzham
- Holzhäuseln
- Holzmann
- Holzweber
- Jägerndorf
- Kapfing
- Kattenberg
- Kellerhaus
- Kemathen
- Kloberg
- Knockenthal
- Kohlstorf
- Kolmöd
- Kornöd
- Kreiling
- Kroneck
- Kudlhub
- Kühbach
- Kühblei
- Kürpen
- Lampersdorf
- Langhub
- Lindach am Burgerfeld
- Loh
- Lohmann
- Mariakirchen
- Mitterhausen
- Mühlberg
- Neukirchen
- Niederlucken
- Nömer
- Oberelend
- Oberradlsbach
- Oberreut
- Oberwimpersing
- Ofen
- Padersberg
- Pauxöd
- Petersdorf
- Picklöd
- Puch
- Püchl
- Qualn
- Rabenbrunn
- Radelsbach
- Raisting
- Reisach
- Reisat
- Reitberg
- Reith
- Ried
- Ruppertskirchen
- Sägmühl
- Salksdorf
- Sattlern
- Schachten
- Schachtenmann
- Schickanöd
- Schimpfhausen
- Schleeburg
- Schlott
- Schmidhub
- Schornöd
- Schröttendorf
- Sendlmeier
- Sichenpoint
- Siegerstorf
- Siglthann
- Sommerstorf
- Speisöd
- Stadl
- Staudach
- Steindorf
- Stelzenöd
- Stierberg
- Stocka
- Stockahausen
- Thal
- Thalhausen
- Thannermann
- Thanning
- Triefelden
- Unterelend
- Unterkager
- Unterreut
- Unterschachten
- Unterwimpersing
- Volkstorf
- Wabach
- Wada
- Wadermann
- Weilnbach
- Weingarten
- Westerndorf
- Wiedmais
- Wimpersing
- Winchen
- Zachenöd
- Zankl
- Zeil
- Zeilling
- Zenzlhub
- Zwilling
