= Rottal-Inn (electoral district) =

Federal electoral district of Germany

229 Rottal-Inn
- Electoral district for the Bundestag
- Rottal-Inn in 2025
- State: Bavaria
- Population: 231,100 (2019)
- Electorate: 173,632 (2021)
- Major settlements: Dingolfing; Landau an der Isar; Eggenfelden
- Area: 2,331.3 km^{2}

Current electoral district
- Created: 1949
- Party: CSU
- Member: Günter Baumgartner
- Elected: 2025

Rottal-Inn is an electoral constituency (German: Wahlkreis) represented in the Bundestag. It elects one member via first-past-the-post voting. Under the current constituency numbering system, it is designated as constituency 229. It is located in southeastern Bavaria, comprising the Dingolfing-Landau district, Rottal-Inn district, and small parts of the Landkreis Landshut district.

Rottal-Inn was created for the inaugural 1949 federal election. Since 2025, it has been represented by Günter Baumgartner of the Christian Social Union (CSU).

== Geography ==
Rottal-Inn is located in southeastern Bavaria. As of the 2021 federal election, it comprises the districts of Dingolfing-Landau and Rottal-Inn as well as the Verwaltungsgemeinschaften of Gerzen and Wörth a.d.Isar from the Landkreis Landshut district.

== History ==
Rottal-Inn was created in 1949, then known as Pfarrkirchen. It acquired its current name in the 1976 election. In the 1949 election, it was Bavaria constituency 16 in the numbering system. In the 1953 through 1961 elections, it was number 211. In the 1965 through 1972 elections, it was number 217. In the 1976 through 1998 elections, it was number 216. In the 2002 and 2005 elections, it was number 231. In the 2009 through 2021 elections, it was number 230. From the 2025 election, it has been number 229.

Originally, the constituency comprised the districts of Pfarrkirchen, Eggenfelden, and Vilsbiburg. From 1965 through 1972, it also contained the Griesbach district. From 1976 through 2013, it comprised the Rottal-Inn and Dingolfing-Landau districts. In the 2017 election, it acquired the Verwaltungsgemeinschaft of Gerzen from the Landkreis Landshut district. It further acquired the Verwaltungsgemeinschaft of Wörth a.d.Isar in the 2021 election.

Election	No.	Name	Borders
1949	16	Pfarrkirchen	Pfarrkirchen district; Eggenfelden district; Vilsbiburg district
1953	211	Pfarrkirchen	Pfarrkirchen district; Eggenfelden district; Vilsbiburg district
1957	211	Pfarrkirchen	Pfarrkirchen district; Eggenfelden district; Vilsbiburg district
1961	211	Pfarrkirchen	Pfarrkirchen district; Eggenfelden district; Vilsbiburg district
1965	217	Pfarrkirchen	Pfarrkirchen district; Eggenfelden district; Vilsbiburg district; Griesbach district
1969	217	Pfarrkirchen	Pfarrkirchen district; Eggenfelden district; Vilsbiburg district; Griesbach district
1972	217	Pfarrkirchen	Pfarrkirchen district; Eggenfelden district; Vilsbiburg district; Griesbach district
1976	216	Rottal-Inn	Dingolfing-Landau district; Rottal-Inn
1980	216	Rottal-Inn	Dingolfing-Landau district; Rottal-Inn
1983	216	Rottal-Inn	Dingolfing-Landau district; Rottal-Inn
1987	216	Rottal-Inn	Dingolfing-Landau district; Rottal-Inn
1990	216	Rottal-Inn	Dingolfing-Landau district; Rottal-Inn
1994	216	Rottal-Inn	Dingolfing-Landau district; Rottal-Inn
1998	216	Rottal-Inn	Dingolfing-Landau district; Rottal-Inn
2002	231	Rottal-Inn	Dingolfing-Landau district; Rottal-Inn
2005	231	Rottal-Inn	Dingolfing-Landau district; Rottal-Inn
2009	230	Rottal-Inn	Dingolfing-Landau district; Rottal-Inn
2013	230	Rottal-Inn	Dingolfing-Landau district; Rottal-Inn
2017	230	Rottal-Inn	Dingolfing-Landau district; Rottal-Inn; Landkreis Landshut (only Gerzen Verwaltungsgemeinschaft)
2021	230	Rottal-Inn	Dingolfing-Landau district; Rottal-Inn; Landkreis Landshut (only Gerzen and Wörth a.d.Isar Verwaltungsgemeinschaften)
2025	229	Rottal-Inn	Dingolfing-Landau district; Rottal-Inn; Landkreis Landshut (only Gerzen and Wörth a.d.Isar Verwaltungsgemeinschaften)

== Members ==
The constituency has been held by the Christian Social Union (CSU) during all but one Bundestag term since its creation. It was first represented by Conrad Fink from 1949 to 1953. He was elected for the Bavaria Party (BP), but joined the CSU in January 1952. Max Riederer von Paar of the CSU won the constituency in 1953 and served one term. Friedrich Kempfler was then representative from 1957 to 1976, followed by Günther Müller from 1976 to 1994, and Max Straubinger was from 1994 until 2025. Günter Baumgartner retained the seat for the CSU in 2025

Election	Member	Party	%
1949	Conrad Fink (Note: Fink was elected for the Bavaria Party, but joined the CSU in January 1952.)	BP	39.2
1949	Conrad Fink	CSU	39.2
1953	Max Riederer von Paar	CSU	54.1
1957	Friedrich Kempfler	CSU	68.2
1961	Friedrich Kempfler	CSU	74.3
1965	Friedrich Kempfler	CSU	74.7
1969	Friedrich Kempfler	CSU	69.0
1972	Friedrich Kempfler	CSU	71.5
1976	Günther Müller	CSU	70.1
1980	Günther Müller	CSU	69.7
1983	Günther Müller	CSU	71.1
1987	Günther Müller	CSU	65.6
1990	Günther Müller	CSU	60.3
1994	Max Straubinger	CSU	61.9
1998	Max Straubinger	CSU	59.3
2002	Max Straubinger	CSU	73.0
2005	Max Straubinger	CSU	65.0
2009	Max Straubinger	CSU	53.6
2013	Max Straubinger	CSU	61.1
2017	Max Straubinger	CSU	45.0
2021	Max Straubinger	CSU	35.1
2025	Günter Baumgartner	CSU	34.9

== Election results ==
=== 2025 election ===
Federal election (2025): Rottal-Inn
Notes:	Blue background denotes the winner of the electorate vote. Pink background denotes a candidate elected from their party list. Yellow background denotes an electorate win by a list member, or other incumbent. A ✓ or ✗ denotes status of any incumbent, win or lose respectively.						
Party	Candidate	Votes	%	±%	Party votes	%	±%
CSU	Günter Baumgartner	49,581	34.9	▼0.2	54,707	38.4	▲4.2
AfD	Stephan Protschka	32,882	23.1	▲10.5	37,105	26.1	▲13.8
FW	Hubert Aiwanger	32,668	23.0	▲6.3	14,997	10.5	▼4.4
SPD	Severin Johannes Antonin Eder	9,947	7.0	▼4.9	10,899	7.7	▼6.7
Greens	Marlene Edeltraud Schönberger	7,688	5.4	▼2.3	7,841	5.5	▼1.6
Left	Stefan Hemmann	4,166	2.9	▲1.5	4,990	3.5	▲1.6
FDP	Claus Peter Rothlehner	2,625	1.8	▼5.9	4,272	3.0	▼6.7
BSW					4,144	2.9	
ÖDP	Maximilian Olgerts Josef Eineichner	1,611	1.1	▼0.9	870	0.6	▼0.3
APT					821	0.6	▼0.3
Volt	Jakob Ludwig Baumann	898	0.6		457	0.3	▲0.2
PARTEI					378	0.3	▼0.2
dieBasis					368	0.3	▼1.1
BP					313	0.2	▼0.6
BD					79	0.1	
Humanists					66	0.0	Steady
MLPD					15	0.0	Steady
Informal votes		663			407		
Total valid votes		142,066			142,322		
Turnout		142,729	82.7	▲5.6			
CSU hold	Majority	16,699	11.8	▼6.6			

=== 2021 election ===
Federal election (2021): Rottal-Inn
Notes:	Blue background denotes the winner of the electorate vote. Pink background denotes a candidate elected from their party list. Yellow background denotes an electorate win by a list member, or other incumbent. A ✓ or ✗ denotes status of any incumbent, win or lose respectively.						
Party	Candidate	Votes	%	±%	Party votes	%	±%
CSU	✓ Max Straubinger	46,493	35.1	▼9.7	45,687	34.3	▼8.3
FW	Werner Schießl	22,158	16.7	▲11.7	19,910	14.9	▲11.1
AfD	Stephan Protschka	16,808	12.7	▼2.4	16,384	12.3	▼4.3
SPD	Severin Eder	15,794	11.9	▲2.4	19,108	14.3	▲1.6
FDP	Claus Rothlehner	10,210	7.7	▲0.7	12,904	9.7	▲0.6
Greens	Marlene Schönberger	10,188	7.7	▲2.8	9,495	7.1	▲1.9
BP	Anton Maller	2,746	2.1	▼0.2	1,044	0.8	▼0.7
ÖDP	Daniela Blankenburg	2,647	2.0	▼0.5	1,157	0.9	▼0.7
dieBasis	Eva Maria Ströhm	2,385	1.8		1,764	1.3	
Left	Rudolf Schöberl	1,912	1.4	▼2.5	2,487	1.9	▼2.6
Tierschutzpartei					1,228	0.9	▲0.1
PARTEI	Robert Tolksdorf	1,106	0.8		675	0.5	▲0.1
Pirates					300	0.2	0.0
Unabhängige					199	0.1	
Team Todenhöfer					183	0.1	
Volt					156	0.1	
Gesundheitsforschung					115	0.1	0.0
NPD					98	0.1	▼0.2
V-Partei3					84	0.1	▼0.1
The III. Path					74	0.1	
Humanists					56	0.0	
du.					49	0.0	
Bündnis C					47	0.0	
DKP					18	0.0	0.0
MLPD					12	0.0	0.0
LKR					12	0.0	
Informal votes		1,438			639		
Total valid votes		132,447			133,246		
Turnout		133,885	77.1	▲3.3			
CSU hold	Majority	24,335	18.4	▼11.5			

=== 2017 election ===
Federal election (2017): Rottal-Inn
Notes:	Blue background denotes the winner of the electorate vote. Pink background denotes a candidate elected from their party list. Yellow background denotes an electorate win by a list member, or other incumbent. A ✓ or ✗ denotes status of any incumbent, win or lose respectively.						
Party	Candidate	Votes	%	±%	Party votes	%	±%
CSU	✓ Max Straubinger	55,364	45.0	▼16.2	52,752	42.7	▼16.1
AfD	Stephan Protschka	18,539	15.1	▲12.1	20,401	16.5	▲12.9
SPD	Florian Pronold	17,683	14.4	▼1.7	15,765	12.8	▼2.3
FDP	Christoph Zeitler	8,625	7.0	▲5.0	11,215	9.1	▲5.0
Greens	Johann Feirer	6,061	4.9	▲0.2	6,478	5.2	▲0.3
FW	Lorenz Fuchs	6,030	4.9	▼0.3	4,690	3.8	▲0.2
Left	Marco Stöger	4,851	3.9	▲1.3	5,510	4.5	▲1.8
ÖDP	Klaus Seufzger	3,131	2.5	▼0.2	2,004	1.6	▼0.1
BP	Anton Maller	2,776	2.3		1,859	1.5	▲0.2
Tierschutzpartei					1,023	0.8	▲0.1
PARTEI					460	0.4	
NPD					363	0.3	▼0.9
Pirates					277	0.2	▼1.2
DM					160	0.1	
Gesundheitsforschung					156	0.1	
V-Partei³					144	0.1	
BGE					109	0.1	
DiB					99	0.1	
BüSo					19	0.0	0.0
MLPD					11	0.0	0.0
DKP					10	0.0	
Informal votes		1,239			794		
Total valid votes		123,060			123,505		
Turnout		124,299	73.7	▲9.9			
CSU hold	Majority	36,825	29.9	▼15.7			

=== 2013 election ===
Federal election (2013): Rottal-Inn
Notes:	Blue background denotes the winner of the electorate vote. Pink background denotes a candidate elected from their party list. Yellow background denotes an electorate win by a list member, or other incumbent. A ✓ or ✗ denotes status of any incumbent, win or lose respectively.						
Party	Candidate	Votes	%	±%	Party votes	%	±%
CSU	✓ Max Straubinger	62,748	61.1	▲7.5	60,501	58.8	▲8.7
SPD	Florian Pronold	16,619	16.2	▼1.3	15,626	15.2	▲1.5
FW	Max Winkler	5,378	5.2		3,602	3.5	
Greens	Stefan Haug	4,773	4.7	▼1.0	4,996	4.9	▼1.7
AfD	Stephan Protschka	3,129	3.0		3,723	3.6	
ÖDP	Jutta Ehrhardt	2,857	2.8	▼1.7	1,740	1.7	▼0.7
Left	Marco Stöger	2,668	2.6	▼2.2	2,753	2.7	▼2.9
FDP	Siegfried Seidl	2,070	2.0	▼8.0	4,195	4.1	▼9.8
Pirates					1,434	1.4	0.0
BP					1,346	1.3	▲0.2
NPD	Franz Salzberger	1,627	1.6	▼0.1	1,296	1.3	▼0.4
PARTEI		772	0.8				
Tierschutzpartei					722	0.7	▲0.1
REP					438	0.4	▼0.9
DIE FRAUEN					185	0.2	
Party of Reason					131	0.1	
DIE VIOLETTEN					113	0.1	▼0.1
PRO					82	0.1	
RRP					40	0.0	▼0.4
BüSo					32	0.0	▼0.1
MLPD					17	0.0	0.0
Informal votes		1,233			902		
Total valid votes		102,641			102,972		
Turnout		103,874	63.6	▼0.8			
CSU hold	Majority	46,129	44.9	▲8.8			

=== 2009 election ===
Federal election (2009): Rottal-Inn
Notes:	Blue background denotes the winner of the electorate vote. Pink background denotes a candidate elected from their party list. Yellow background denotes an electorate win by a list member, or other incumbent. A ✓ or ✗ denotes status of any incumbent, win or lose respectively.						
Party	Candidate	Votes	%	±%	Party votes	%	±%
CSU	✓ Max Straubinger	54,904	53.6	▼11.4	51,702	50.1	▼10.4
SPD	Florian Pronold	17,920	17.5	▼4.7	14,151	13.7	▼6.2
FDP	Günther Kammerer	10,305	10.1	▲5.4	14,359	13.9	▲6.5
Greens	Stefan Haug	5,828	5.7	▲1.7	6,786	6.6	▲2.5
Left	Rudi Schöberl	4,868	4.8		5,742	5.6	▲3.0
ÖDP	Alois Aigner	4,626	4.5		2,472	2.4	
NPD	Peter Haese	1,743	1.7	▼1.2	1,761	1.7	▼0.3
Pirates					1,392	1.3	
REP	Patrick Alexander Korfmann	1,719	1.7		1,388	1.3	0.0
BP					1,140	1.1	▲0.4
FAMILIE					674	0.7	0.0
Tierschutzpartei					599	0.6	
RRP					486	0.5	
DIE VIOLETTEN					194	0.2	
CM					157	0.2	
BüSo	Reinhard Maßberg	522	0.5	▼0.8	124	0.1	▼0.1
PBC					59	0.1	0.0
DVU					54	0.1	
MLPD					20	0.0	0.0
Informal votes		2,052			1,227		
Total valid votes		102,435			103,260		
Turnout		104,487	64.5	▼9.6			
CSU hold	Majority	36,984	36.1	▼6.7			

=== 2005 election ===
Federal election (2005):Rottal-Inn
Notes:	Blue background denotes the winner of the electorate vote. Pink background denotes a candidate elected from their party list. Yellow background denotes an electorate win by a list member, or other incumbent. A ✓ or ✗ denotes status of any incumbent, win or lose respectively.						
Party	Candidate	Votes	%	±%	Party votes	%	±%
CSU	✓ Max Straubinger	75,543	65.0	▼8.1	71,195	60.5	▼12.3
SPD	Florian Pronold	25,816	22.2	▲4.5	23,382	19.9	▲2.0
FDP	Günther Kammerer	5,390	4.6	▲1.1	8,694	7.4	▲4.3
Greens	Stefan Haug	4,643	4.0	▼1.7	4,849	4.1	▲0.6
NPD	Peter Haese	3,349	2.9		2,405	2.0	▲1.8
Left					2,966	2.5	▲2.1
BüSo	Reinhard Maßberg	1,554	1.3		295	0.3	▲0.2
REP					1,536	1.3	▲0.8
BP					816	0.7	▲0.5
Familie					807	0.7	
Feminist					329	0.3	▲0.2
GRAUEN					274	0.2	▲0.2
PBC					120	0.1	▲0.1
MLPD					54	0.0	
Informal votes		3,310			1,883		
Total valid votes		116,295			117,722		
Turnout		119,605	74.0	▼5.2			
CSU hold	Majority	49,727	42.8				
