= Weist =

Weist is a surname of German origin. Notable people with the surname include:

- Dwight Weist, American actor and announcer
- T. J. Weist, American football coach
- Werner Weist, German footballer
- Thomas Henry Weist-Hill (1828–1891), English violinist and conductor
- Ralph Weist Schlosser, American academic

== See also ==
- Weist Apartments
- Wiest (disambiguation)
