= Joseph Anton Merz =

German artist (1681–1750)

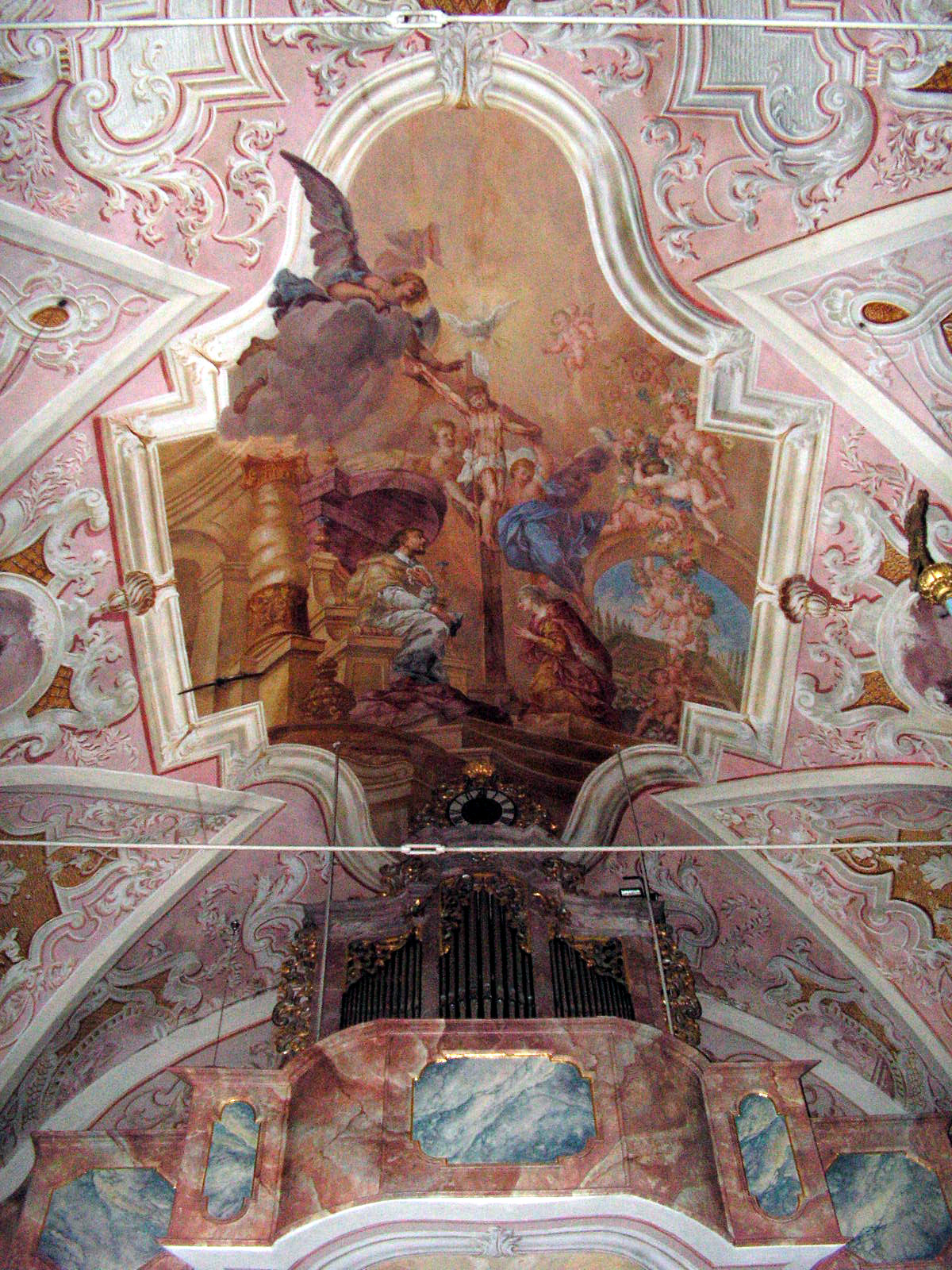
- Ceiling fresco in a western vault of the Church of St. John of Nepomuk
- Born: 1681; Marktoberdorf
- Died: 1750 (aged 68–69); Straubing
- Notable work: Frescos in Oberalteich Abbey and Church of St. John of Nepomuk
- Style: Frescoes, Christian Art

Joseph Anton Merz (1681 – 7 January 1750) was a German Baroque painter.

Merz was born in Marktoberdorf, in Swabia.

He was active until 1734, mainly around Straubing, in Bavaria, and predominantly painted altarpieces and frescos. He was a "much sought-after painter of altarpieces and. Frescoes in churches around Straubing." His better known works include a fresco cycle in the Oberalteich Abbey, frescoes of Benedictine Collegiate Church, and the ceiling fresco of the Church of St. John of Nepomuk in Thürnthenning (now in greater Moosthenning).

He briefly hired Johann Evangelist Holzer as his assistant.
