= Conrad Fink =

German librarian and politician

Member of the Bundestag; for Pfarrkirchen
- In office 7 September 1949 – 6 October 1953
- Preceded by: Constituency established
- Succeeded by: Max Riederer von Paar

Personal details
- Born: 7 July 1900 Munich, Germany
- Died: 25 July 1981 (aged 81)
- Party: Christian Social Union (1946–1948; after 1952)
- Other political affiliations: BVP (1919–1933); BP (1948–1952)
- Education: LMU Munich; Marburg University

Conrad Warmund Christian Maria Fink (7 July 1900 – 25 July 1981) was a German librarian and politician who represented the Bavaria Party and the Christian Social Union of Bavaria. He was district administrator for Pfarrkirchen and from 1949 to 1953 a Member of the Deutscher Bundestag.

== Life and work ==
After attending elementary school and graduating from high school in Munich, Fink embarked on a degree in philosophy, religion, science, and the History of Art at the universities of Munich and Marburg and was subsequently awarded a Doctorate in Philosophy.

Following his academic career Fink worked in a bookshop and a scientific library, rising to the position in the latter field of chief advisor. During the period of National Socialist rule Fink was placed under surveillance by the Gestapo between the years 1937 and 1945. Following the bombing of Germany by Allied forces, Fink relocated to Postmünster, a municipality in the district of Rottal-Inn, Bavaria.

== Political career ==
Conrad Fink was a member of the Bavarian People's Party (BVP) from 1919 to 1933. After the Second World War he re-established his political career through joining the CSU in 1946 and representing this party as District Chairman. Since 1946 he had been Commissioner for Refugees in addition to his administrative position in Pfarrkirchen. In March 1946 Fink joined the Bayernpartei (BP).

Germany's first post-war General Election in 1949 saw Fink elected as a Member of the Deutscher Bundestag representing the constituency of Pfarrkirchen. In Parliament Fink was a member of the Föderalistischen Union (FU) and became the lead parliamentary administrator of the group within the Bundestag. On 14 December Fink joined the CSU in protest against a merger between the Bayernpartei and the Zentrumspartei.

On 5 January 1952 Fink left both the Föderalistischen Union and the Christlich-Soziale Union regional committee. Fink was a member of the committee for Berlin from 1950, a member of the Committee for German Affairs, and the committee for Foreign Trade until January 1952. In February and March 1952 Fink was briefly a member of the committee for Lastenausgleich, which can best be translated and described as a committee with the objective of fairly considering and distributing the financial burdens of the German regions (Länder). From February 1952 Fink was a member of the Committee for Petitions and from March 1952 a member of the committee for Legal and Constitutional Affairs.

Conrad Fink retired from the Bundestag at the expiration of his term in 1953.

== Publications ==
- Rottaler Heimatbüchlein und Pfarrkirchener Museumsführer, Pfarrkirchen, 1949.
