= Johann Evangelist Holzer =

German painter

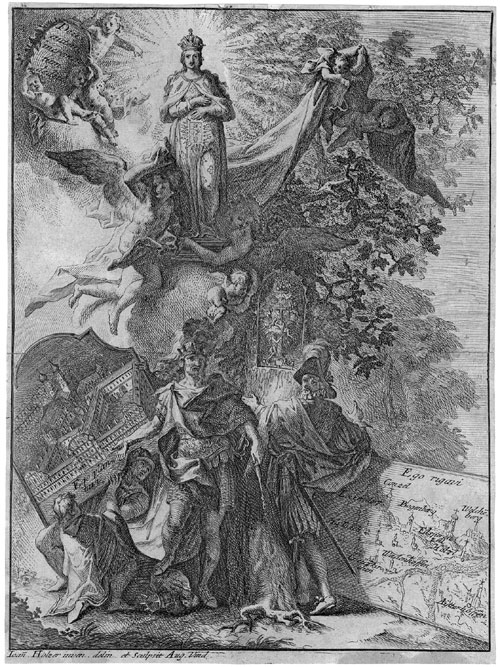
Etching of a fresco by Holzer, Die Gründung von Kloster Oberalteich (Establishment of the Oberalteich Abbey)

Johann Evangelist Holzer (December 24, 1709 – July 21, 1740) was an Austrian-German painter.

Holzer was born in Burgeis, Mals, in the Vinschgau Valley of South Tyrol, as the son of a miller. He was sent to undertake a classical course of study at Marienberg Abbey, but wished to study art; a portrait he painted of Johann Baptist Murr, then the abbot of the abbey, convinced his father to yield to his wishes. He studied under Nikolaus Auer and made rapid progress. At the age of 18 he painted the altarpiece of the Marienberg Abbey church, depicting Saint Joseph as patron of the afflicted, ill, and dying. He then went to Straubing, where he learned under Joseph Anton Merz how to paint frescos, which would become the main source of his later fame. He helped Merz paint the frescos of Oberalteich Abbey, and while in Straubing also painted Saint Anthony of Padua for the Franciscan church there.

1738/39 was in the painting of Eichstätt for the high altar of the Schutzengelkirche It is Holzer's largest painting on canvas (H: 8,36 m; B: 4,28 m) and impresses through movement, gesture, a dynamic composition, and a sophisticated lighting design. Although there are two pictures (side altars) signatures of Bergmüller, they will Holzer, assigned by the archives occupied painter of the high altar painting.

Following this period, he went to Augsburg, where he stayed with Johann Georg Bergmüller for six years, and became considerably better known. His services were particularly in demand in Augsburg for painting frescos for public buildings and on the exteriors of houses, though few of these now survive. Among his works in other locations are a fresco in the garden hall of the Bishop of Eichstädt, an altarpiece for the Jesuitenkirche in Eichstädt, an altarpiece depicting Saint Michael in the abbey church of Diessen, and a fresco in the Church of St. Anton in Partenkirchen. His last and largest works are frescos for Münsterschwarzach Abbey. At the time of his death Holzer had been commissioned by Clemens August of Bavaria to paint frescos in the Hofkirche of Clemenswerth, but he died in 1740 before his arrival there.

== Note ==
- This article, or an earlier version, was translated from an article in the Allgemeine Deutsche Biographie, a work now in the public domain.
