= Sebastian Nachreiner =

German footballer

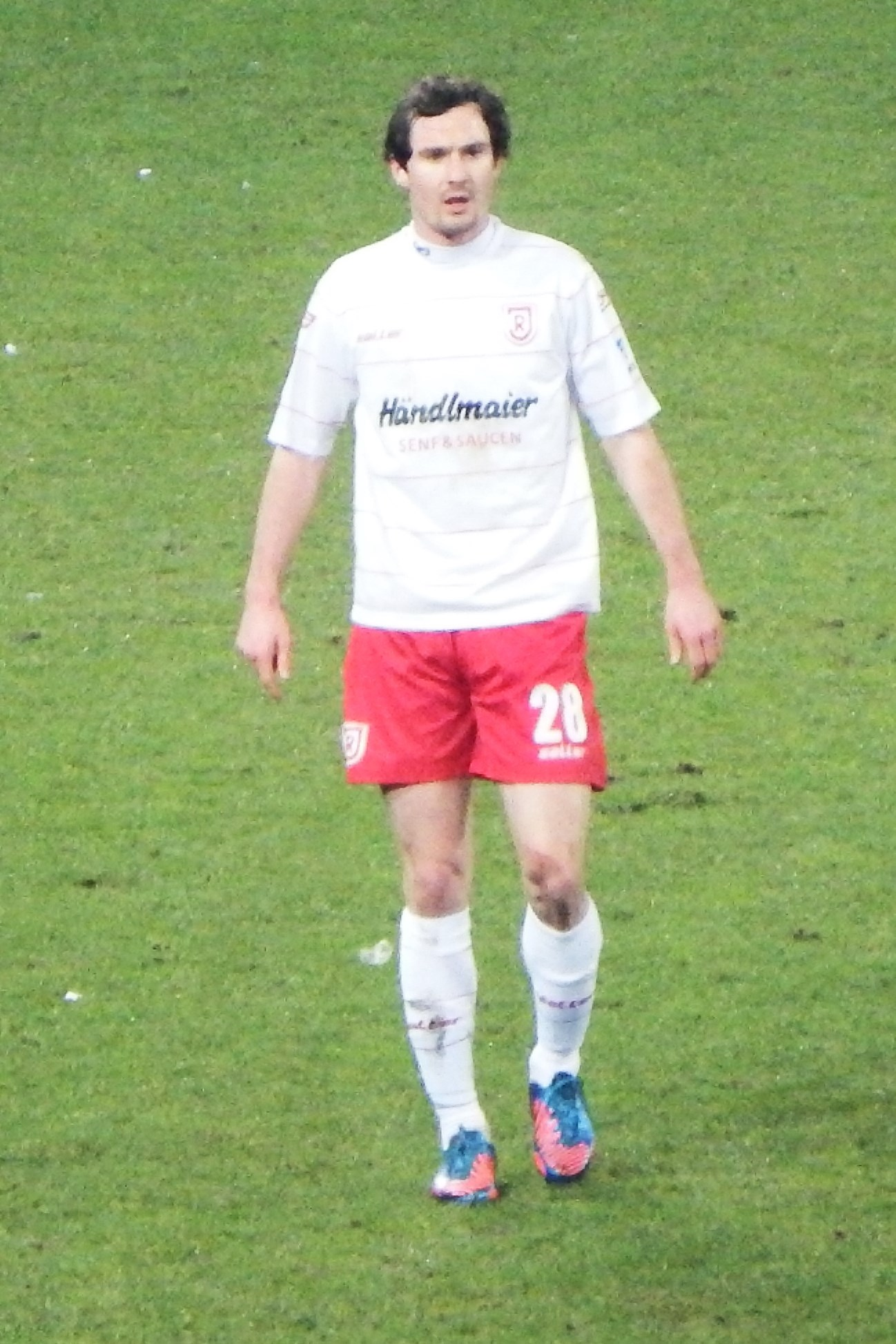
- Nachreiner in 2013

Personal information
- Date of birth: 23 November 1988 (age 37)
- Place of birth: Gottfrieding, West Germany
- Height: 1.88 m (6 ft 2 in)
- Position: Defender

Youth career
- –1999: FC Gottfrieding
- 1999–2010: FC Dingolfing

Senior career*
Years	Team	Apps	(Gls)
2010–2023	Jahn Regensburg	252	(0)
- * Club domestic league appearances and goals

Sebastian Nachreiner (born 23 November 1988) is a German former professional footballer who played as a defender.

Nachreiner made his professional debut during the 2010–11 3. Liga season in a 2–1 away win over FC Carl Zeiss Jena. Over a 13 year career, he played in more than 260 competitive matches with Jahn Regensburg.

Nachreiner was born in Gottfrieding. Outside football, he is working on this doctoral dissertation in legal theory about the rights and duties of referees.
