= Max Straubinger =

German politician (born 1954)

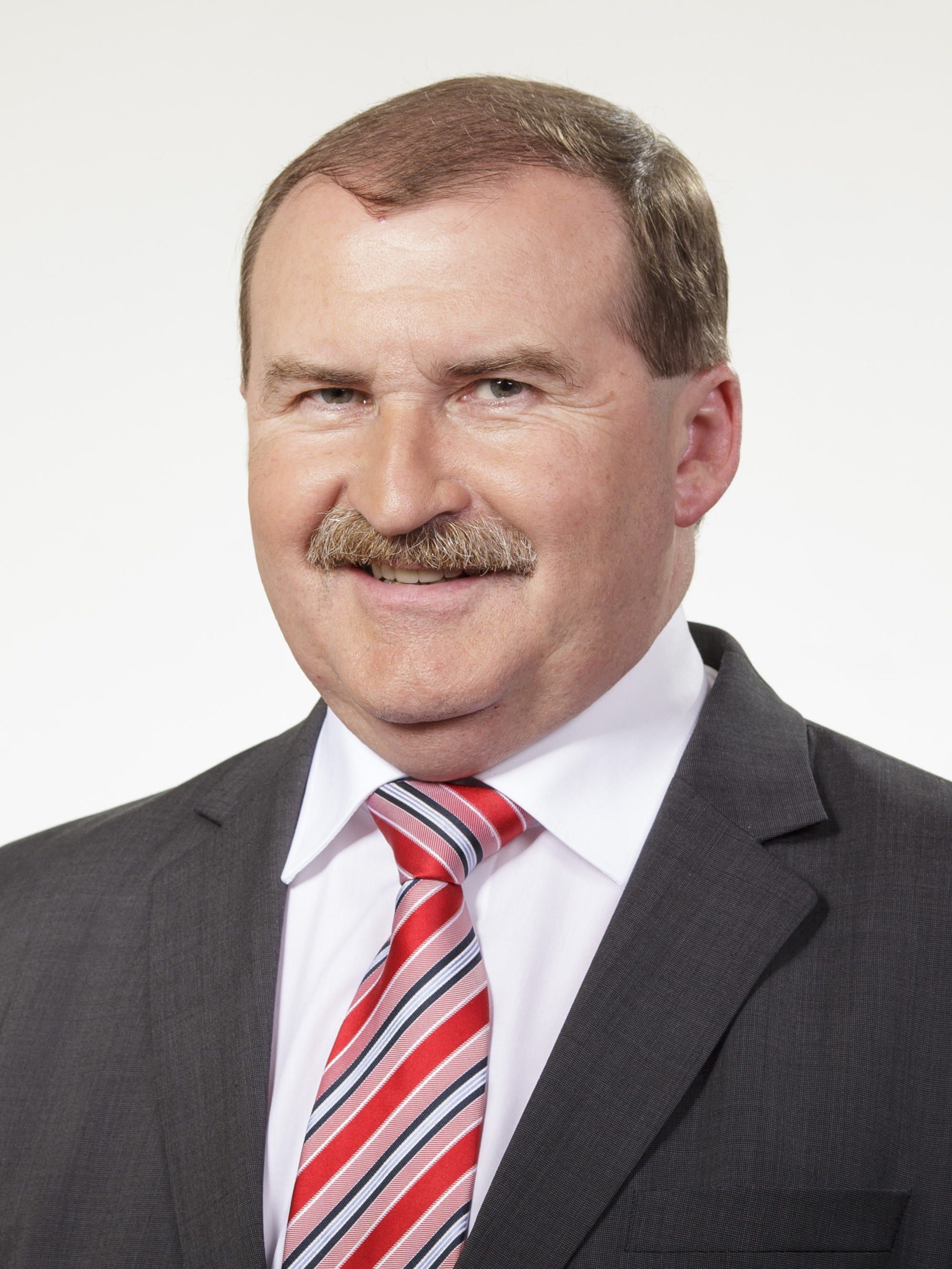
- Straubinger in 2012

Member of the Bundestag; for Rottal-Inn
- In office 10 November 1994 – 25 March 2025
- Preceded by: Günther Müller
- Succeeded by: Günter Baumgartner

Personal details
- Born: 12 August 1954 (age 72) Simbach, Dingolfing-Landau, West Germany
- Party: Christian Social Union
- Children: 3

Max Straubinger (born 12 August 1954) is a German politician of the Christian Social Union in Bavaria (CSU) who has been serving as a member of the Bundestag from the state of Bavaria from 1994 to 2025.

== Political career ==
Straubinger first became a member of the Bundestag in the 1994 German federal election. He was a member of the Committee for Labour and Social Affairs and the Committee for Food and Agriculture.

In 2014, Straubinger co-chaired the CSU’s convention in Munich.

In January 2024, Straubinger announced that he would not stand in the 2025 federal elections but instead resign from active politics by the end of the parliamentary term.
