= German Federal Archives =

Archives of German federal government agencies

Coordinates: 50°20′32.712″N 7°34′21.216″E

- German: Bundesarchiv

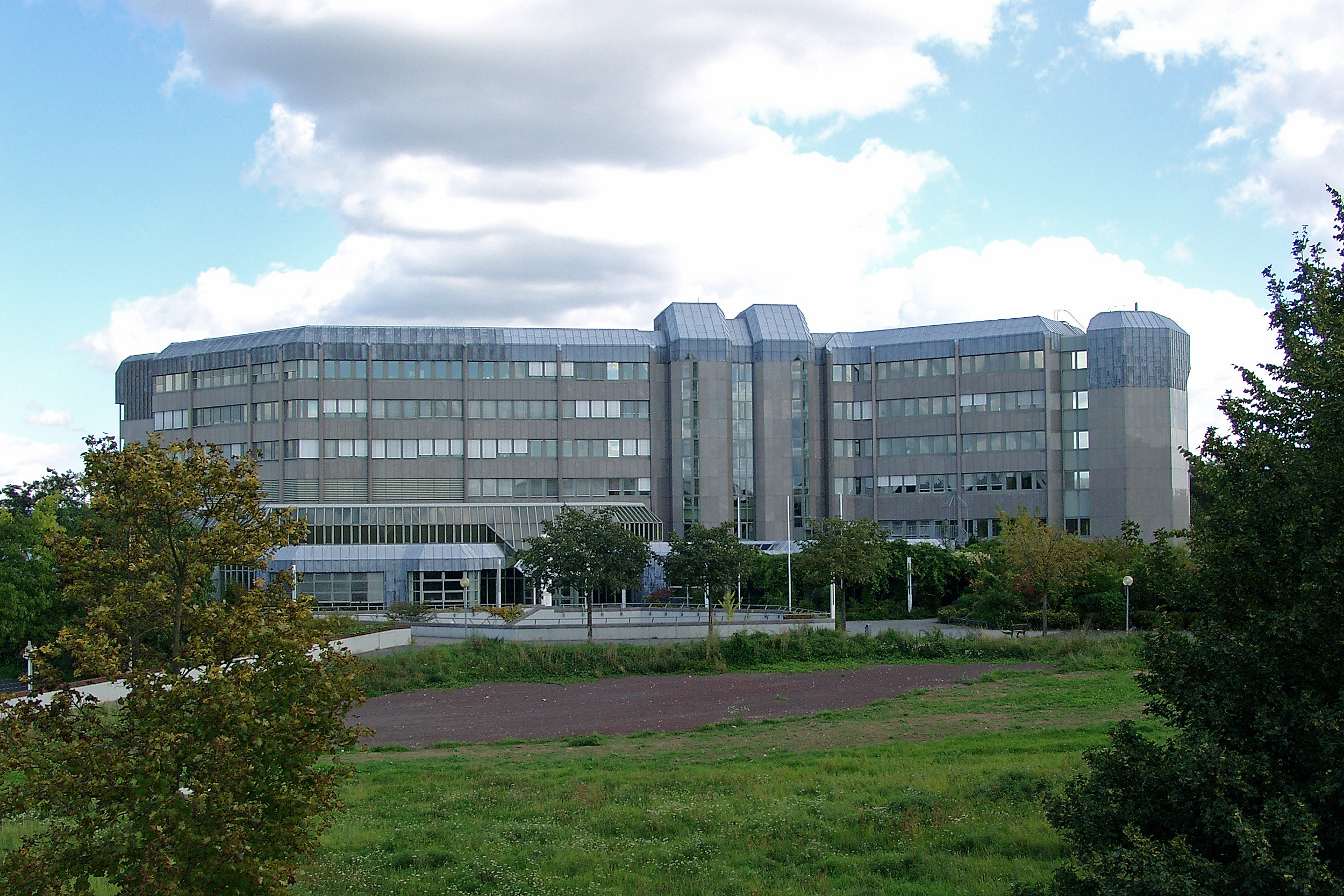
- The Federal Archives in Koblenz

Archive overview
- Formed: 2 March 1952 (74 years ago)
- Status: Active
- Headquarters: Potsdamer Straße 1 56075 Koblenz
- Annual budget: €54.6 million (as of 2009)
- Archive executives: Michael Hollmann, President of the Federal Archives; Dr. Andrea Hänger, Vice President of the Federal Archives
- Parent department: Federal Government Commissioner for Culture and the Media
- Website: www.bundesarchiv.de

Map
- Location on a map of Rhineland-Palatinate

The German Federal Archives or Bundesarchiv (BArch) (German: Bundesarchiv, lit. "Federal Archive") are the national archives of Germany. They were established at the current location in Koblenz in 1952.

They are subordinated to the Federal Commissioner for Culture and the Media (Wolfram Weimer since 2025) under the German Chancellery, and before 1998, to the Federal Ministry of the Interior.

On 6 December 2008, the Archives donated 100,000 photos to the public, by making them accessible via Wikimedia Commons.

== History ==
The federal archive for institutions and authorities in Germany, the first precursor to the present-day Federal Archives, was established in Potsdam, Brandenburg in 1919, a later date than in other European countries. This national archive documented German government dating from the founding of the North German Confederation in 1867. It also included material from the older German Confederation and the Imperial Chamber Court. The oldest documents in this collection dated back to the year 1411. Photographs and film of a younger vintage were also contained in the original archive, much of which was contributed by non-governmental sources. Despite efforts to save the most valuable parts of the collection, almost half of the archive's total contents were destroyed during World War II. The most valuable part of the civilian archive was saved by relocating them, but the military part of the archives was almost completely destroyed.

In 1946, the German Central Archive was founded in Potsdam, then in the Soviet occupation zone and later in East Germany. This archive, renamed the Central State Archive in 1973, was viewed as the successor to the original archive, in part because it was located in the same city. By the end of the 1950s, records that had originally been seized by the government of the Soviet Union in the aftermath of World War II had been returned to the archive.

In West Germany, the Cabinet of Germany decided to create a new Federal Archive in Koblenz in 1950, a project that was realized in 1952. The United States and the United Kingdom, like the Soviet Union, also seized records from Germany following World War II in their respective zones of occupation. In 1955, a Military Archives Division was established as part of the Federal Archives as a place into which these records were returned. In 1988, the Federal Archives Act elevated the tasks of the Federal Archive into law, and granted it rights to the documents produced by West Germany's courts, public authorities, and constitutional institutions.

The reunification of Germany in 1990 also led to the unification of West Germany's Federal Archive with East Germany's Central State Archive. In the course of this development, the formerly separate National Film Archive and Military Archives of East Germany were also merged into the Federal Archives.

With the unification of the two German archives in 1990, the traditions of the East Germany state authorities were absorbed into the Federal Archives. However, legal problems were encountered during this process in securing the archives and libraries of East Germany's political parties and mass organizations. Even though East Germany's political structure meant that these institutions had very close ties to the government, they were not public institutions. Further problems arose as these records were separated from other East German documents, resulting in the Federal Archives presenting an incomplete picture of East Germany's history. In 1991, an initiative was implemented that placed the records in question into the possession of the Federal Archives. As a result of this initiative, a bill amending the Federal Archives Act of 1988 that established the department foundation provided for the Federal Archives came into force on 13 March 1992.

== Content ==
The collection of the German Federal Archives today includes older documents from Germany's imperial past, Nazi Germany, civilian and military records from East Germany (including East German political parties and mass organizations), and the documents inherited from West Germany's Federal Archive. In addition to state records, the Archives also contain material from political parties, associations, and societies of national prominence as well as historical collections. Besides the text documents, the Archives also keeps photographs, films, maps, posters, and electronic data in its collection.

== Organization ==
- Bayreuth (Lastenausgleich)
- Berlin–Lichterfelde SAPMO-DDR and Reich; Film Archives (German: SAPMO, DDR und Reich; Filmarchiv))
- Berlin–Lichtenberg (until 2021 Stasi Records Agency)
- Berlin–Reinickendorf (German: Personenbezogene Auskünfte; until 2019 Deutsche Dienststelle (WASt))
- Freiburg im Breisgau German Federal Military Archive (German: Militärarchiv)
- Hoppegarten (Zwischenarchiv und Filmarchiv-Servicezentrum)
- Koblenz Federal Republic of Germany (German: Bundesrepublik Deutschland)
- Ludwigsburg Nazi Archives (German: Außenstelle bei der Zentralen Stelle der Landesjustizverwaltungen zur Aufklärung nationalsozialistischer Verbrechen)
- Rastatt (German: Erinnerungsstätte für die Freiheitsbewegungen in der deutschen Geschichte)
- Sankt Augustin-Hangelar (German: Zwischenarchiv)

== Directors since 1952 ==
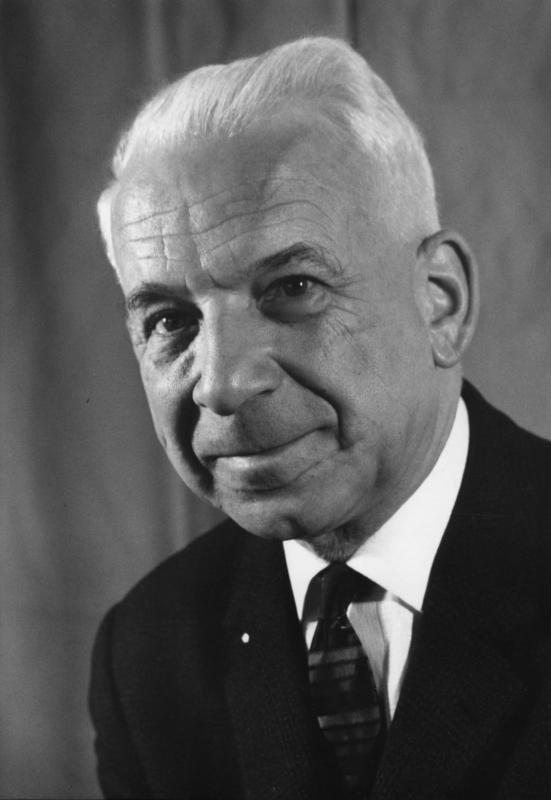
Karl Bruchmann, Director of the German Federal Archives from 1961–1967

- Georg Winter (Archivist) (Director, 1952–1960)
- Karl Bruchmann (historian) (Director, 1961–1967)
- Wolfgang A. Mommsen (President, 1967–1972)
- Hans Booms (President, 1972–1989)
- Friedrich P. Kahlenberg (President, 1989–1999)
- Hartmut Weber (Archivist) (President, December 1999 – March 2011)
- Michael Hollmann (President May 2011 – present)

== See also ==
- Deutsche Dienststelle (WASt) – Archive which maintains records of members of the former German Wehrmacht who were killed in action. Merged with Federal Archive in 2019.
- Stasi Records Agency – an organization that administered the archives of Ministry of State Security (Stasi) of the former German Democratic Republic (East Germany). Merged with Federal Archive in 2021.
