= Protschka =

Protschka is a German surname. Notable people with the surname include:

- Josef Protschka (born 1944), German operatic tenor
- Peter Protschka (born 1977), German trumpeter
- Stephan Protschka (born 1977), German politician
