= Johann Georg Bergmüller =

German painter

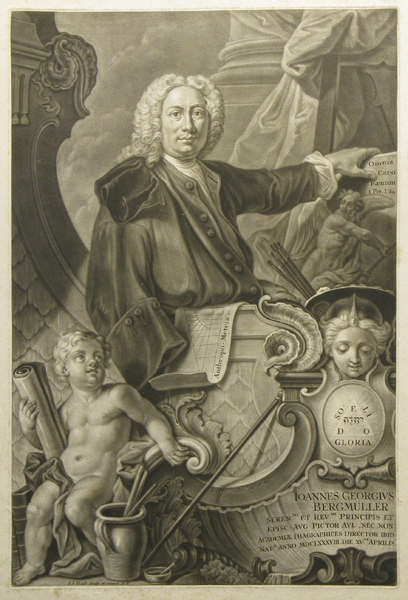
Johann Georg Bergmüller, by Johann Jakob Haid (c.1755), after a work by Bergmüller

Johann Georg Bergmüller (15 April 1688 – 2 April 1762) was a German painter, particularly of frescoes, of the Baroque.

== Life ==
Bergmüller was born in Türkheim near Buchloe (now in Bavaria) and received his first artistic education at his father's cabinet making workshop. From 1702 until 1708 he was apprenticed to the court painter Johann Andreas Wolff in Munich. In 1711 he went on cultural journey to the Netherlands in order to broaden his horizon.

He became a Master Painter and received the citizenship of Augsburg later that year. He also married Barbara Kreutzerin, with whom he had ten children, one of which, Johann Baptist Bergmüller, became a fresco painter too, as well as a renowned copperplate engraver and art theorist.

Bergmüller quickly acquired a high reputation in Augsburg and created numerous works of art, few of which have survived however. He became the most important teacher of fresco painting at the Imperial City of Augsburg Academy, founded in 1710. His style of composition and his motifs were influential on his pupils. In 1723 he published Anthropometria, a textbook on the theory of proportions. He became the Catholic director of the academy alongside his Protestant counterpart, in 1730, and remained in this function until his death in Augsburg in 1762.

His most famous pupils were Johann Georg Wolcker, Gottfried Bernhard Göz and Johann Evangelist Holzer.

== Gallery ==
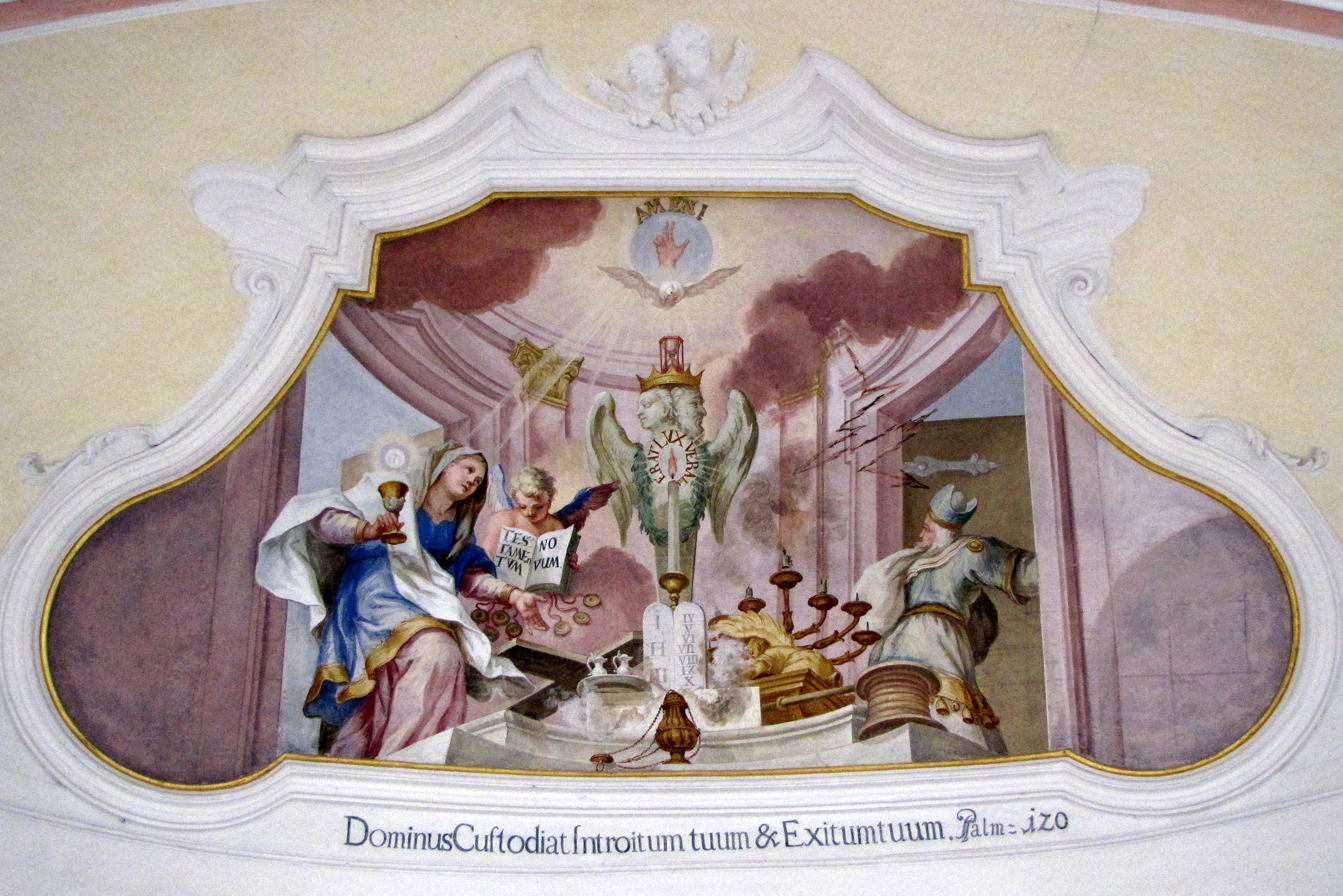
Ceiling painting by Johann Georg Bergmüller in Ochsenhausen Abbey

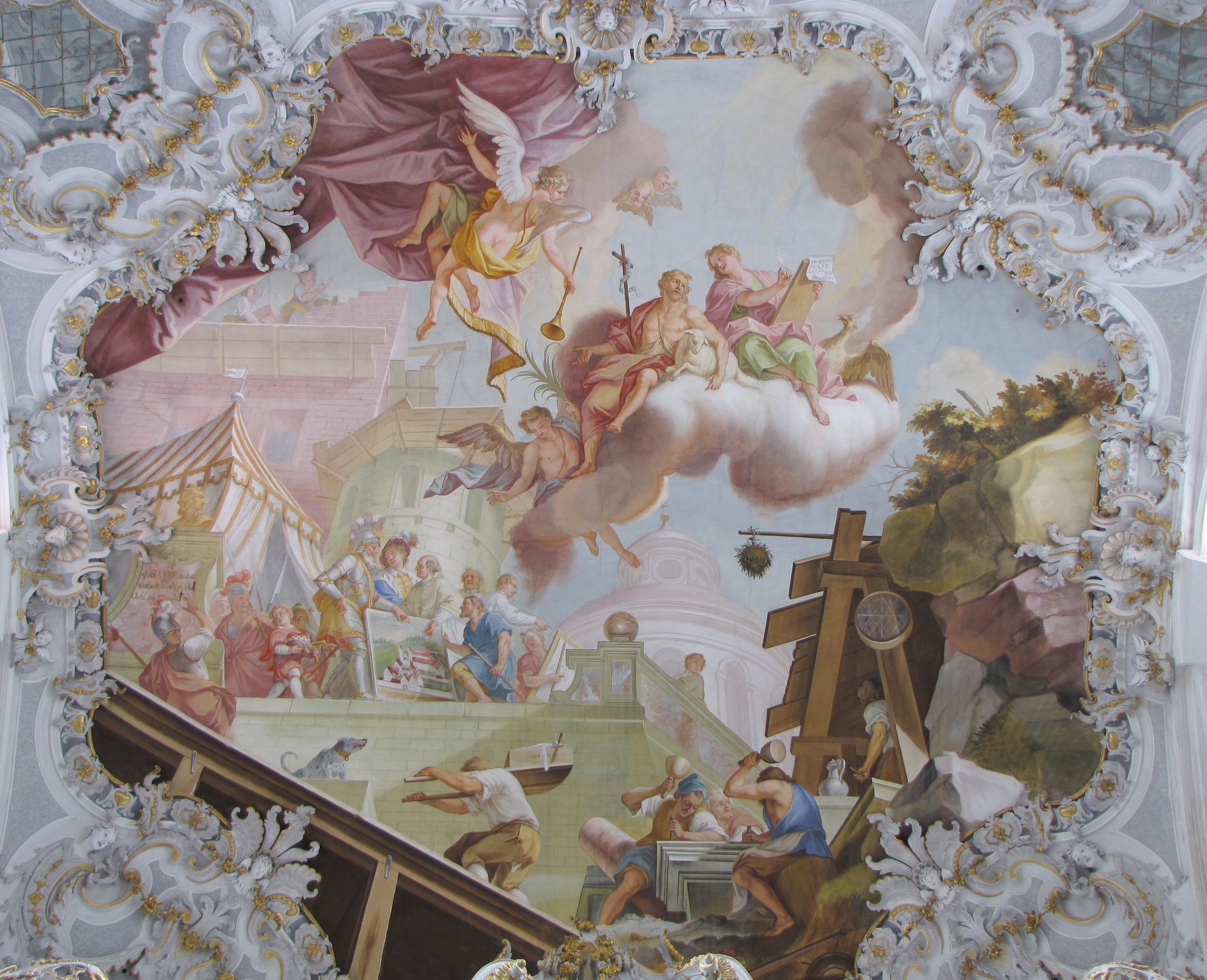
Ceiling painting in Steingaden Abbey

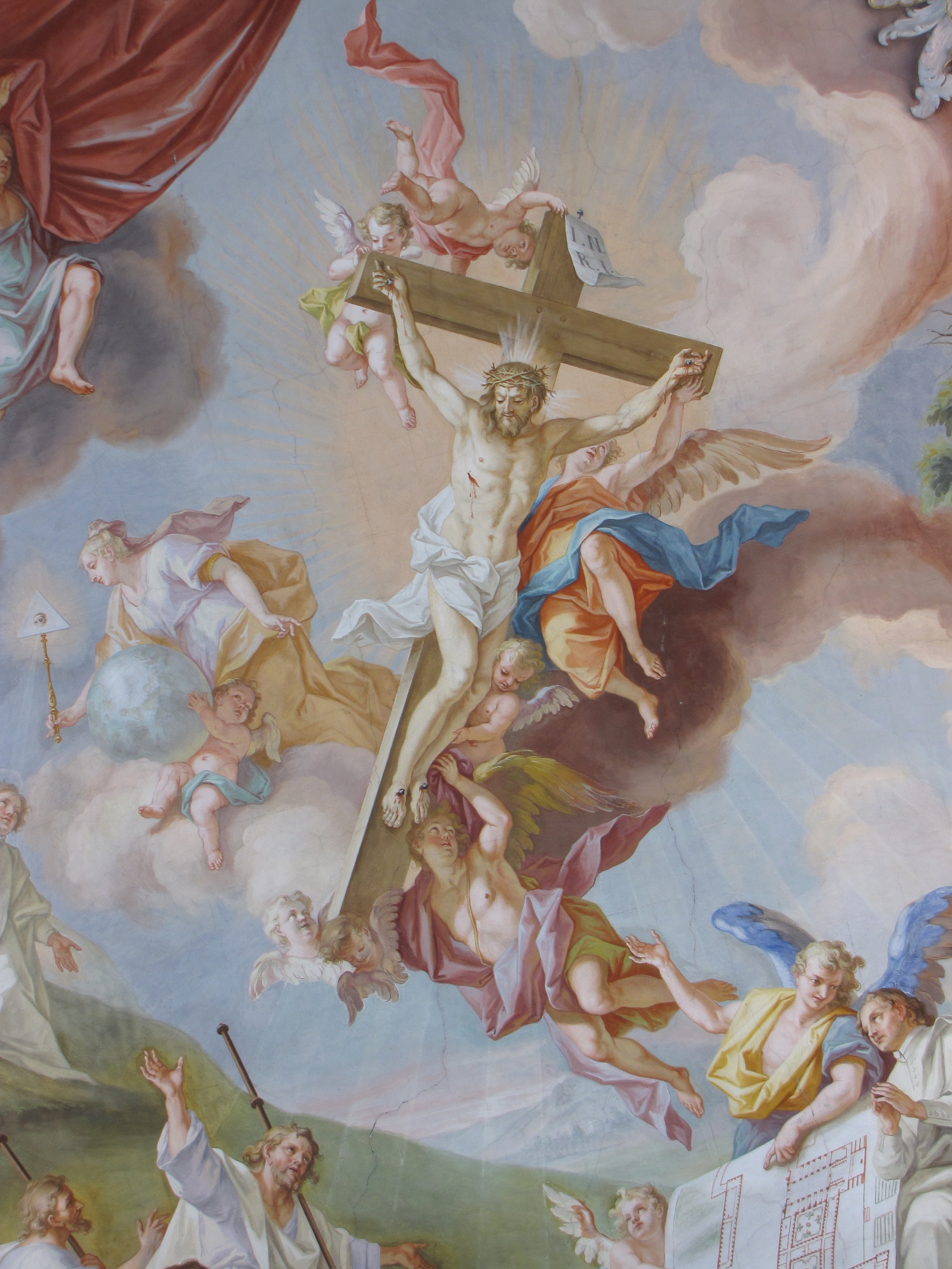
Ceiling painting in Steingaden Abbey

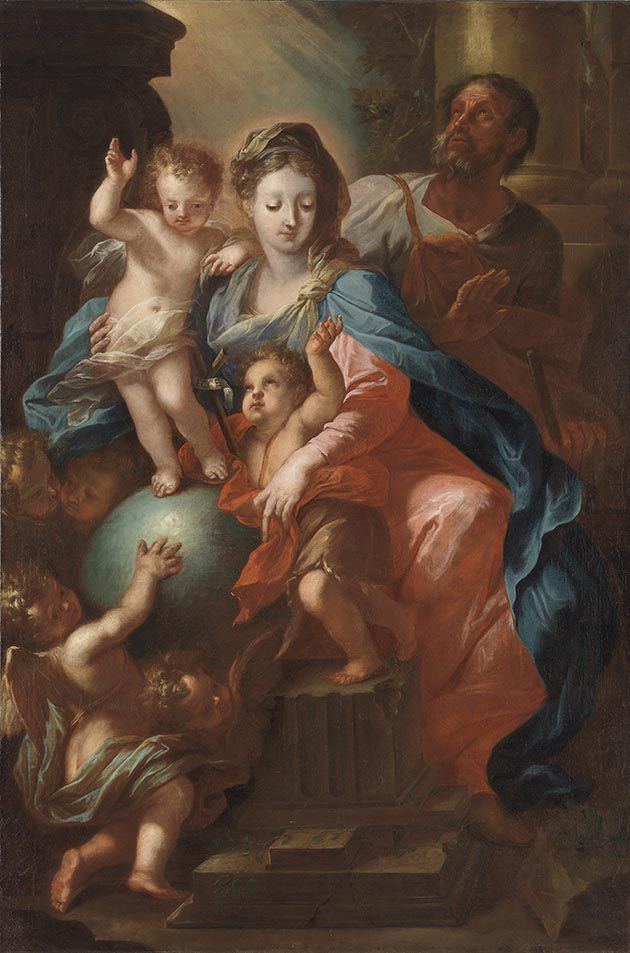
Holy Family with John and Angels (1728)

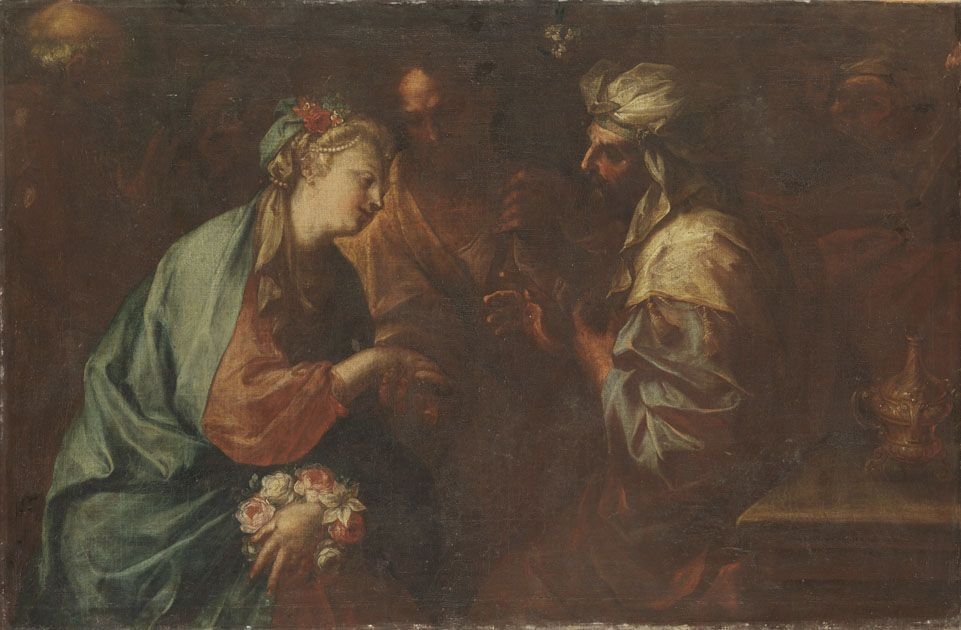
The Marriage of Mary (1713)

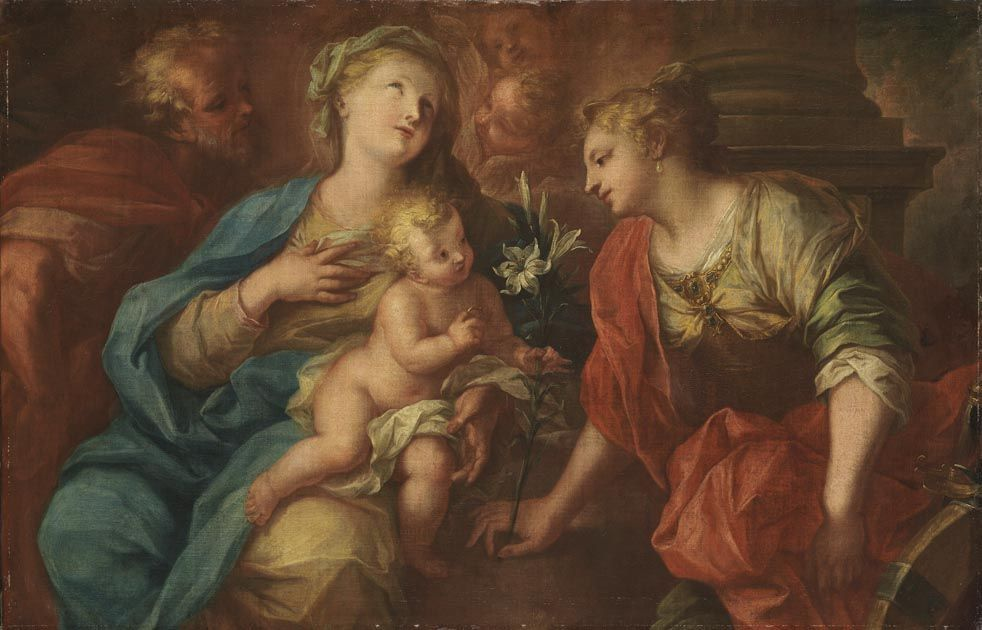
The Mystical Marriage of Saint Katherine (1713)

== Works ==
- 1710: ceiling frescoes in Kreuzpullach near Munich
- 1721: fresco-cycle at St Mary's Chapel (designed by Eichstätt court architect Gabriel de Gabrieli in Augsburg Cathedral
- 1721: Sacred Heart fresco-cycle at monastery church, Eichstätt
- altar painting at Dominican Church St Peter, Eichstätt
- altar painting at Jesuit Church, Eichstätt
- altar painting at parish and monastery church St Walpurga, Eichstätt
- 1727 - 1729: frescoes in abbey church St George at Ochsenhausen Abbey
- 1736: frescoes in Dießen am Ammersee
- altar paintings at parish church Aulzhausen

== Authorship ==
- Johann Georg Bergmüller: Anthropometria, Augsburg 1723
- His authorship of some paintings (side altars) thanks to restoration work at Guardian Angel Church in Eichstätt has been called into question.
