= Stephan Wiest =

Stephan Wiest (7 March 1748, Teisbach - 10 April 1797, Aldersbach) was a Catholic priest, Cistercian, and professor.

== History ==
He was born on 7 March 1748 at Teisbach in Lower Bavaria. He attended the Cistercian monastery of Aldersbach in 1767 to study philosophy and theology. He took the vows on 28 October 1768, and was later ordained priest in 1772. He then studied further at the University of Ingolstadt. From 1774 to 1780 he taught philosophy and mathematics at Aldersbach, and then theology from 1780 to 1781. In 1781 he was made professor of dogmatic theology at the University of Ingolstadt, where he also taught patristics and the history of theological literature. He was then made rector of the university from 1787 to 1788, and then resigned his professorship in 1794, returning to the monastery of Aldersbach.

== Works ==
- Institutiones theologicae
- Institutiones theologicae dogmaticae in usum academicum
- Introductio in historiam litterariam theologiae revelatae potissimum catholicae
- Institutiones Patrologiae in usum academicum
- De Wolfango Mario Abbate Alderspacensi Ord. Cist.

== External links and references ==
- Catholic Encyclopedia on Stephan Wiest
