= Teisbach =

Coordinates: 48°37′23″N 12°27′38″E

Teisbach is a former town in Lower Bavaria in Germany. It is now part of the city of Dingolfing.

Teisbach had been a separate municipality immediately west of Dingolfing and east of Loiching until January 1, 1972, when it was included with the city of Dingolfing.

Besides the old market town of Teisbach, on the high right bank of the Isar river, with its medieval castle and its Roman Catholic parish church of St. Vitus, the municipality also included the small villages of Höfen and Schönbühl and the hamlet of Gaubitzhausen left of the Isar, in the valley bottom. While the western part of Höfen had been traditionally part of Teisbach municipality as an exclave, the rest of Höfen as well as Schönbühl and Gaubitzhausen had been moved from Loiching to Teisbach by the U.S. military government on January 1, 1946.

The area of the former municipality of Teisbach is now a cadastral subdivision of Dingolfing.

== Images ==
Coat of arms of Teisbach

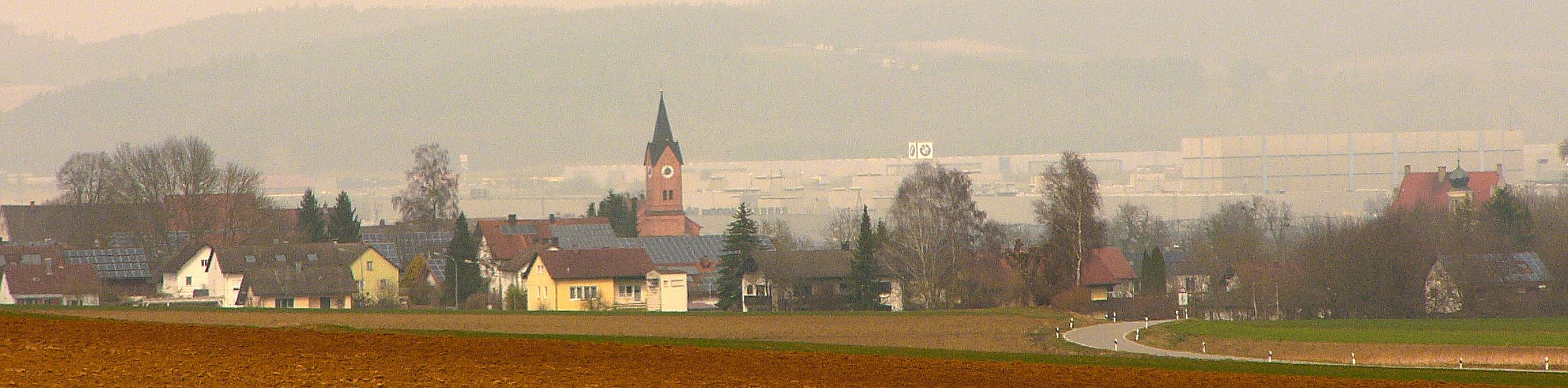
aerial view

Location of Teisbach within the former Landkreis Dingolfing

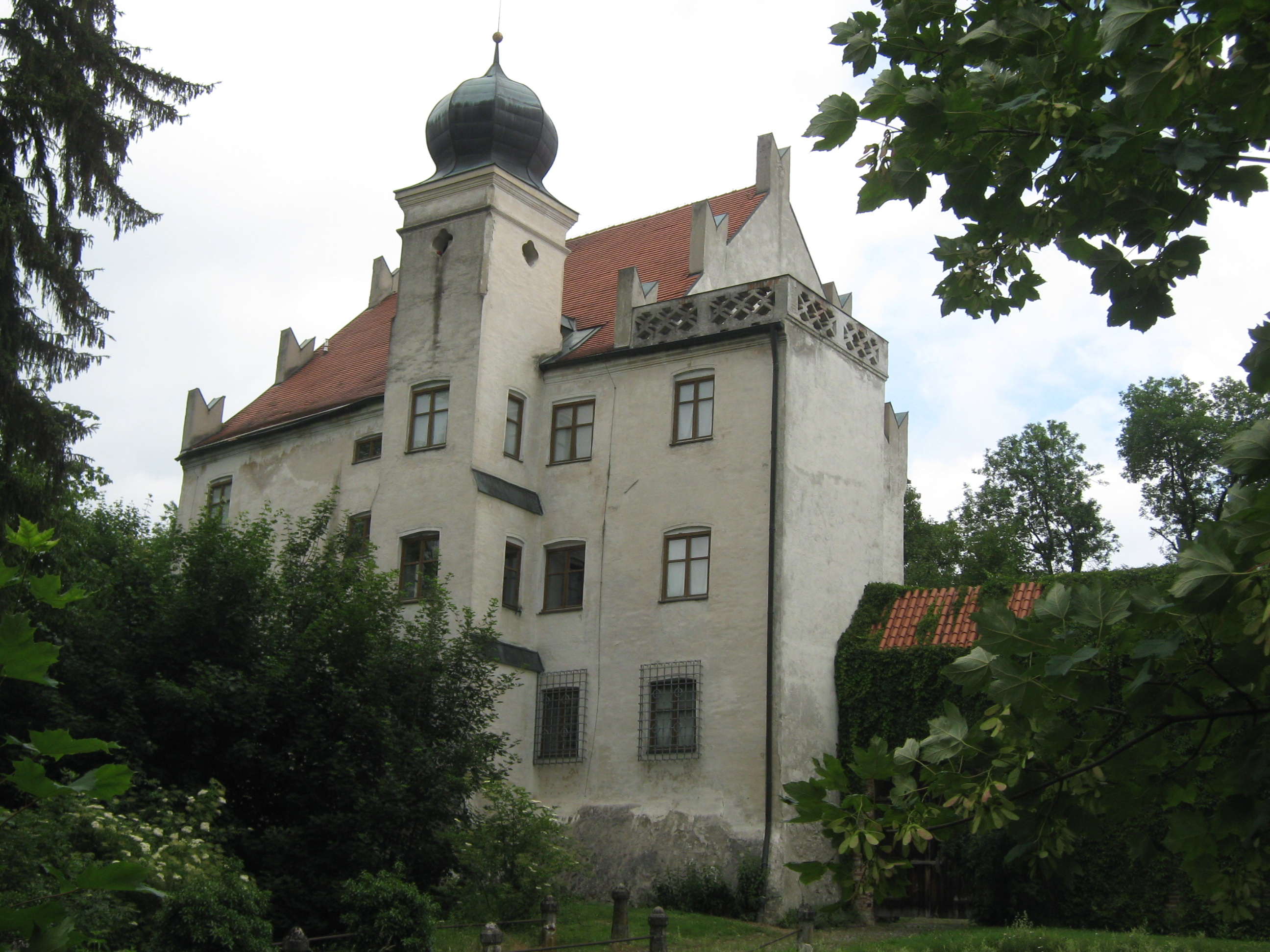
Castle of Teisbach

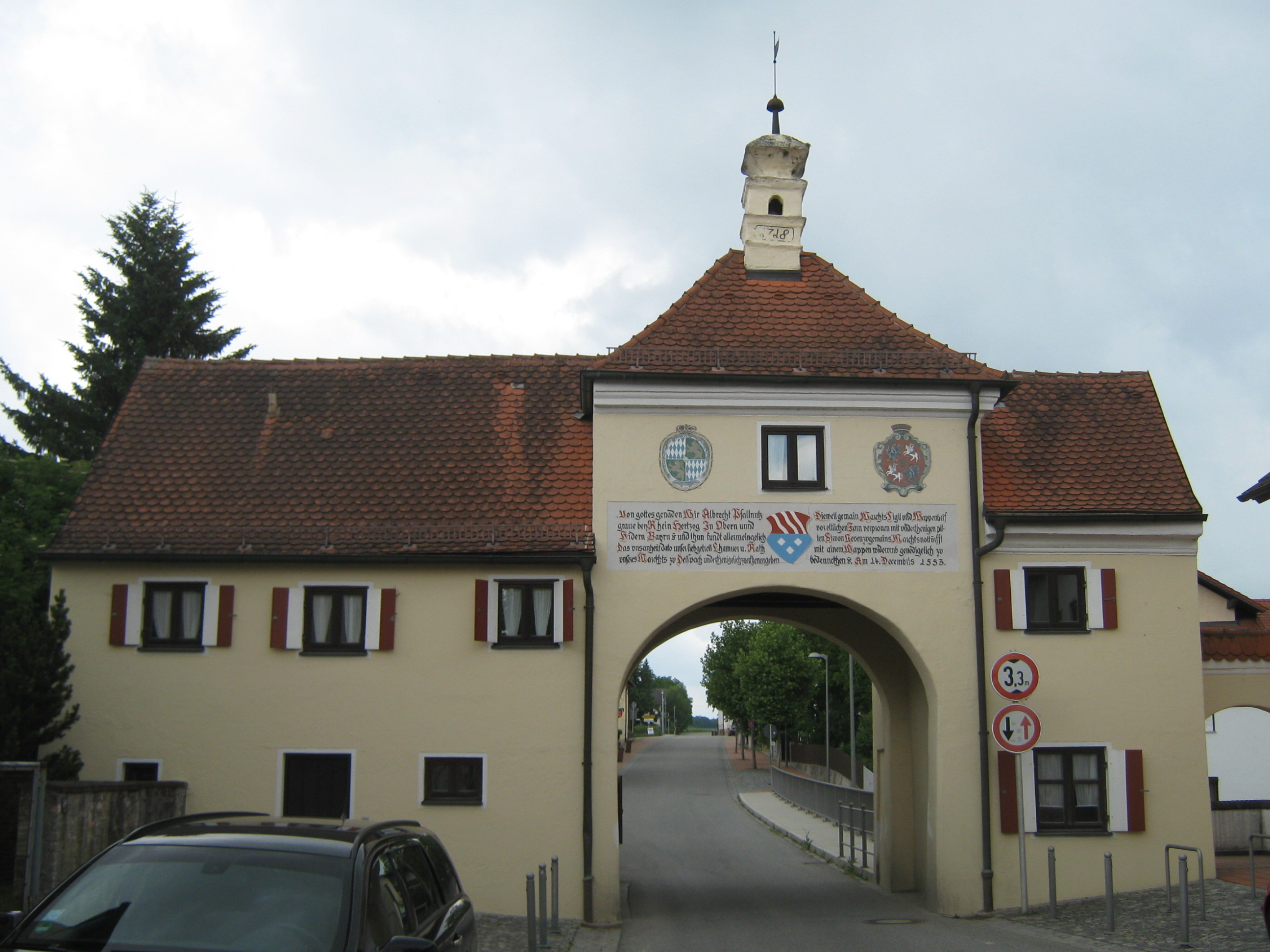
Markttor (historical western gate)

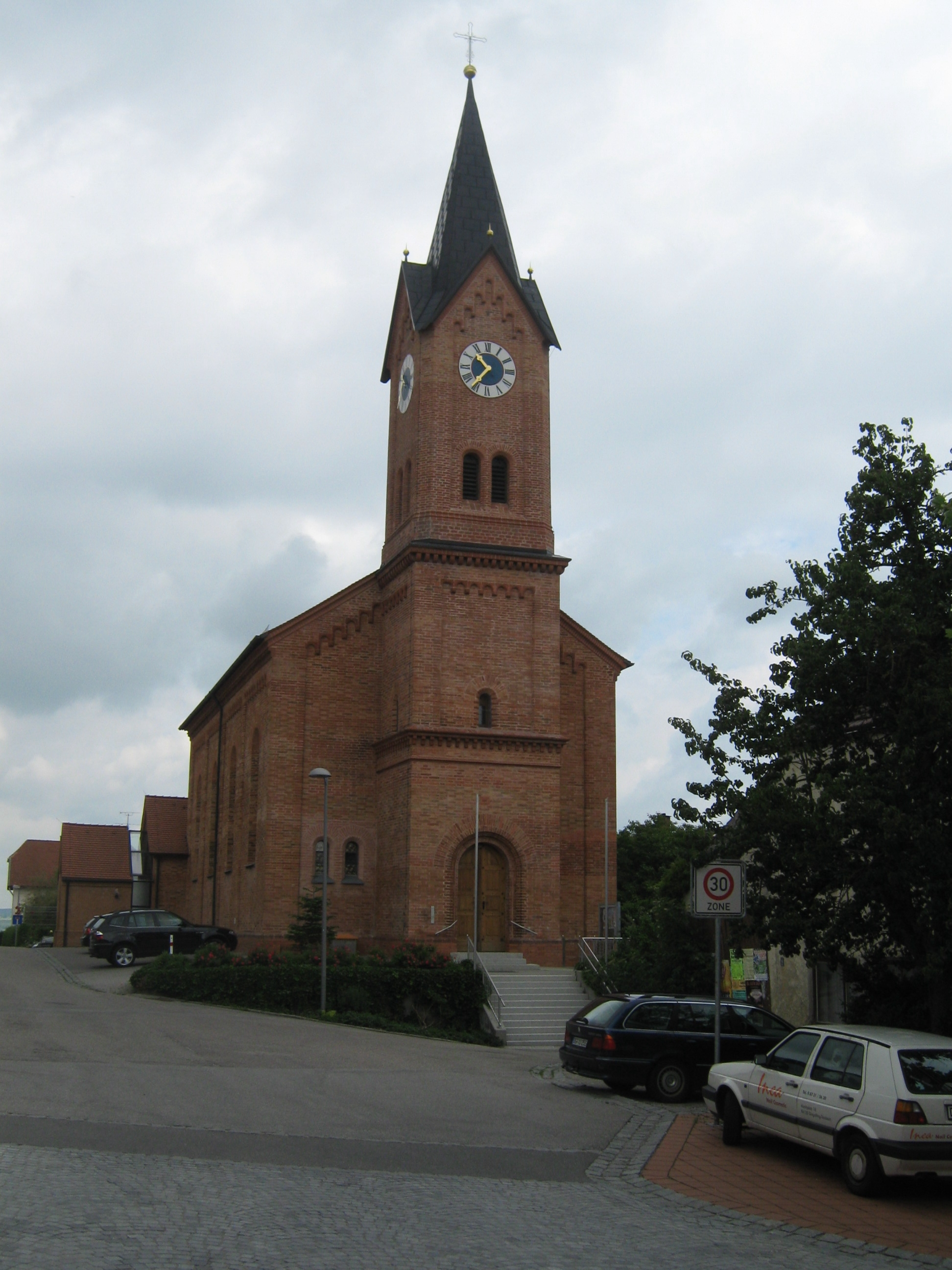
Parish church St. Vitus

== Historical ==
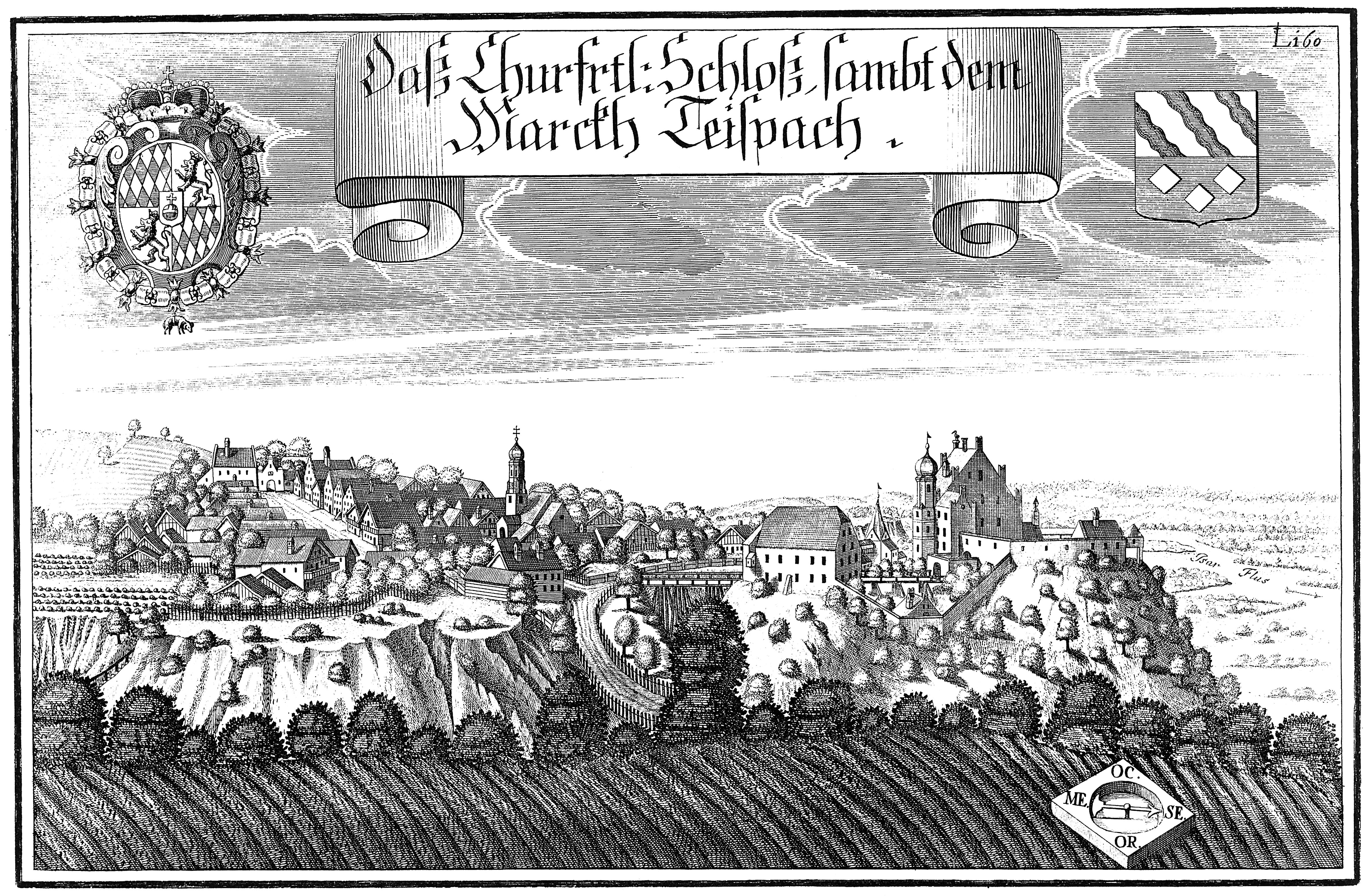
Teisbach seen from the east in 1710 (Engraving by Michael Wening)

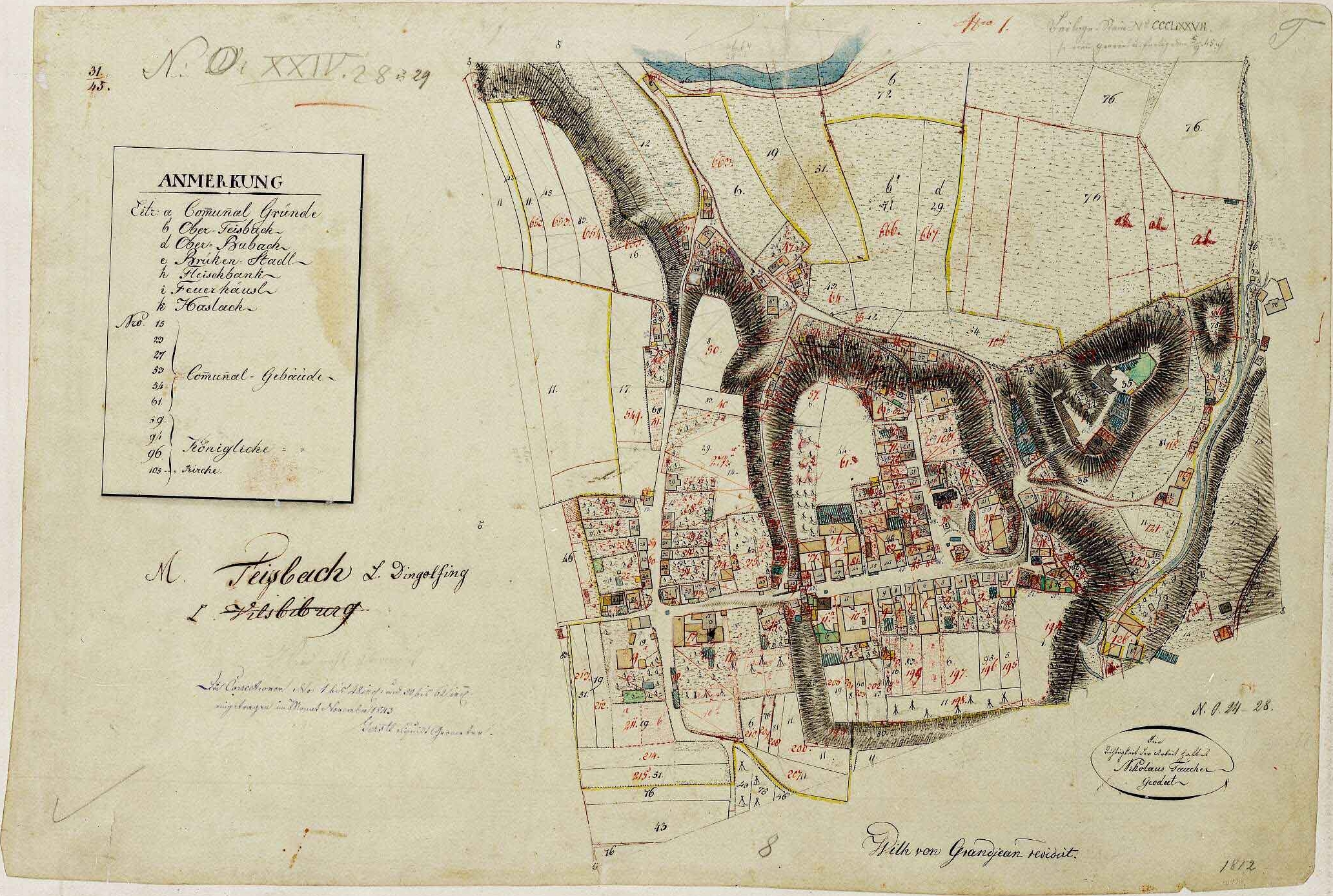
Town map from 1812
