= Mamming =

- Municipality
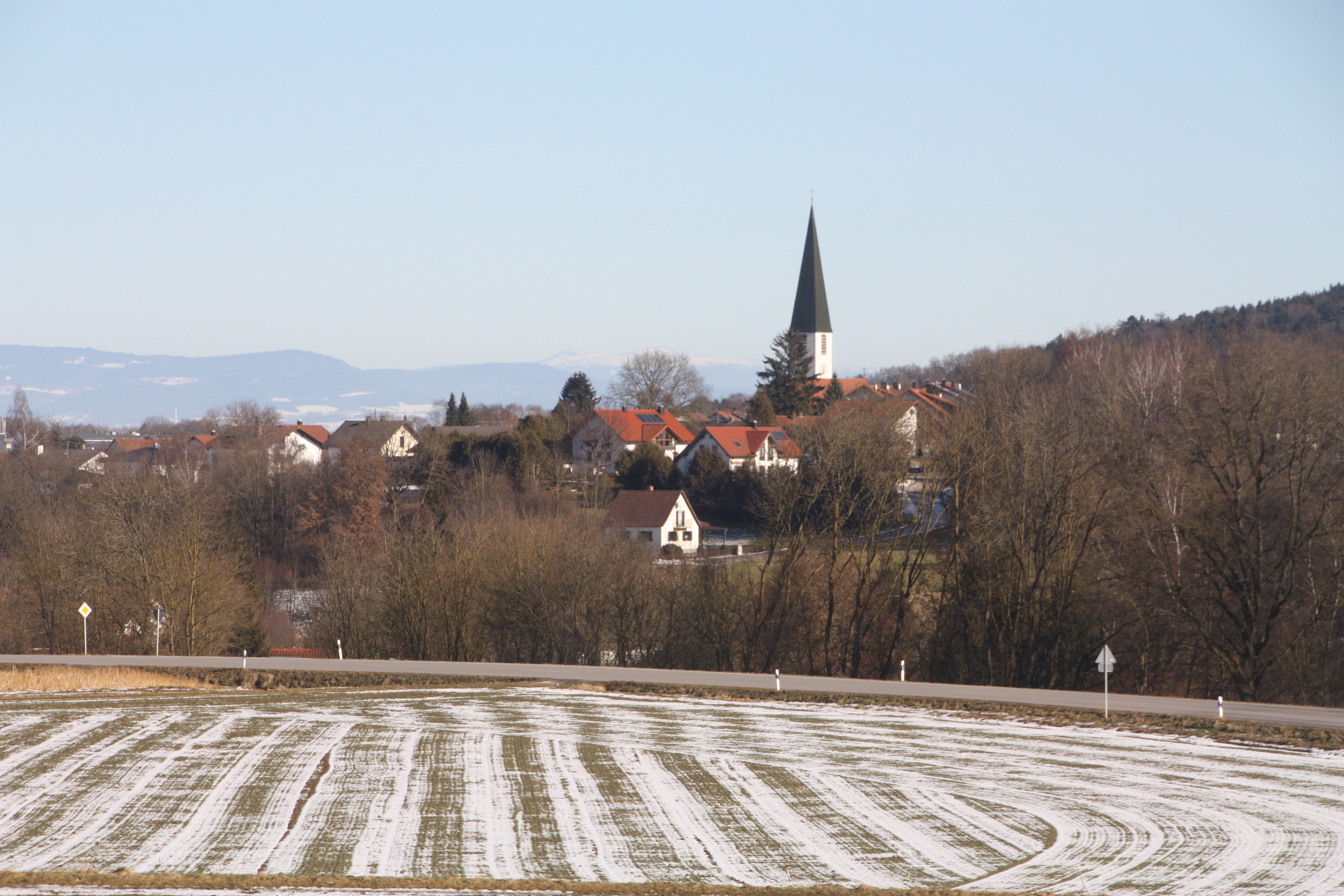
- View towards Mamming with the Church of Saint Margaret

- Coat of arms

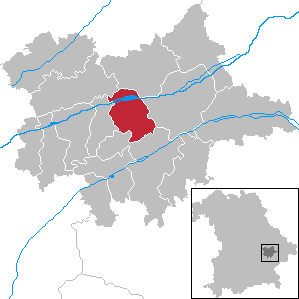
- Location of Mamming within Dingolfing-Landau district
- Interactive map of Mamming
- Location within Germany Location within Bavaria
- Coordinates: 48°39′N 12°36′E
- Country: Germany
- State: Bavaria
- Admin. region: Niederbayern
- District: Dingolfing-Landau
- Municipal assoc.: Mamming

Government
  - Mayor (2020–26): Irmgard Eberl

Area
  - Total: 41.49 km^{2} (16.02 sq mi)
- Elevation: 368 m (1,207 ft)

Population (2025-12-31)
  - Total: 3,319
  - Density: 80.00/km^{2} (207.2/sq mi)
- Time zone: UTC+01:00 (CET)
  - Summer (DST): UTC+02:00 (CEST)
- Postal codes: 94437
- Dialling codes: 09955
- Vehicle registration: DGF
- Website: www.mamming.de

Mamming is a municipality in the district of Dingolfing-Landau in Bavaria in Germany.
