= Mamming (Verwaltungsgemeinschaft) =

- Verwaltungsgemeinschaft
- Location of Mamming within Dingolfing-Landau district
- Interactive map of Mamming
- Location within Germany Location within Bavaria
- Coordinates: 48°39′N 12°36′E
- Country: Germany
- State: Bavaria
- Admin. region: Lower Bavaria
- District: Dingolfing-Landau
- Seat: Mamming
- Subdivisions: 2 municipalities

Area
  - Total: 68.54 km^{2} (26.46 sq mi)

Population (2025-12-31)
  - Total: 5,958
  - Density: 86.93/km^{2} (225.1/sq mi)
- Time zone: UTC+01:00 (CET)
  - Summer (DST): UTC+02:00 (CEST)
- Website: www.mamming.de

Mamming is a Verwaltungsgemeinschaft (municipal association) in the district Dingolfing-Landau in Bavaria, Germany. Its seat is in Mamming. It consists of the following municipalities:

1. Gottfrieding
2. Mamming
