= Wiest =

Wiest may refer to:

== People with the surname ==
- Dianne Wiest (born 1948), American actress
- Howard Wiest (1864–1945), American jurist, Chief Justice of the Michigan Supreme Court
- Stephan Wiest (1748–1797), Catholic priest and academic
- Steve Wiest (born 1957), jazz trombonist, composer, educator
- Susanne Wiest (born 1967), German social activist

== Places ==
- Wiest Bluff, location in Antarctica
