= Günter Baumgartner =

German politician (born 1975)

Günter Baumgartner MdB

Member of the Bundestag; for Rottal-Inn
- Incumbent
- Assumed office 25 March 2025
- Preceded by: Max Straubinger

Personal details
- Born: 24 April 1975 (age 51) Rotthalmünster, West Germany
- Party: Christian Social Union (since 2000)
- Children: 3

Günter Baumgartner (born 24 April 1975) is a German politician who was elected as a member of the Bundestag in 2025. He has served as mayor of Bayerbach since 2020.
