= Niederviehbach =

- Municipality
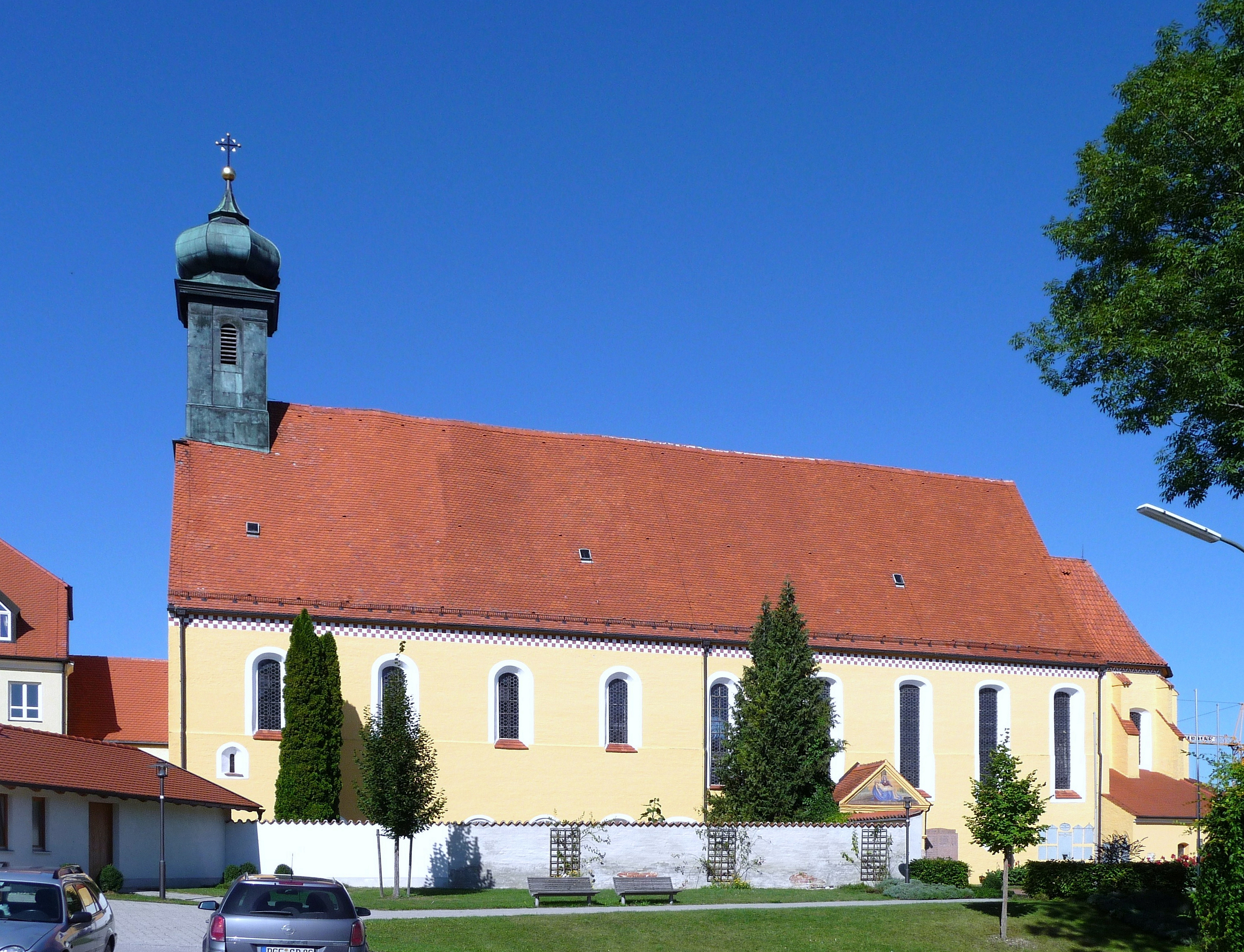
- Church of the Virgin Mary

- Coat of arms

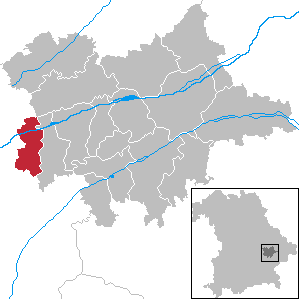
- Location of Niederviehbach within Dingolfing-Landau district
- Interactive map of Niederviehbach
- Location within Germany Location within Bavaria
- Coordinates: 48°37′N 12°23′E
- Country: Germany
- State: Bavaria
- Admin. region: Niederbayern
- District: Dingolfing-Landau

Government
  - Mayor (2019–25): Johannes Birkner (CSU)

Area
  - Total: 29.62 km^{2} (11.44 sq mi)
- Elevation: 392 m (1,286 ft)

Population (2025-12-31)
  - Total: 2,738
  - Density: 92.44/km^{2} (239.4/sq mi)
- Time zone: UTC+01:00 (CET)
  - Summer (DST): UTC+02:00 (CEST)
- Postal codes: 84183
- Dialling codes: 08702
- Vehicle registration: DGF
- Website: www.niederviehbach.de

Niederviehbach is a municipality in the district of Dingolfing-Landau in Bavaria in Germany. It lies on the Isar River.
