= Weist Apartments =

Historic building in Portland, Oregon, U.S.

- U.S. National Register of Historic Places
- U.S. Historic district – Contributing property
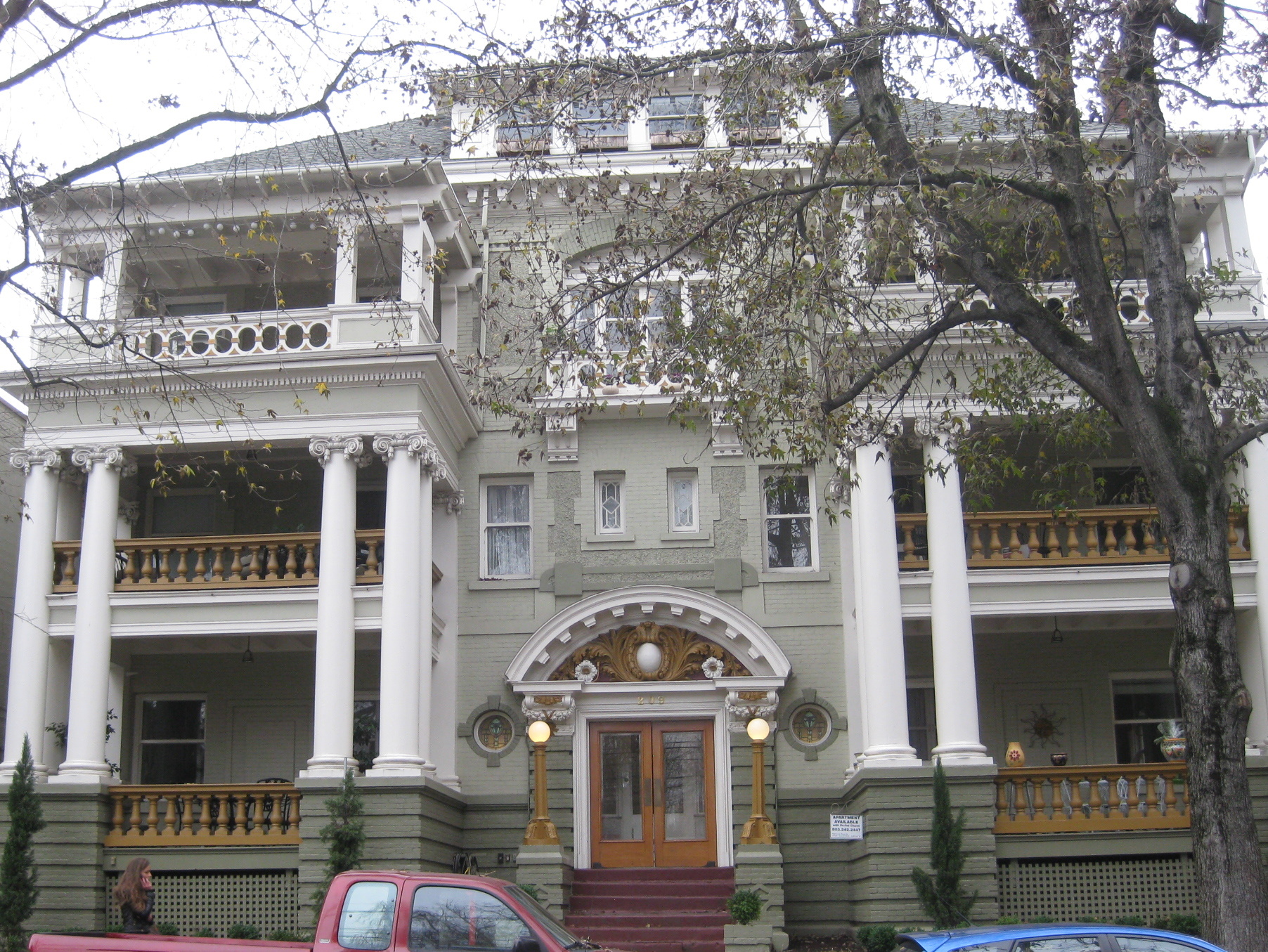
- The Weist Apartments in 2010

- Location within Portland, Oregon Location within Oregon Location within the United States
- Location: 209 NW 23rd Avenue; Portland, Oregon
- Coordinates: 45°31′28″N 122°41′56″W
- Built: 1905
- Architect: William Morgan
- Architectural style: Colonial Revival
- Part of: Alphabet Historic District (ID00001293)
- NRHP reference No.: 90000293
- Added to NRHP: February 23, 1990

The Weist Apartments, located in northwest Portland, Oregon, are listed on the National Register of Historic Places.

== See also ==
- National Register of Historic Places listings in Northwest Portland, Oregon
