= Loiching =

- Municipality
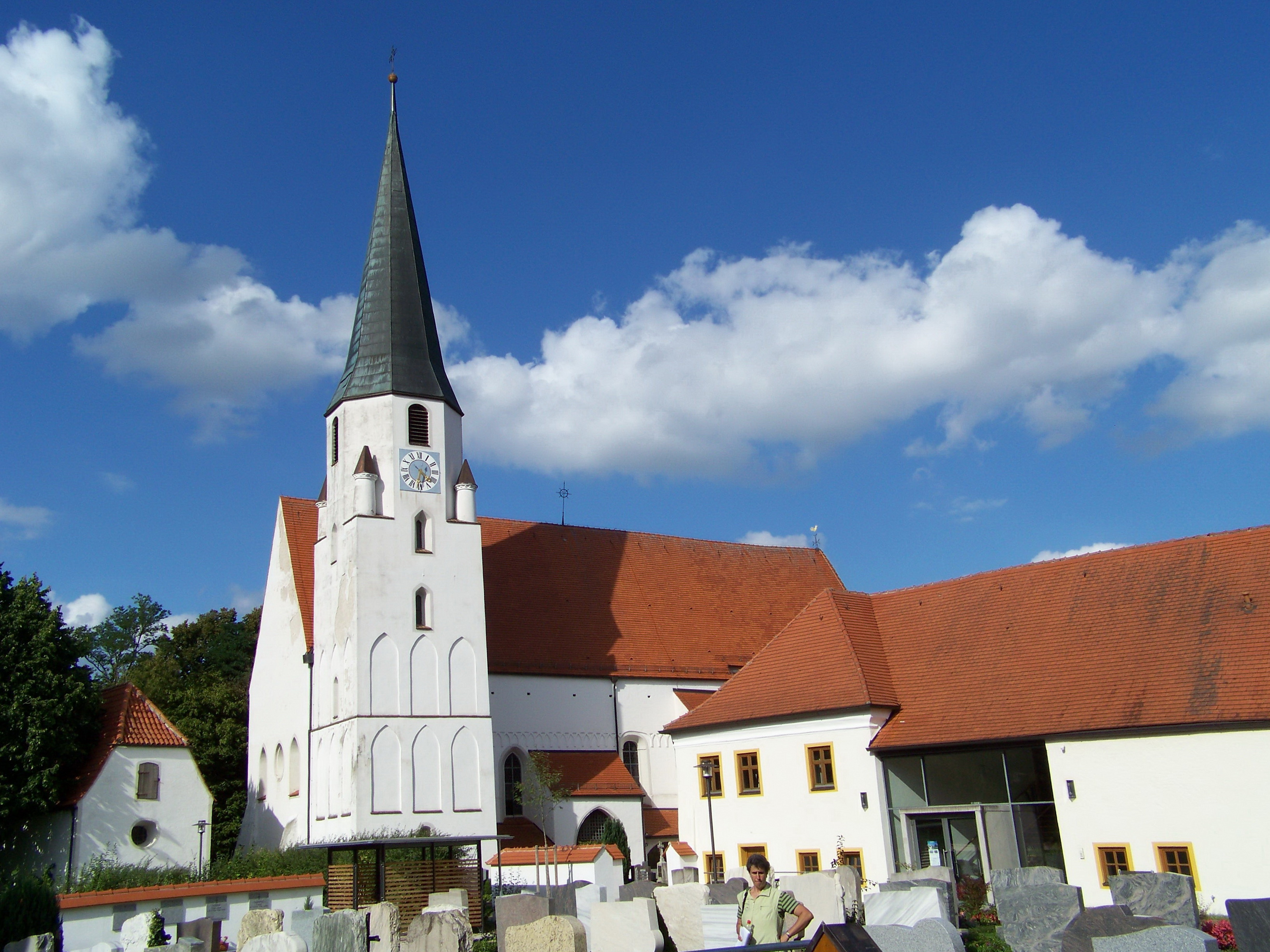
- Church of Saints Peter and Paul

- Coat of arms

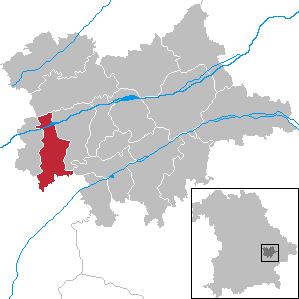
- Location of Loiching within Dingolfing-Landau district
- Interactive map of Loiching
- Location within Germany Location within Bavaria
- Coordinates: 48°37′N 12°26′E
- Country: Germany
- State: Bavaria
- Admin. region: Niederbayern
- District: Dingolfing-Landau

Government
  - Mayor (2020–26): Günter Schuster (CSU)

Area
  - Total: 38.93 km^{2} (15.03 sq mi)
- Elevation: 385 m (1,263 ft)

Population (2025-12-31)
  - Total: 3,825
  - Density: 98.25/km^{2} (254.5/sq mi)
- Time zone: UTC+01:00 (CET)
  - Summer (DST): UTC+02:00 (CEST)
- Postal codes: 84180
- Dialling codes: 08731, 08744, 08732, 08702
- Vehicle registration: DGF
- Website: www.loiching.de

Loiching is a municipality in the district of Dingolfing-Landau in Bavaria in Germany.
