= Dingolfing-Landau =

Coordinates: 48°40′N 12°35′E

- District
- Flag Coat of arms
- Country: Germany
- State: Bavaria
- Adm. region: Lower Bavaria
- Capital: Dingolfing

Government
  - District admin.: Werner Bumeder (CSU)

Area
  - Total: 878 km^{2} (339 sq mi)

Population (31 December 2025)
  - Total: 101,040
  - Density: 115/km^{2} (298/sq mi)
- Time zone: UTC+01:00 (CET)
  - Summer (DST): UTC+02:00 (CEST)
- Vehicle registration: DGF, LAN
- Website: lra-dgf.bayern.de

Dingolfing-Landau is a Landkreis (district) in Bavaria, Germany. It is bounded by (from the north and clockwise) the districts of Straubing-Bogen, Deggendorf, Rottal-Inn and Landshut.

== History ==
The district was established in 1972 by merging the former districts of Dingolfing and Landau (Isar). Its original name was Untere Isar ("Lower Isar"), but in 1973 it was renamed and got its present name.

== Geography ==
The region is characterised by very plain countryside and several rivers running from southwest to northeast (towards the Danube). Most important rivers of the district are the Isar and the Vils.

== Economy ==
The reginal economy is heavily reliant on the automotive industry, anchored by BMW Group Plant Dingolfing, which is the company's largest production facility ion the world.

== Coat of arms ==
The coat of arms displays:

- The blue and white checkered pattern of Bavaria
- The lion from the arms of the county of Leonberg (once ruling in Landau)
- The red and white bars are from the arms of the county of Frontenhausen (once ruling in Dingolfing)

== Towns and municipalities ==
Clickable map of towns and municipalities in the district

Towns
1. Dingolfing
2. Landau an der Isar
Märkte
1. Eichendorf
2. Frontenhausen
3. Pilsting
4. Reisbach
5. Simbach
6. Wallersdorf
Municipalities
1. Loiching
2. Marklkofen
3. Mengkofen
4. Moosthenning
5. Niederviehbach

Verwaltungsgemeinschaft

1. Mamming

1. Gottfrieding
2. Mamming^{1}
^{1}seat of the Verwaltungsgemeinschaft
