= Simbach, Dingolfing-Landau =

Simbach
- Municipality
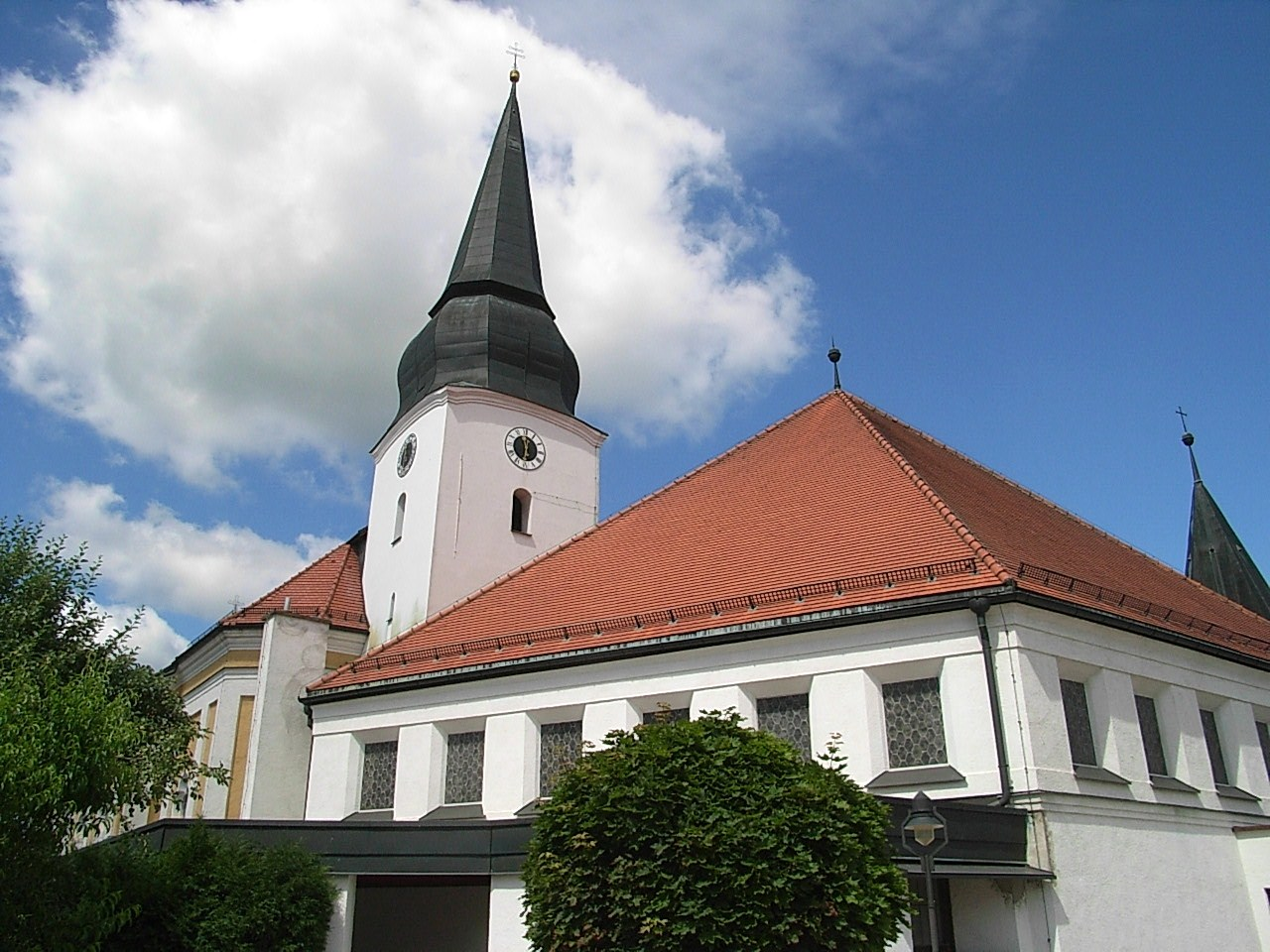
- Church of Saint Bartholomew

- Coat of arms

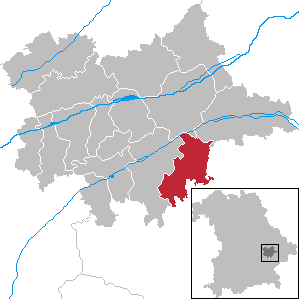
- Location of Simbach within Dingolfing-Landau district
- Interactive map of Simbach
- Location within Germany Location within Bavaria
- Coordinates: 48°34′N 12°45′E
- Country: Germany
- State: Bavaria
- Admin. region: Niederbayern
- District: Dingolfing-Landau
- Subdivisions: 5 Ortsteile

Government
  - Mayor (2020–26): Herbert Sporrer (CSU)

Area
  - Total: 51.19 km^{2} (19.76 sq mi)
- Elevation: 440 m (1,440 ft)

Population (2025-12-31)
  - Total: 4,196
  - Density: 81.97/km^{2} (212.3/sq mi)
- Time zone: UTC+01:00 (CET)
  - Summer (DST): UTC+02:00 (CEST)
- Postal codes: 94436
- Dialling codes: 09954
- Vehicle registration: DGF
- Website: www.markt-simbach.de

Simbach (German pronunciation: [ˈzɪmbax]) is a market town and municipality in the district of Dingolfing-Landau, Bavaria, Germany. As of 2020, it had a population of around 4,000 and an area of 51.23 km².

Simbach consists of the market town of Simbach, 10 villages and more than 100 hamlets and isolated dwellings. The largest villages are Haunersdorf (in the north) and Ruhstorf (in the south). The area around Simbach is still characterized by agriculture. The largest employer is the Fleischer company, which produces canned vegetables.

== Timeline ==
- 806 - The town is first mentioned in official documents
- 13th century - The town received the title Markt
- 1496 - Construction of St. Bartholomäus Church was completed
- c. 1634 - The town was struck by plague
- 1658 - Part of the town was destroyed by fire
- 1670 - A second school building, the Deiritzhaus, was built
- 1736 - The church was extended in the baroque style
- 1972 - Communal reform took place
