= Gottfrieding =

- Municipality
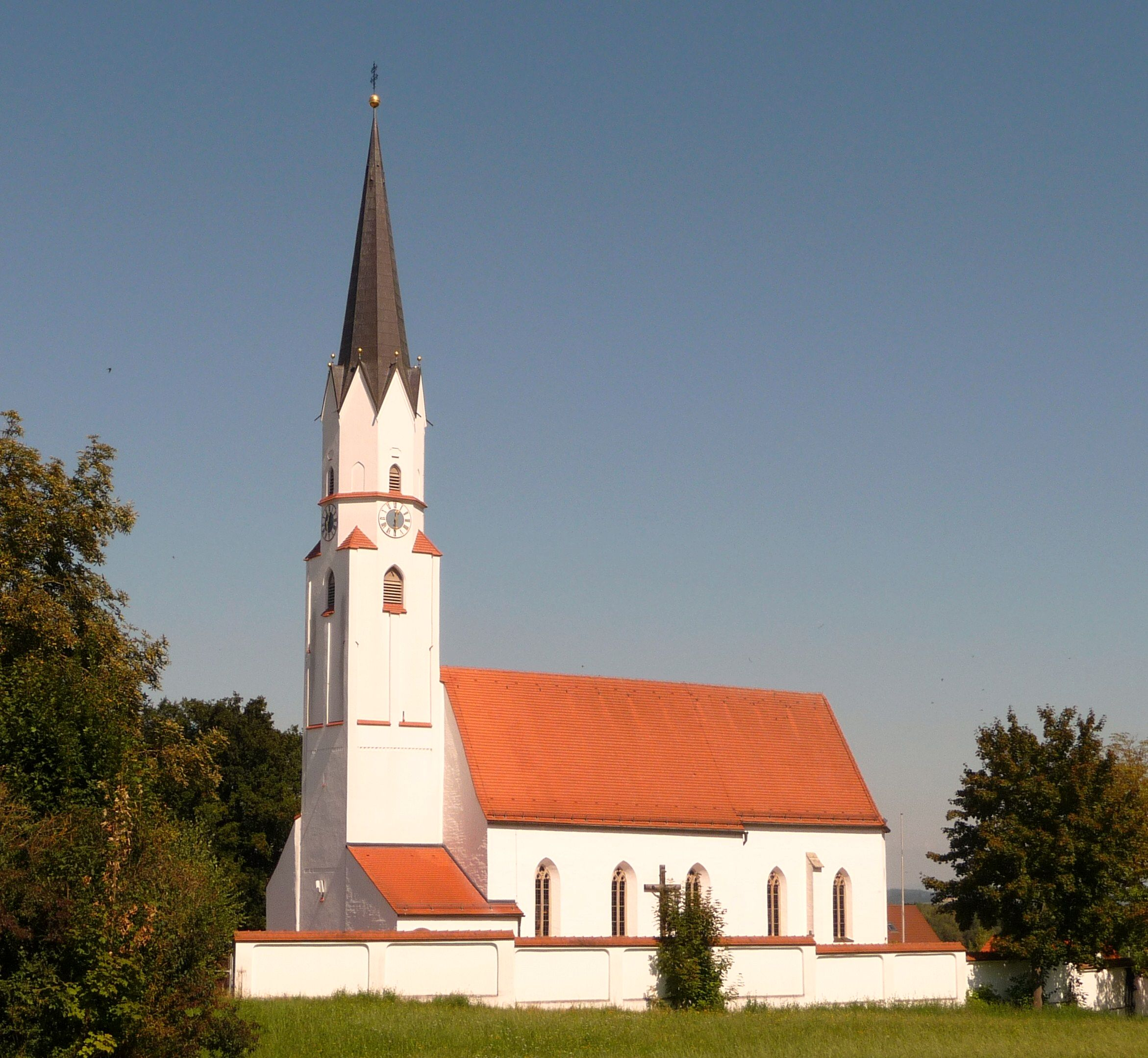
- Saint Stephen Church

- Coat of arms

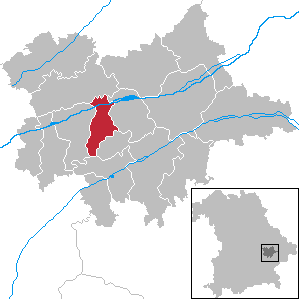
- Location of Gottfrieding within Dingolfing-Landau district
- Interactive map of Gottfrieding
- Location within Germany Location within Bavaria
- Coordinates: 48°39′N 12°32′E
- Country: Germany
- State: Bavaria
- Admin. region: Niederbayern
- District: Dingolfing-Landau
- Municipal assoc.: Mamming
- Subdivisions: 13 Ortsteile

Government
  - Mayor (2020–26): Gerald Rost (CSU)

Area
  - Total: 27.07 km^{2} (10.45 sq mi)
- Elevation: 369 m (1,211 ft)

Population (2025-12-31)
  - Total: 2,639
  - Density: 97.49/km^{2} (252.5/sq mi)
- Time zone: UTC+01:00 (CET)
  - Summer (DST): UTC+02:00 (CEST)
- Postal codes: 84177
- Dialling codes: 08731
- Vehicle registration: DGF
- Website: www.gottfrieding.de

Gottfrieding is a municipality in the district of Dingolfing-Landau in Bavaria in Germany.
