= Moosthenning =

- Municipality
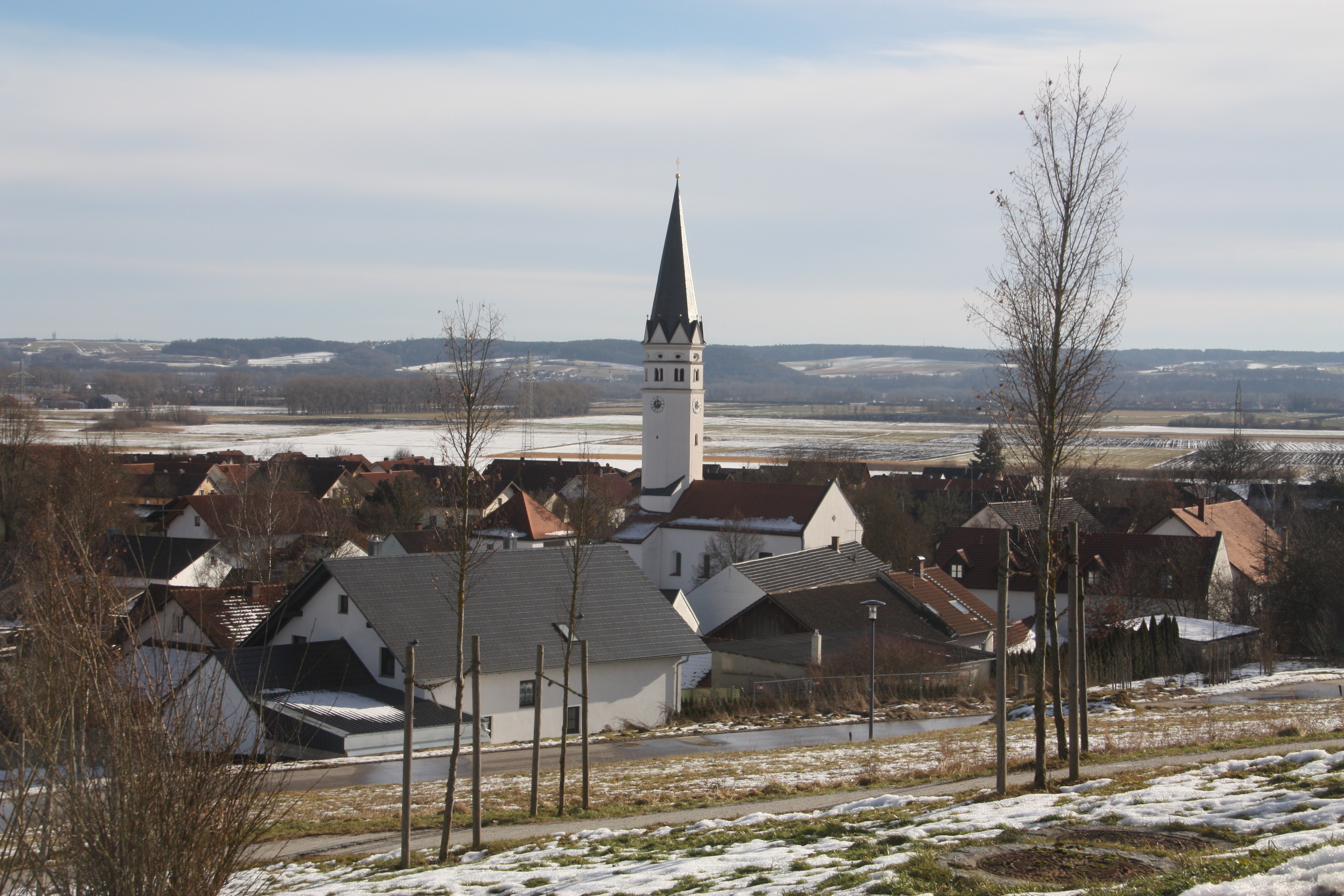
- View towards Moosthenning

- Coat of arms

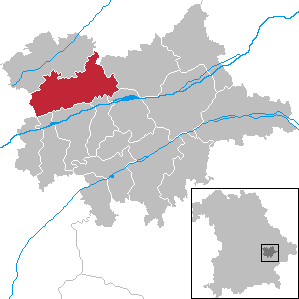
- Location of Moosthenning within Dingolfing-Landau district
- Interactive map of Moosthenning
- Location within Germany Location within Bavaria
- Coordinates: 48°41′N 12°30′E
- Country: Germany
- State: Bavaria
- Admin. region: Niederbayern
- District: Dingolfing-Landau
- Subdivisions: 6 Ortsteile

Government
  - Mayor (2020–26): Anton Kargel

Area
  - Total: 70.40 km^{2} (27.18 sq mi)
- Elevation: 368 m (1,207 ft)

Population (2025-12-31)
  - Total: 5,244
  - Density: 74.49/km^{2} (192.9/sq mi)
- Time zone: UTC+01:00 (CET)
  - Summer (DST): UTC+02:00 (CEST)
- Postal codes: 84164
- Dialling codes: 08731
- Vehicle registration: DGF
- Website: www.moosthenning.de

Moosthenning (Bavarian: Moosdenning) is a municipality in the district of Dingolfing-Landau in Bavaria in Germany.
