= Lastenausgleich =

Post-WWII social program

Lastenausgleich ('burden equalization') was the post-World War II program and law to recompense Germans, at least in part, for damages incurred during the war.

== Background ==
Between 1939 and 1948, millions of Germans lost most or all of their property due to bombings from Allied attacks or expulsion from their homes; others lost all their wealth due to currency reform. More than ten million Germans were expelled from Eastern Europe alone. Those impoverished by or from the war argued for a Lastenausgleich: that West Germany must equally divide the burden of the war by confiscating 50% or more of the surviving wealth from those "undamaged" by the war and redistribute it among the war-damaged, restoring the pre-war distribution of wealth and, by extension, moral order.

== Arguments ==
August Haußleiter, a politician with the Christian Social Union (CSU), argued that a Laustenausgleich would create a new social order and would return the social society that property ownership that failed to provide. The left-wing of the CSU argued that the war-damaged had suffered undeserved and unusual treatment that raised their concerns of a higher status than the typical welfare-seeker.

Politicians of communist East Germany were not compelled by these arguments. They argued that all Germans were human beings but that the war-damaged did not have any special claims to a Lastenausgleich or rights beyond that of any East German citizen.

The Finnish law of 1945 that made restitution to Karelians was the only case law studied in preparation for the Laustenausgleich law enactment.

=== Jewish restitution ===
At the same time as arguments for a Lastenausgleich law, the German courts and legislature were highly recalcitrant to implementing a method of restitution for Jews whose property had been seized. The law's original intention was stated as compensating only expelled German Volkszugehörige (transl. ethnic Germans). In 1939, the Reich Ministry of the Interior had explicitly banned German Jews from claiming to be Volkszugehörige and identified Jews as "people of alien blood". Some German Jews made claims under the German Restitution Laws, namely the Bundesgesetz zur Entschädigung für Opfer der nationalsozialistischen Verfolgung (BEG), which went into effect in 1953. Jews who had moved to Israel or the West were eligible to claim compensation under the BEG provided they met the so-called expellee criteria – the same cultural and linguistic features as ethnic Germans who made BEG claims. The German government had seemingly assumed that only a small number of German Jews would be eligible for BEG payments under these criteria, but underestimated the extent to which German Jews identified as Germans and that German was used as a language at home prior to the war.

The restitution of German Jews was also a provision of the Luxembourg Agreement between West Germany and Israel, signed in 1952.

== Law ==
The Lastenausgleich law (Lastenausgleichsgesetz) was passed on 14 August 1952 after three years of debate in the Bundestag ('federal parliament'). The law required all "undamaged" Germans to pay the equivalent of one-half of their property's value, as assessed on the day of the 1948 currency reforms, payable in installments, over thirty years. Payments were spread out from 1954 to 1979. By the end of 1954, the plan had paid nearly DM 3 billion, equivalent to €8 billion in 2021, mostly to new arrivals; one-tenth of the Lastenausgleich payments went to people in the state of Hesse.

Half of the funds from the Lastenausgleichsgesetz passage went to integration and social support measures, while the other half went to direct payments as compensation for war losses. It offered assistance such as absorption loans, housing help, and war-damage pensions. Compensation payments were inversely linked to the cost of the damage.

== Effects ==
The Lastenausgleich was one of the largest transfer operations in German history. The amount paid by 1978 was more than DM 110 billion, equivalent to €140.5 billion in 2021.

The law was a powerful tool in the integration of expelled Germans into West German society and contributed greatly to the West Germany economic success. In terms of compensation schemes following forced migration, West Germany was one of the few countries that paid money to refugees on a widespread scale. However the law also contributed to a great deal of envy and anti-newcomer sentiment, particularly among groups such as the Schutzverband der Westdeutschen ('protection association of the west Germans').

However the Lastenausgleich system had two major shortcomings: first, that the fund did not track with inflation; therefore contribution to the fund remained the same, despite rising property values and increased inflation such that recipients received less and less over time. Secondly, and as a result, roughly half the contributions to the Lastenausgleich fund came from taxes on the general population, including the recipients themselves. Tax revenue was utilized from the fund's inception to balance its chronic deficit because of the gradual and increasing undervaluing of property and effects of inflation.
