= Oberalteich Abbey =

Coordinates: 48°55′00″N 12°40′01″E

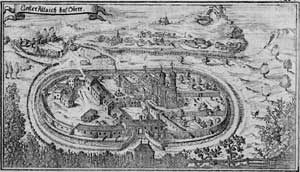
Engraving of Oberalteich Abbey from the "Churbaierische Atlas" of Anton Wilhelm Ertl 1687

Oberalteich Abbey (German: Abtei Oberalteich or Kloster Oberalteich; sometimes Oberaltaich) was a Benedictine monastery in Bogen, Bavaria, Germany.

== History ==
The monastery, dedicated to Saints Peter and Paul, was founded in c. 1100 by Count Frederick of Bogen, a Vogt of Regensburg Cathedral. After a serious fire in 1245 the premises were re-constructed under abbots Heimo (1247 to 1252) and Purchard (1256 to 1260). Under abbot Friedrich II (1346 to 1358) the abbey was fortified. The church was extensively altered in the time of abbot Johann II Asperger (1438 to 1463). The mediaeval monastery complex was modernised by abbot Veit Höser (1604 to 1634), which was followed by a total Baroque refurbishment under abbots Roman Denis (1682 to 1695), Benedikt Resch (1695 to 1704) and Ignatz Scherlin (1704 to 1721).

The abbey was dissolved in 1803 during the secularisation of Bavaria, and the monastery buildings were disposed of. Accommodation for the local priest and a servant were set up in part of them.

== Church ==
The abbey church of Saints Peter and Paul was rebuilt between 1622 and 1630 and is richly decorated. The Baroque high altar dates from 1693. The church of the former abbey became the parish church in 1803. In 1847 the tombs and monuments were removed from the church and taken to Vilshofen where they were used for the construction of a dam.
