= Stephan Protschka =

German politician

Member of the Bundestag
- Incumbent
- Assumed office 2017

Personal details
- Born: 8 November 1977 (age 48) Dingolfing, West Germany (now Germany)
- Party: AfD

Stephan Protschka (born 8 November 1977) is a German politician. Born in Dingolfing, Bavaria, he is a member of the far-right Alternative for Germany (AfD) party. Stephan Protschka has served as a member of the Bundestag from the state of Bavaria since 2017.

== Life ==
He became member of the bundestag after the 2017 German federal election. He is a member of the Committee for Food and Agriculture. In 2019 he was involved in controversy after funding and supporting a memorial in Poland honoring German soldiers in WWII and the Nazi paramilitary organization Volksdeutscher Selbstschutz. The construction of the memorial was partially initiated by the neo-Nazi organization Junge Nationalisten which is being monitored by the German intelligence services. Polish courts started an investigation against Protschka for supporting Nazism and defamation of victims of the Holocaust.

In 2024, Protschka agreed to pay a 12,000 euro fine in exchange for prosecutors dropping charges related to his calling Bavarian state premier Markus Söder "a traitor to the country" and "Södolf" at a political event in 2023.
