= Albert Füracker =

German politician

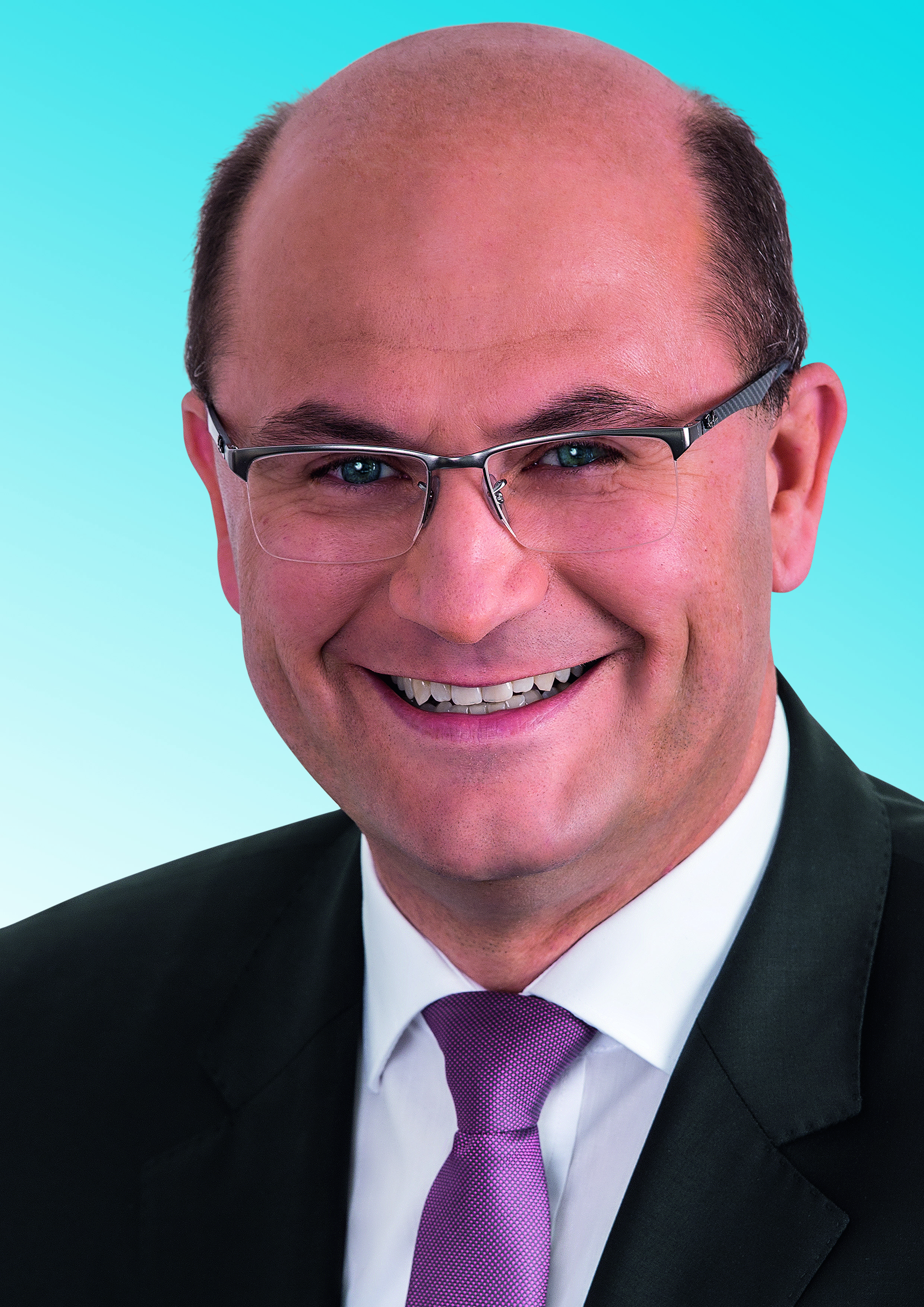
- Füracker in 2018

Minister for Finance, Regional Development and Home Affairs of Bavaria; Minister for Finance and Home Affairs of Bavaria
- Incumbent
- Assumed office 21 March 2018
- Minister President: Markus Söder
- Preceded by: Markus Söder

Member of the Landtag of Bavaria for Neumarkt
- Incumbent
- Assumed office 28 September 2008
- Preceded by: Hans Spitzner
- Majority: 49.5%

Personal details
- Born: 3 February 1968 (age 57) Parsberg, West Germany (now Germany)
- Political party: Christian Social Union

Albert Füracker (born 3 February 1968) is a German politician of the Christian Social Union of Bavaria (CSU). He has been a member of the Landtag of Bavaria since September 2008 and has served as the Minister for Finance and Home Affairs of Bavaria since March 2018.

== Education and family ==
Füracker, who came from the Lupburg district of Degerndorf, attended the grammar school in Parsberg until he graduated from secondary school. He then completed vocational training as a farmer. This was followed by further training as a state-certified technician for agriculture at the Triesdorf Technical School. In 1990, he took over his parents' farm. Until his entry into the Bavarian state parliament in 2008, Albert Füracker was a full-time farmer.

Füracker is of Roman Catholic denomination, married and has four children.

== Political career ==
Between 1986 and 2003, Füracker was a member of the Young Union. He has been a member of the CSU since 1987.

From 2009 until 2013, Füracker chaired the Committee on Food, Agriculture and Forestry. He also served on the Parliamentary Commission on the Energy Transition from 2012 until 2013.

From 2013 until 2018, Füracker was a member of the state government of Minister-President Horst Seehofer of Bavaria. During that time, he served as State Secretary at the State Ministry of Finance under the leadership of Minister Markus Söder.

Since 2018 Füracker has been serving as State Minister of Finance, Regional Development and Home Affairs in the state government of Minister-President Markus Söder of Bavaria.

Füracker was nominated by his party as delegate to the Federal Convention for the purpose of electing the President of Germany in 2022.

In the negotiations to form a Grand Coalition under the leadership of Friedrich Merz's Christian Democrats (CDU together with the Bavarian CSU) and the Social Democratic Party (SPD) following the 2025 German elections, Füracker was part of the CDU/CSU delegation in the working group on public finances, led by Mathias Middelberg, Florian Oßner and Dennis Rohde.

== Other activities ==
=== Regulatory agencies ===
- Stability Council, Ex-Officio Member (since 2018)

=== Corporate boards ===
- KfW, Member of the Board of Supervisory Directors
- Messe München, Ex-Officio Member of the Supervisory Board
- Messe Nuremberg, Ex-Officio Member of the Supervisory Board

=== Non-profit organizations ===
- Bavarian Research Foundation, Ex-Officio Member of the Board of Trustees
- Deutsches Museum, Member of the Board of Trustees
- Ifo Institute for Economic Research, Member of the Board of Trustees
- Stiftung Bayerische Gedenkstätten, Ex-Officio Member of the Board of Trustees
- Lions Club, Member

== See also ==
- List of Bavarian Christian Social Union politicians
