= Primary school =

School for children

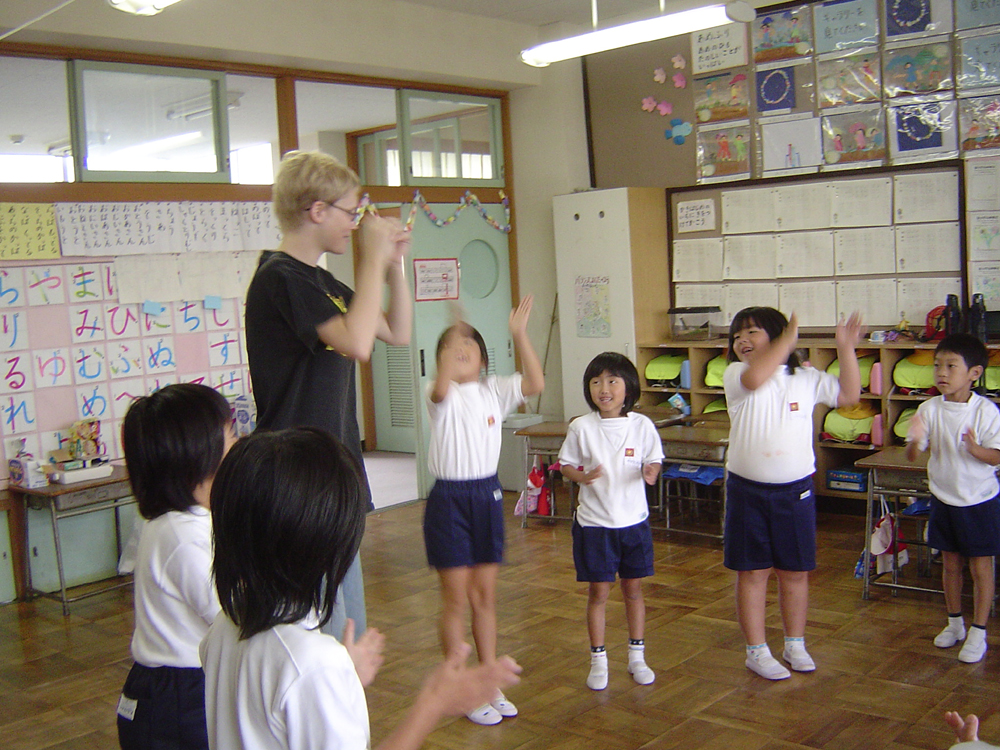
An elementary school class in Japan

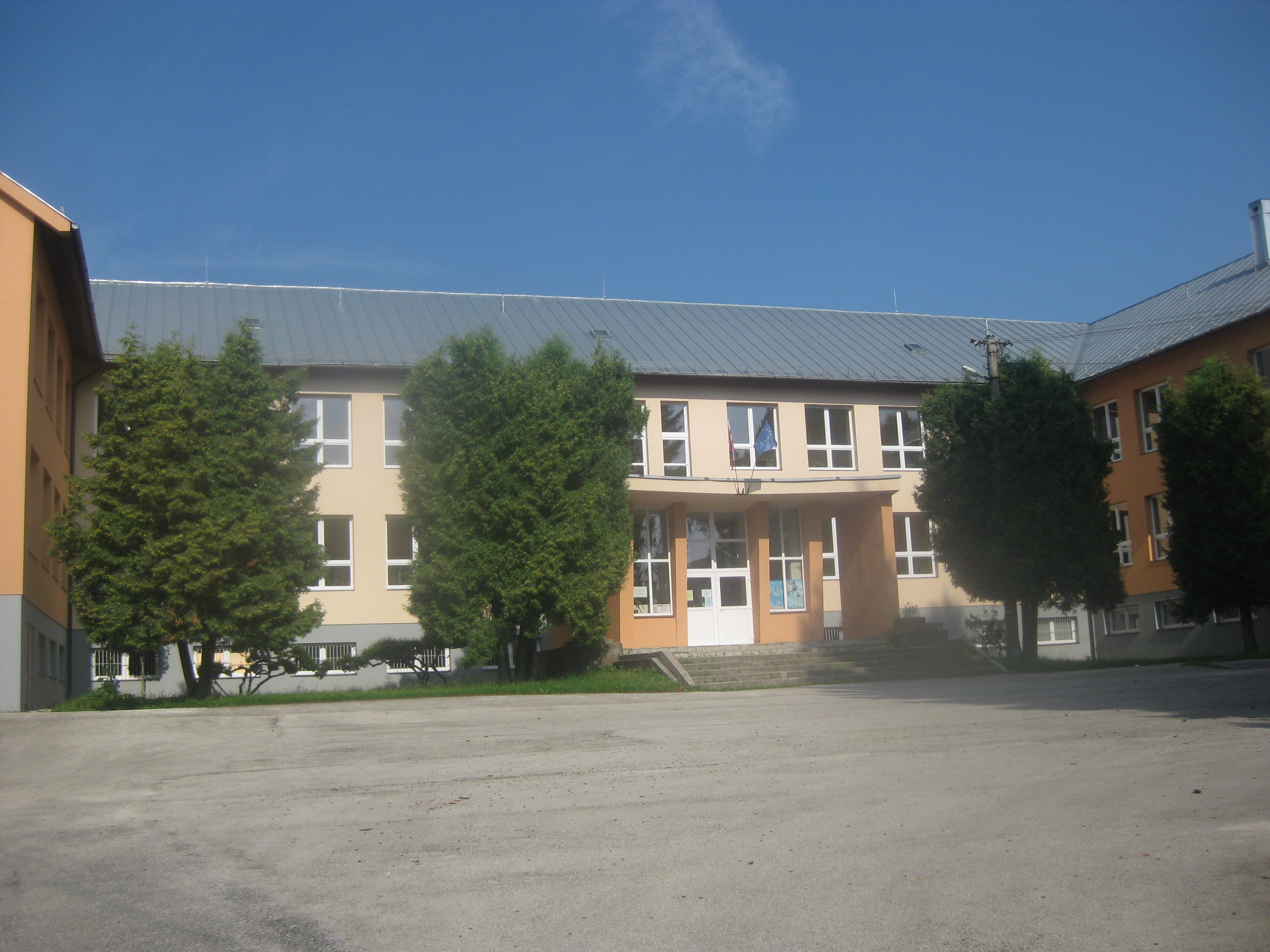
Elementary school in Višňové (Slovakia)

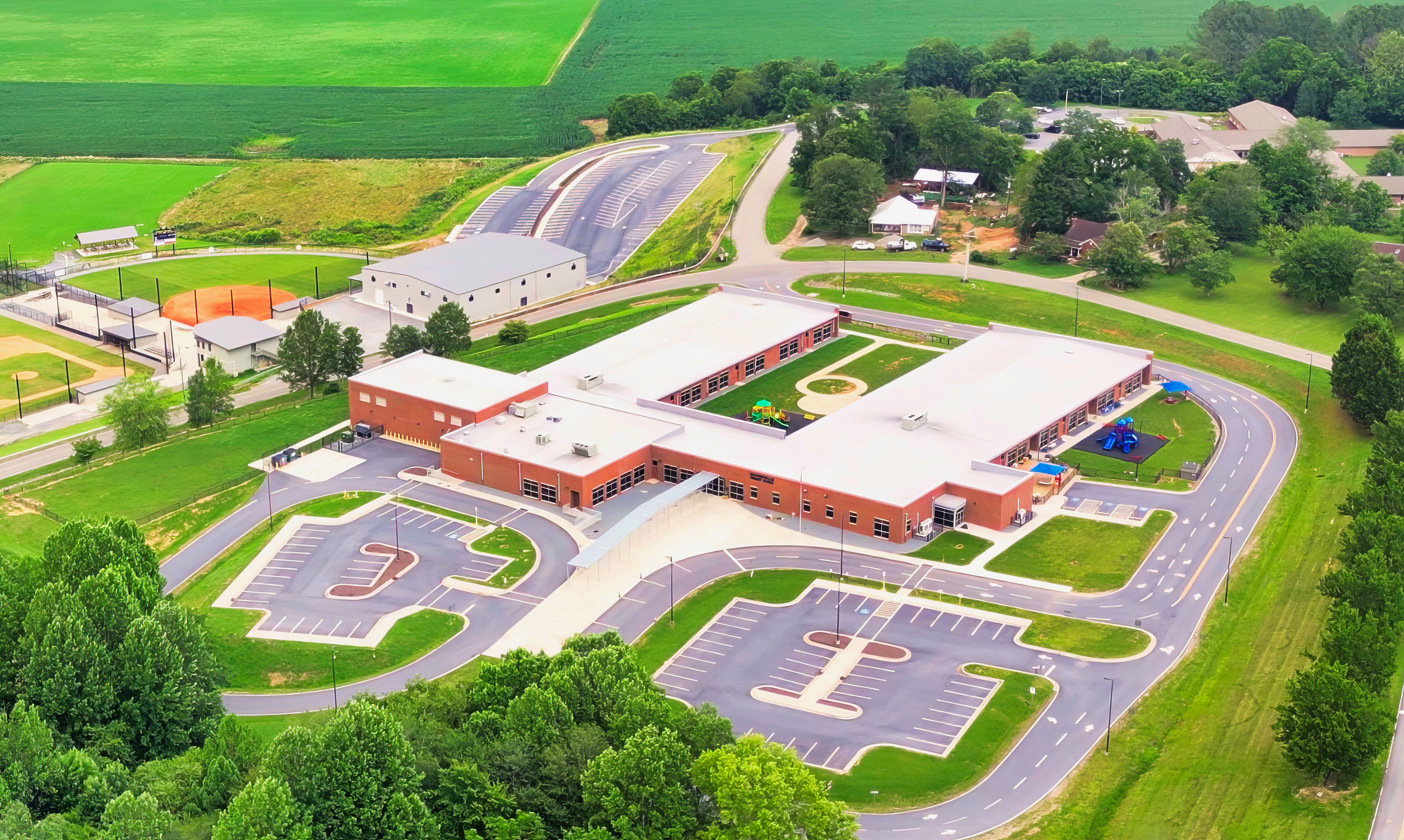
An aerial photo of a primary school in Hayesville, North Carolina

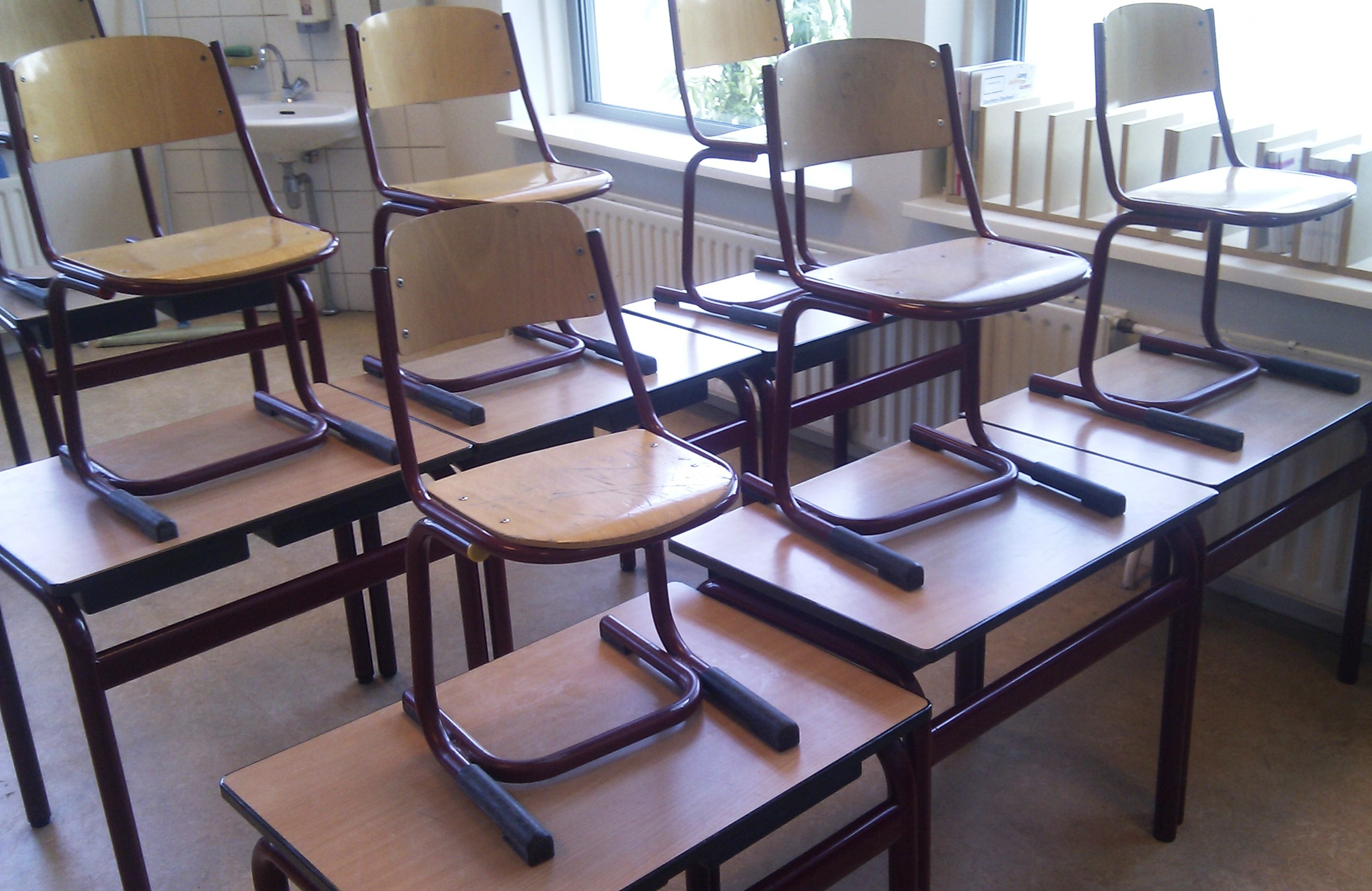
Classroom with chairs on desks in the Netherlands

A primary school (in Ireland, India, the United Kingdom, Australia, New Zealand, Trinidad and Tobago, Jamaica, South Africa, Singapore, Kenya, and Hong Kong), elementary school (in North America and the Philippines), or grade school (in North America), is a school for primary education of children who are usually 3 to 11 years of age (preschool to fifth grade). Primary schooling follows preschool and precedes secondary schooling.

The International Standard Classification of Education considers primary education as a single phase where programmes are typically designed to provide fundamental skills in reading, writing, and mathematics and to establish a solid foundation for learning. This is ISCED Level 1: Primary education or first stage of basic education.

== Terms ==
The phrase "primary school" is a calque from French école primaire, which was first used in a text of London Times in April 1802.

=== Primary schools ===
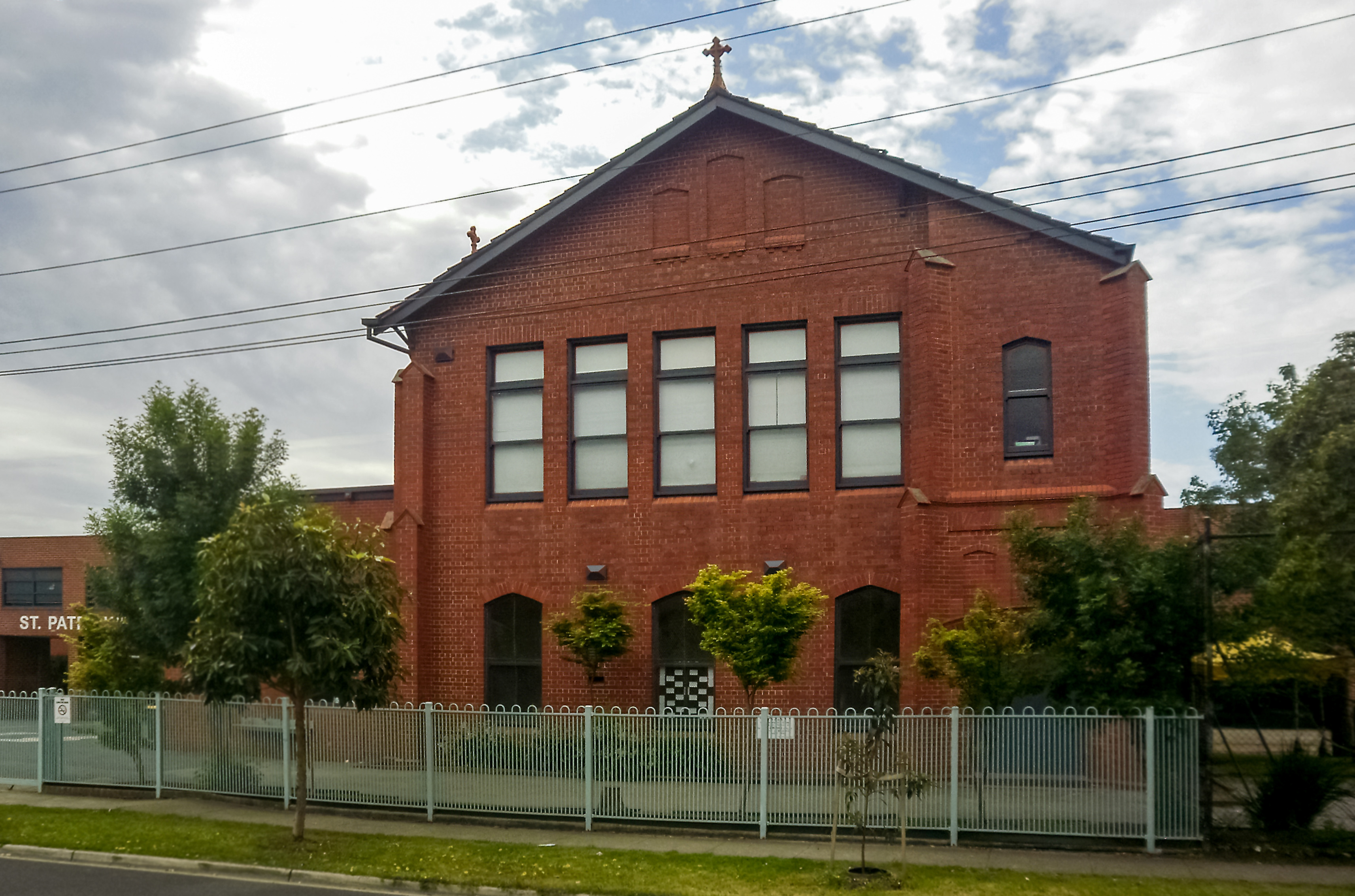
St Patrick's School at Murrumbeena, Victoria, Australia: one of many religious primary schools in the world.

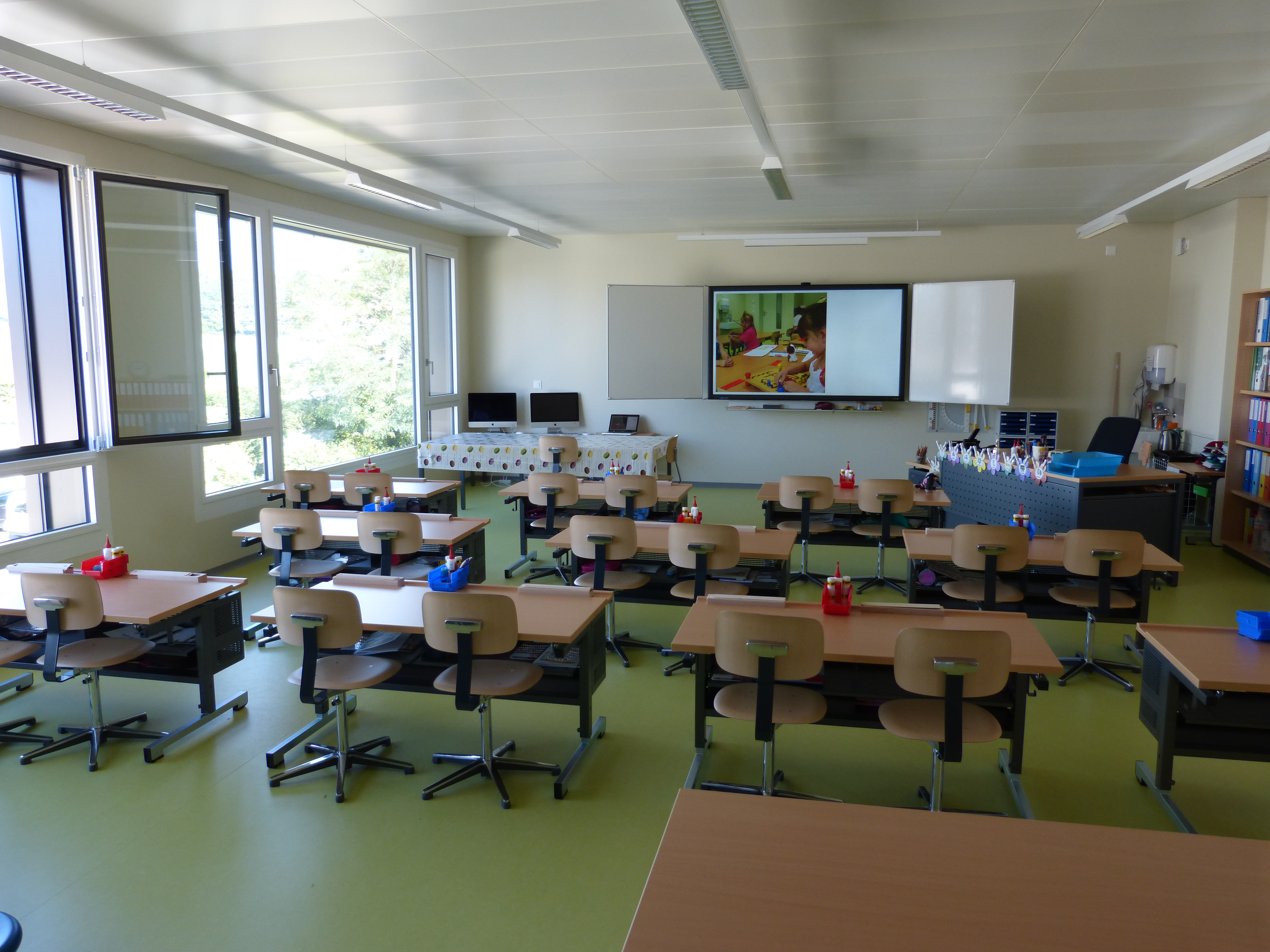
A 2015 classroom for 6–7-year olds in Switzerland

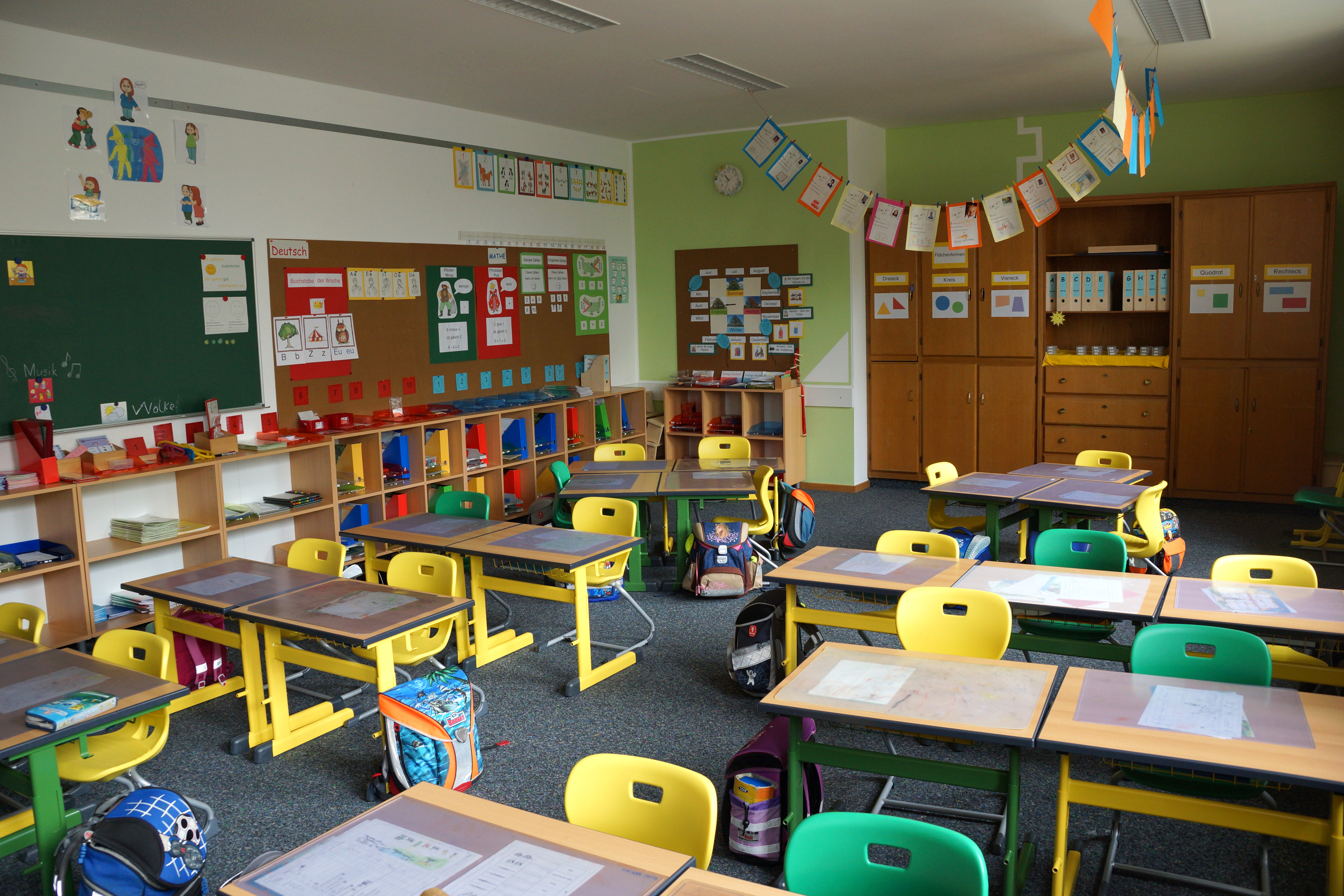
A classroom of a private Catholic elementary school in Neumarkt in der Oberpfalz

In most parts of the world, primary education is the first stage of compulsory education, and is normally available without charge, but may also be offered by fee-paying independent schools. The term grade school is sometimes used in the US, although both this term and elementary school may refer to the first eight grades, in other words both primary education and lower secondary education.

In the United Kingdom, "elementary education" was taught in "elementary schools" until 1944, when free elementary education was proposed for students over 11: there were to be primary elementary schools and secondary elementary schools; (Note: Secondary elementary school: A term already used by London County Council from 1921 to describe some 11–14 schools, and term still in use in Florida, Ohio and Brazil.) these became known as primary schools and secondary schools.

- Primary school is the preferred term in the United Kingdom, Ireland and many Commonwealth nations, and in most publications of the United Nations Educational, Scientific, and Cultural Organization (UNESCO).
- Elementary school is the synonym but mainly used in the United States.

=== Elementary schools ===
Although often used as a synonym, "elementary school" has specific meanings in different locations.

- Elementary schools, also known as board schools, were first established in England and Wales by Elementary Education Act 1870 (33 & 34 Vict. c. 75). Most of these schools became primary schools in the late 1940s, following the historic compromise in the Education Act 1944.
- Elementary schools in the United States were first promoted in 1647 in the Massachusetts Bay Colony. Today, there are currently approximately 92,858 elementary schools (68,173 public, 24,685 private). In the United States, elementary schools usually have six grades with pupils aged between 5 and 11 years old. The Elementary and Secondary Education Act of 1965 was designed to fund primary and secondary education. It also emphasized equal access to education and established high standards and accountability.
- Elementary schools in Japan were first established by 1875. In Japan, the age of pupils in elementary school ranges from 6 to 12, after which the pupils enter junior high school.

=== In other languages ===
==== Chinese ====
In Chinese-speaking world, the Chinese word xiǎo xué (simplified Chinese: 小学; traditional Chinese: 小學) is used. 國小 is a more common term in Taiwan.

In older texts it can mean linguistics including phonology, grammatology and semantics.

==== German ====
Grundschule (lit. 'ground/basic school') is the word in Germany. Primarschule is used in Liechtenstein and Switzerland. Volksschule is used in Austria and Switzerland.

== Levels of education ==
ISCED 2011 levels of education
| Level | Label | Description |
|---|---|---|
| 0 | Early childhood education (01 Early childhood educational development) | Education designed to support early development in preparation for participation in school and society. Programmes designed for children below the age of 3. |
| 0 | Early childhood education (02 Pre-primary education) | Education designed to support early development in preparation for participation in school and society. Programmes designed for children from age 3 to the start of primary education. |
| 1 | Primary education | Provides foundational skills in reading, writing, and mathematics and to establish a solid foundation for learning. |
| 2 | Lower secondary education | The first stage of secondary education with a subject-oriented curriculum. |
| 3 | Upper secondary education | The final stage of secondary education preparing students for higher education or employment. Usually with an increased range of subject options and streams. |
| 4 | Post-secondary non-tertiary education | Programmes providing learning experiences that build on secondary education and prepare for labour market entry or tertiary education. The content is broader than secondary but not as complex as tertiary education. |
| 5 | Short-cycle tertiary education | Short first tertiary programmes that are typically practically-based, occupationally-specific and prepare for labour market entry. These programmes may also provide a pathway to other tertiary programmes. |
| 6 | Bachelor's or equivalent | Provides undergraduate-level academic or professional education. |
| 7 | Master's or equivalent | Programmes designed to provide advanced academic or professional knowledge, skills and competencies leading to a second tertiary degree or equivalent qualification. |
| 8 | Doctorate or equivalent | Focuses on advanced research leading to a doctoral degree. |

== Comparison of cohorts ==
Within the English speaking world, there are three widely used systems to describe the age of the children in the cohort:

1. "Equivalent ages"
2. Countries that base their education systems on the "English model" use one of two methods to identify the year group.
3. Countries that base their systems on the "American K–12 model" refer to their year groups as "grades".

Canada also follows the American model, although its names for year groups are given as a number after the grade: for instance, "Grade 1" in Canada, rather than "First Grade" in the United States. This terminology extends into the research literature.

In Canada, education is a provincial, not a federal responsibility. For example, the province of Ontario also had a "Grade 13", designed to help students enter the workforce or post-secondary education, but this was phased out in the year 2003.

| Equivalent ages | 4–5 | 5–6 | 6–7 | 7–8 | 8–9 | 9–10 | 10–11 |
|---|---|---|---|---|---|---|---|
| U.S. (grades) | Pre-K | K | 1 | 2 | 3 | 4 | 5 |
| Ireland | Junior Infants | Senior Infants | 1st Class | 2nd Class | 3rd Class | 4th Class | 5th Class |
| England (forms) | Reception | Infants | Top infants | Junior 1 | Junior 2 | Junior 3 | Junior 4 |
| England (year) | R | 1 | 2 | 3 | 4 | 5 | 6 |
| England (key stage) | EYFS/FS | KS1 | KS1 | KS2 | KS2 | KS2 | KS2 |
| Scotland | P1 | P2 | P3 | P4 | P5 | P6 | P7 |
| Jamaica | Pre-K | K-1 | Grade 1 | Grade 2 | Grade 3 | Grade 4 | Grade 5 |
| ISCED level | 0 | 1 | 1 | 1 | 1 | 1 | 1 |
| Indonesia | TK A | TK B | SD Kelas 1 | SD Kelas 2 | SD Kelas 3 | SD Kelas 4 | SD Kelas 5 |

| Equivalent ages | 11–12 | 12–13 | 13–14 | 14–15 | 15–16 | 16–17 | 17–18 |
|---|---|---|---|---|---|---|---|
| U.S. (grades) | 6 | 7 | 8 | 9 | 10 | 11 | 12 |
| Ireland | 6th Class | 1st Year | 2nd Year | 3rd Year | 4th Year/Transition Year (TY) | 5th Year | 6th Year |
| England (forms) | First | Second | Third | Fourth | Fifth | Lower Sixth | Upper Sixth |
| England (year) | 7 | 8 | 9 | 10 | 11 | 12 | 13 |
| England (key stage) | KS3 | KS3 | KS3 | KS4 | KS4 | KS5 | KS5 |
| Scotland | S1 | S2 | S3 | S4 | S5 | S6 | |
| Jamaica (forms) | First | Second | Third | Fourth | Fifth | Lower Sixth | Upper Sixth |
| Jamaica (grades) | 7 | 8 | 9 | 10 | 11 | 12 | 13 |
| ISCED level | 2 | 2 | 2 | 3 | 3 | 3 | 3 |
| Indonesia | SD Kelas 6 | SMP Kelas 7 | SMP Kelas 8 | SMP Kelas 9 | SMA Kelas 10 | SMA Kelas 11 | SMA Kelas 12 |

== Theoretical framework of primary school design ==
School building design does not happen in isolation. The building (or school campus) needs to accommodate:

- Curriculum content
- Teaching methods
- Costs
- Education within the political framework
- Use of school building (also in the community setting)
- Constraints imposed by the site
- Design philosophy

Each country will have a different education system and priorities. Schools need to accommodate students, staff, storage, mechanical and electrical systems, support staff, ancillary staff and administration. The number of rooms required can be determined from the predicted roll of the school and the area needed.

According to standards used in the United Kingdom, a general classroom for 30 reception class or infant (Key Stage 1) students needs to be 62 m^{2}, or 55 m^{2} for juniors (Key Stage 2). Examples are given on how this can be configured for a 210 place primary with attached 26-place nursery and two-storey 420 place (two form entry) primary school with attached 26 place nursery.

== Building design specifications ==
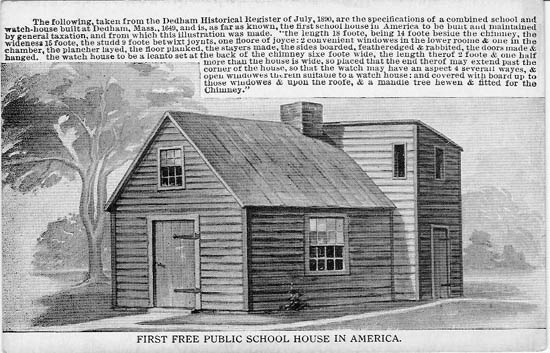
The first taxpayer-funded public school in the United States was in Dedham, Mass.

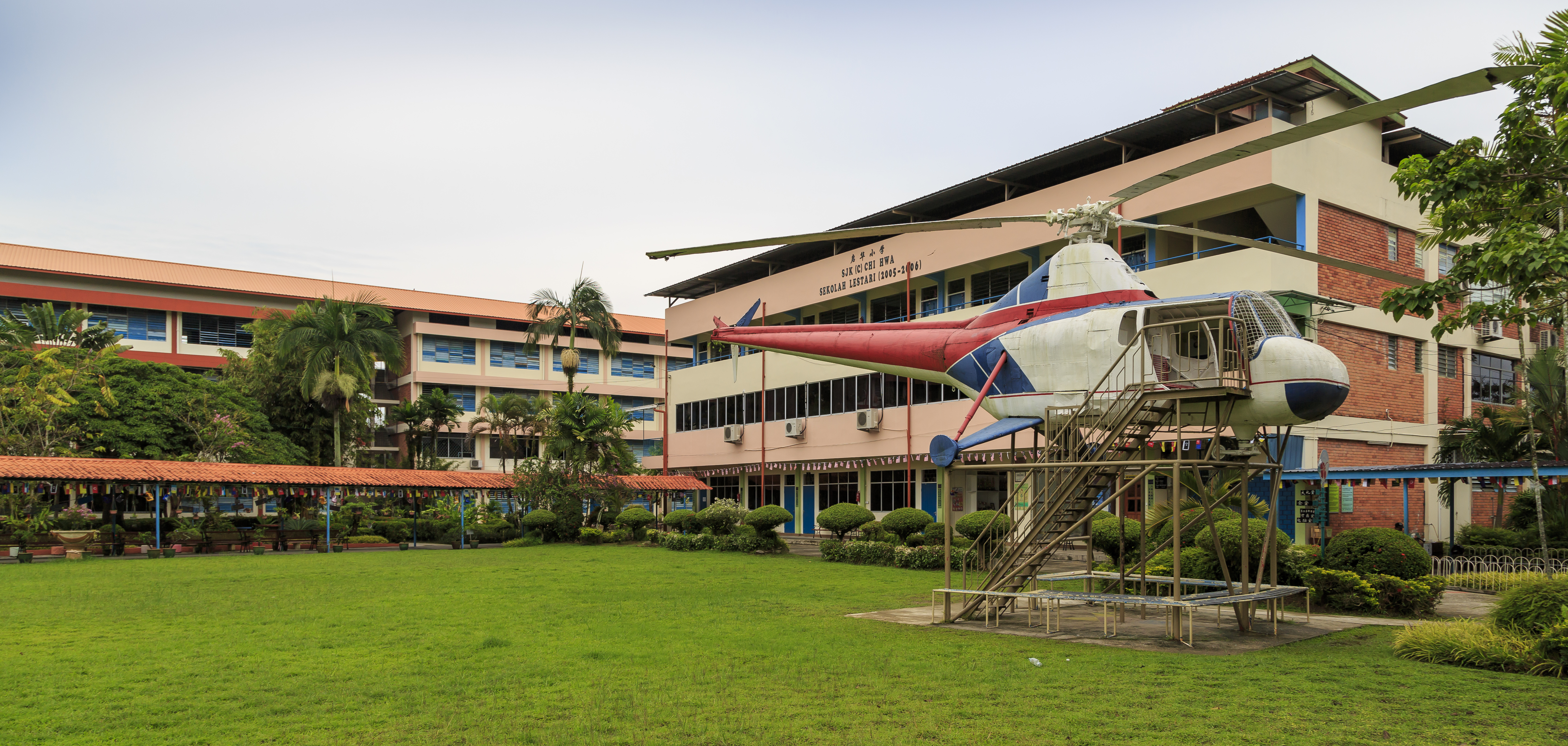
SJK (C) Chi Hwa Eco-Nature Primary School in Sandakan, Malaysia

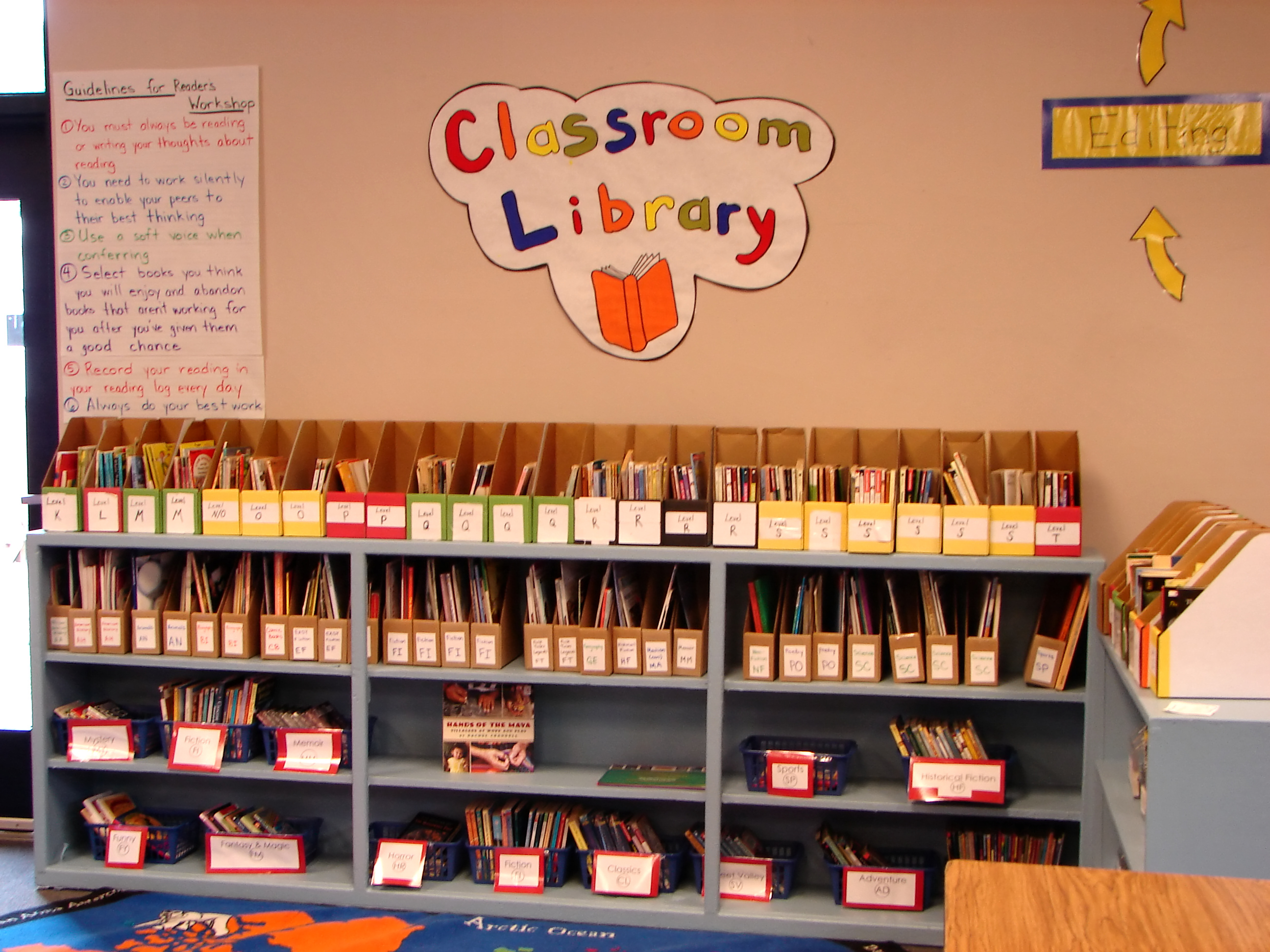
A classroom library in the US

The building providing the education has to fulfil the needs of the students, the teachers, the non-teaching support staff, the administrators and the community. It has to meet general government building guidelines, health requirements, minimal functional requirements for classrooms, toilets and showers, electricity and services, preparation and storage of textbooks and basic teaching aids. An optimum school will meet the minimum conditions and will have:

- Adequately sized classrooms—where 60 m^{2} is considered optimum but 80 m^{2} for the reception class
- Specialised teaching spaces
- A staff preparation room
- Staff welfare facilities
- An administration block
- Multipurpose classrooms
- Student toilet facilities
- A general-purpose school hall
- Adequate equipment
- Storage
- A library or library stocks that are regularly renewed
- Computer rooms or media centres
- Counselling, sick and medical examination rooms

Government accountants having read the advice then publish minimum guidelines on schools. These enable environmental modelling and establishing building costs. Future design plans are audited to ensure that these standards are met but not exceeded. Government ministries continue to press for the 'minimum' space and cost standards to be reduced.

The UK government published this downwardly revised space formula for primary schools in 2014. It said the floor area should be 350 m^{2} + 4.1 m^{2}/pupil place. The external finishes were to be downgraded to meet a build cost of £1113/m^{2}.

== Governance and funding ==
There are several main ways of funding a school: by the state through general taxation, by a religious institution such as a mosque or church, by a charity, by contributions from parents, or by a combination of these methods. Day-to-day oversight of the school can be done through a board of governors, the funding institution, or the owner.

The United Kingdom allows elementary education to be delivered in church schools, whereas in France this is illegal as there is strict separation of church and state.

== Accountability ==
This can be through informal assessment by the staff and governors such as in Finland, or by a state run testing regime such as Ofsted in the United Kingdom.

== See also ==
- Dame schools
- Early childhood education
- Educational stage
- Virtual reality in primary education
- Vocal school (Blab school)
