= Neumarkter Passionsspiele =

Neumarkter Passionsspiele is a theatre festival in Neumarkt in der Oberpfalz, Bavaria, Germany.
