= Neumarkt in der Oberpfalz (Verwaltungsgemeinschaft) =

- Verwaltungsgemeinschaft
- Location of Neumarkt in der Oberpfalz within Neumarkt district
- Interactive map of Neumarkt in der Oberpfalz
- Location within Germany Location within Bavaria
- Coordinates: 49°17′N 11°28′E
- Country: Germany
- State: Bavaria
- Admin. region: Upper Palatinate
- District: Neumarkt
- Seat: Neumarkt in der Oberpfalz
- Subdivisions: 3 municipalities

Area
  - Total: 103.28 km^{2} (39.88 sq mi)

Population (2025-12-31)
  - Total: 9,642
  - Density: 93.36/km^{2} (241.8/sq mi)
- Time zone: UTC+01:00 (CET)
  - Summer (DST): UTC+02:00 (CEST)
- Website: www.vg-neumarkt.de

Neumarkt in der Oberpfalz is a Verwaltungsgemeinschaft (municipal association) in the district of Neumarkt in Bavaria, Germany. Its seat is in Neumarkt in der Oberpfalz, itself not part of the Verwaltungsgemeinschaft.

It consists of the following municipalities:

1. Berngau
2. Pilsach
3. Sengenthal
