= Albert Dess =

German politician (born 1947)

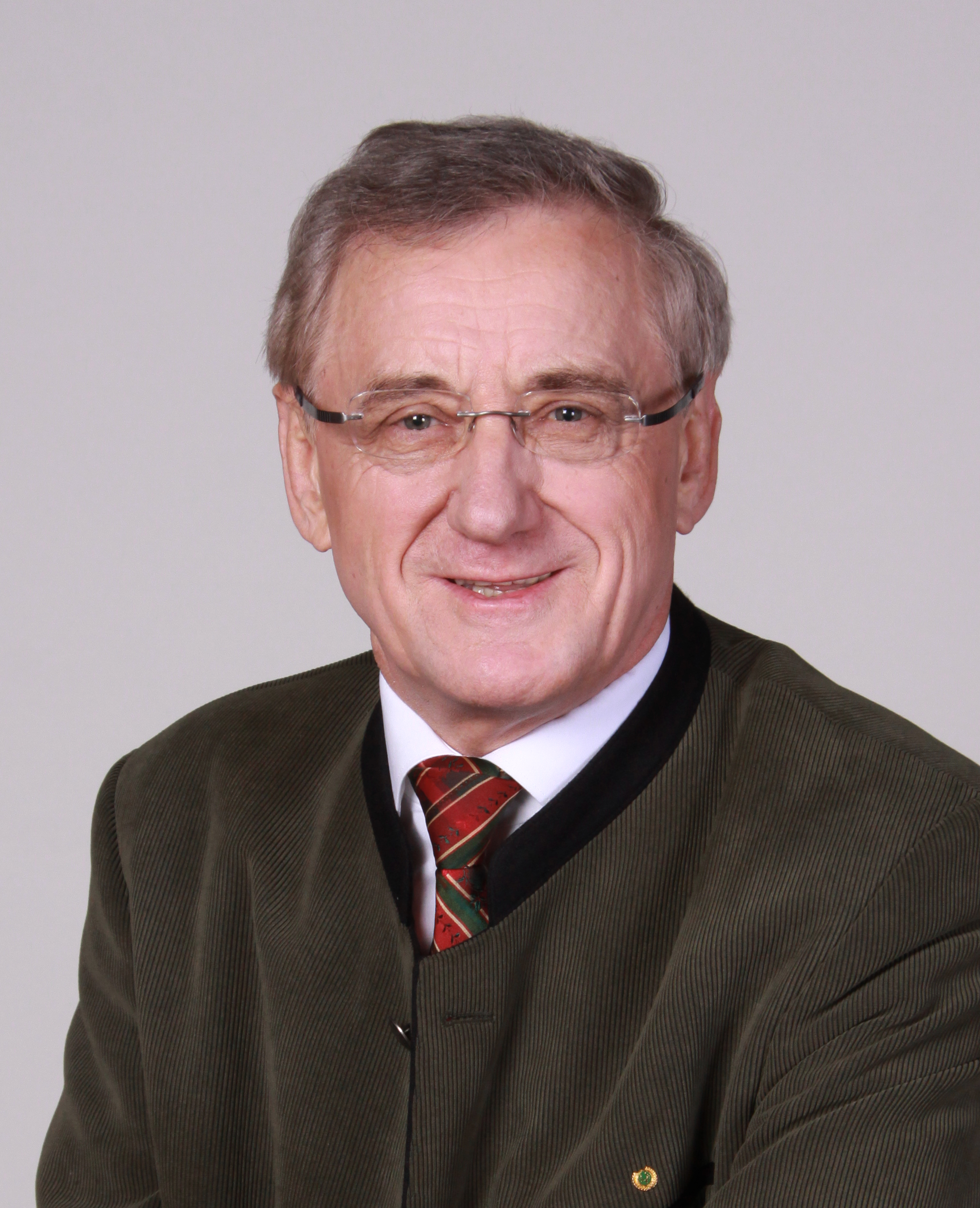
- Dess in 2014

Member of the European Parliament; for Germany
- In office 20 July 2004 – 12 April 2019

Member of the Bundestag; from Bavaria
- In office 20 December 1990 – 19 July 2004
- Preceded by: Multi-member district
- Succeeded by: Artur Auernhammer
- Constituency: State list

Personal details
- Born: 17 April 1947 (age 79) Berngau, Germany
- Party: Christian Social Union; European People's Party
- Children: 4

Albert Dess (German: Deß [dɛs]; born 17 April 1947) is a German politician who served as Member of the European Parliament (MEP) from 2004 until 2019. He is a member of the Christian Social Union in Bavaria, part of the European People's Party.

== Education and early career ==
Albert Dess graduated from Agricultural college in 1966. He obtained his Master's in agriculture in 1979. Albert had a Secondary occupation as farmer and worked in commerce and industry. He became managing director of a farming cooperative and in 1977, a Full-time farmer/training establishment.

== Political career ==
=== Career in local politics ===
In 1974 Albert Dess became the District Chairman of the Junge Union. In 1981 he became a Member of the CSU district executive and later in 1984, he became the Municipal Chairman of the CSU. He later rose in ranks by becoming the District Chairman in 1987, Regional Vice-chairman (1989–1995) and Regional Chairman (1995) of the CSU Agricultural Association. Albert was a Member of the CSU district executive from 1989 and in 1997, a member of the CSU Regional Executive Committee. From 1972 to 1996 he was in the Municipal Councillor, Berngau. He became a District Councillor, Neumarkt/Oberpfalz in 1978. In 1984–1996, he was the Vice-chairman of Neumarkt/Oberpfalz district council and from 1984 to 1996, the Mayor of Berngau.

=== Member of the German Parliament (1990–2004) ===
Albert Dess from 1992 to 2004 was the Farm policy spokesman for the CSU Regional Group in the Bundestag and from 1997 to 2004, a Member of the CDU/CSU Group Executive Committee. He later became the Chairman of the CSU Regional Group working party for Agriculture, Consumer Protection, Environment, Transport, Building and Energy from 2000 to 2004.

=== Member of the European Parliament (2004–2019) ===
Dess was a member of the European Parliament's Committee on Agriculture and Rural Development (AGRI). He was a substitute for the Committee on International Trade (INTRA), a member of the delegation for relations with Mercosur and a substitute for the delegation to the ACP-EU Joint Parliamentary Assembly.

In May 2018, Dess announced that he would not stand in the 2019 European elections but instead resign from active politics by the end of the parliamentary term.

== Controversy ==
Outside Germany, Dess is best known for trying to introduce in the European Parliament a Volkswagen-written piece of legislation that would have exempted a whole class of vehicle from pollution controls. The proposal was dropped after the Volkswagen emissions violation scandal erupted and Dress has thus far refused requests to comment on his actions.

== Recognition ==
- 1998: Bundesverdienstkreuz with ribbon

== See also ==
- 2004 European Parliament election in Germany
