= Sulz (Altmühl) =

River in Germany

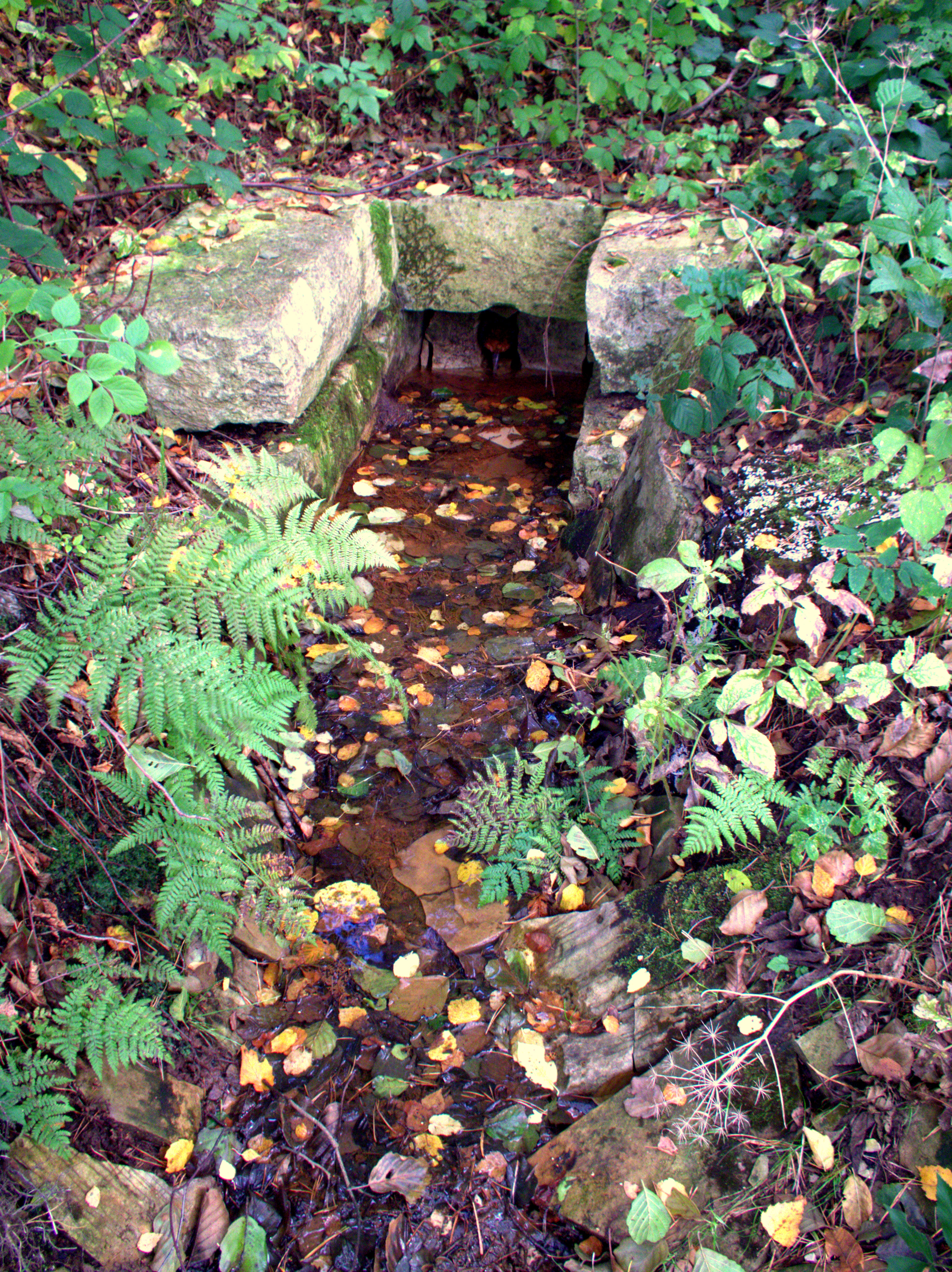
- The source of the Sulz at Tyrolsberg in Berngau

Location
- Country: Germany
- State: Bavaria

Physical characteristics
- Mouth
  - location: Altmühl
  - coordinates: 49.0277°N 11.4813°E

Basin features
- Progression: Altmühl→ Danube→ Black Sea

Sulz (German pronunciation: [zʊlts]) is a river of Bavaria, Germany. It flows parallel to the Rhine–Main–Danube Canal for much of its length. It is a left tributary of the Altmühl in Beilngries.

The Sulz River is integral to the local ecosystem and supports various community activities. For instance, the Altmühl-Sulz-Energie GmbH utilizes regional resources to provide sustainable heating solutions to municipalities, businesses, and households in Beilngries and Berching.

== See also ==
- List of rivers of Bavaria
