= Berg bei Neumarkt in der Oberpfalz =

Berg b.Neumarkt i.d.OPf.
- Municipality
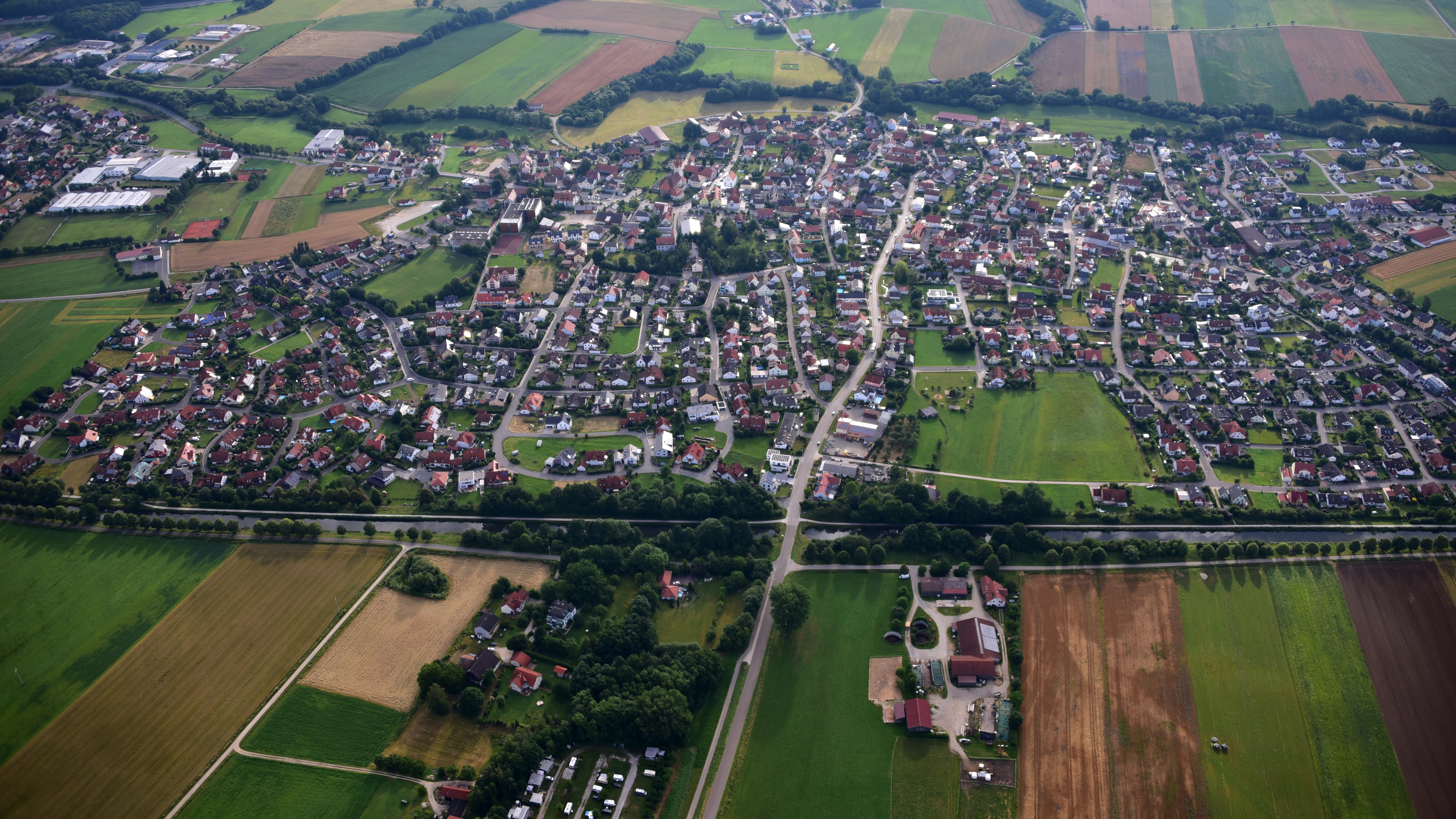
- Aerial view

- Coat of arms

- Location of Berg b.Neumarkt i.d.OPf. within Neumarkt in der Oberpfalz district
- Interactive map of Berg b.Neumarkt i.d.OPf.
- Location within Germany Location within Bavaria
- Coordinates: 49°19′N 11°26′E
- Country: Germany
- State: Bavaria
- Admin. region: Oberpfalz
- District: Neumarkt in der Oberpfalz

Government
  - Mayor (2020–26): Peter Bergler

Area
  - Total: 65.12 km^{2} (25.14 sq mi)
- Elevation: 406 m (1,332 ft)

Population (2025-12-31)
  - Total: 8,069
  - Density: 123.9/km^{2} (320.9/sq mi)
- Time zone: UTC+01:00 (CET)
  - Summer (DST): UTC+02:00 (CEST)
- Postal codes: 92348
- Dialling codes: 09189, 09187 und 09181
- Vehicle registration: NM
- Website: www.berg-opf.de

Berg bei Neumarkt in der Oberpfalz (German pronunciation: [ˈbɛʁk baɪ ˈnɔʏmaʁkt ʔɪn deːɐ̯ ˈʔoːbɐˌpfalts], lit. 'Berg near Neumarkt in der Oberpfalz') is a municipality in the district of Neumarkt in Bavaria in Germany.
