= Ludwig Stiegler =

German politician

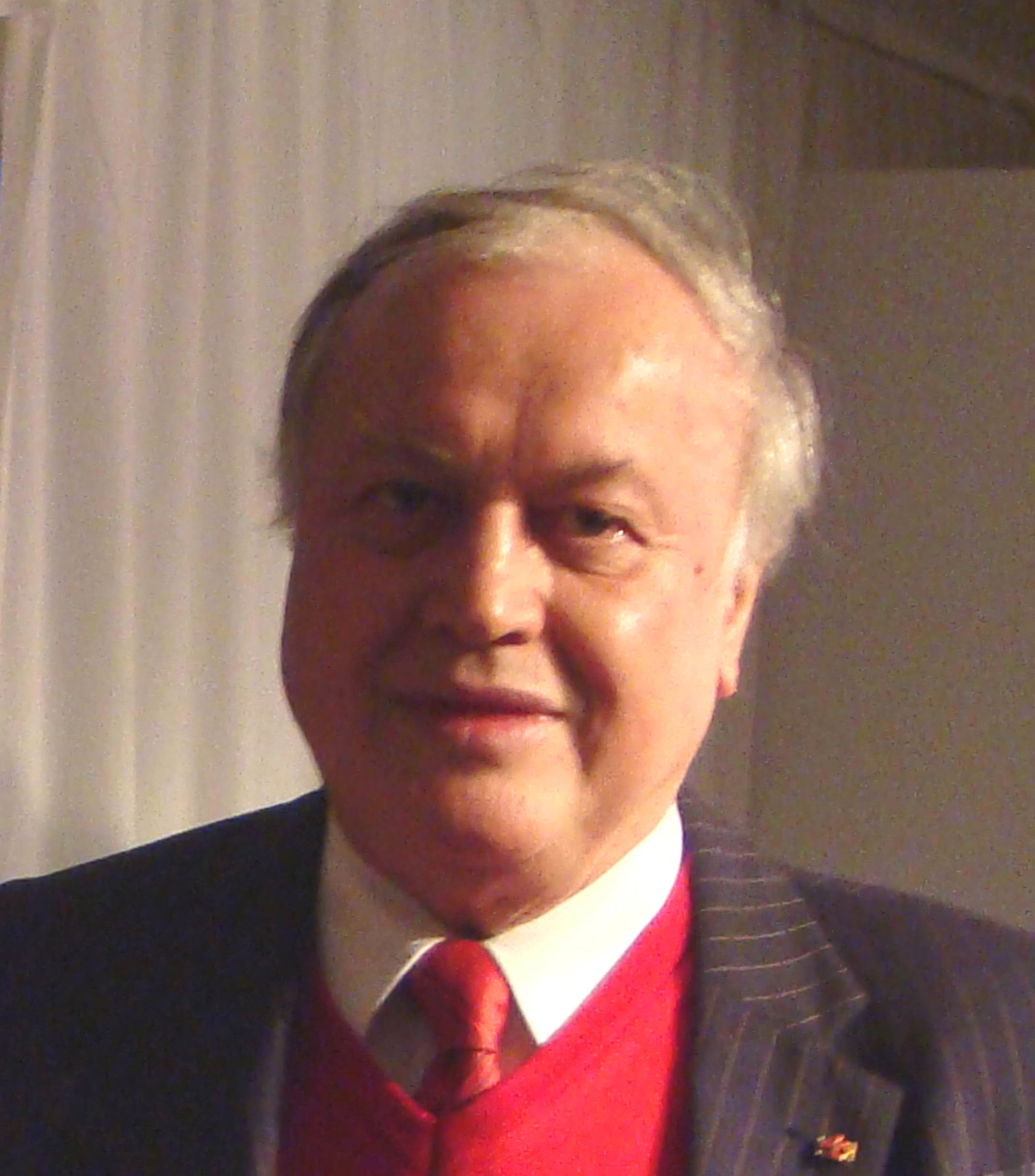
- Stiegler in 2009

Chairman of the SPD Parliamentary Group in the Bundestag
- In office 19 July 2002 – 23 September 2002
- Chancellor: Gerhard Schröder
- Preceded by: Peter Struck
- Succeeded by: Franz Müntefering

Personal details
- Born: 9 April 1944 (age 82) Parsberg
- Party: Social Democratic Party
- Education: LMU Munich; University of Bonn
- Profession: Lawyer

Ludwig Stiegler (born 9 April 1944 in Parsberg) is a German politician. He was chairman of the SPD's group in the Bundestag in 2002 and deputy chairman - with the exception of the period as a chairman - from 1998 to 2007. From 2003 to 2009, Stiegler was chairman of the SPD Bavaria.

== Education and early career ==
Stiegler finished high school in 1964. From 1964 to 1967 he was a soldier of the Bundeswehr. Afterwards he studied law, sociology and political science in Bonn and Munich. He finished in 1976 with the second juridical Staatsexamen (Bar examination). Since that he has worked as a lawyer.

== Political career ==
In 1964 Stiegler joined the SPD. Since 1999 he has been a member of the federal executive board and in 2005 he became a member of the SPD-Presidium. For a short period he was chairman of the party's parliamentary group (July–October 2002), before and afterwards he acted as deputy chairman (1998-2007). Stiegler has been a member of the Bundestag since 1980. In 2003 he was elected chairman of the SPD in the state of Bavaria and held this office until 2009.

== Controversies ==
Stiegler has been criticized several times for controversial statements. In July 2002 he said that the CDU and FDP didn't have the right to criticize then Federal Minister of the Interior and former RAF-lawyer Otto Schily in relation to the attempt to ban the far-right NPD, because "the forerunners of CDU and FDP helped bring Adolf Hitler to power."

In July 2005 he said that the only thing that came to his mind in relation to the CDU/CSU's slogan during the election campaign Sozial ist, was Arbeit schafft! ("Social is that which creates work") was the line at the door to Nazi Germany's death camp Auschwitz-Birkenau: "Arbeit macht frei" ("Work makes free").
