= Pyrbaum =

- Municipality
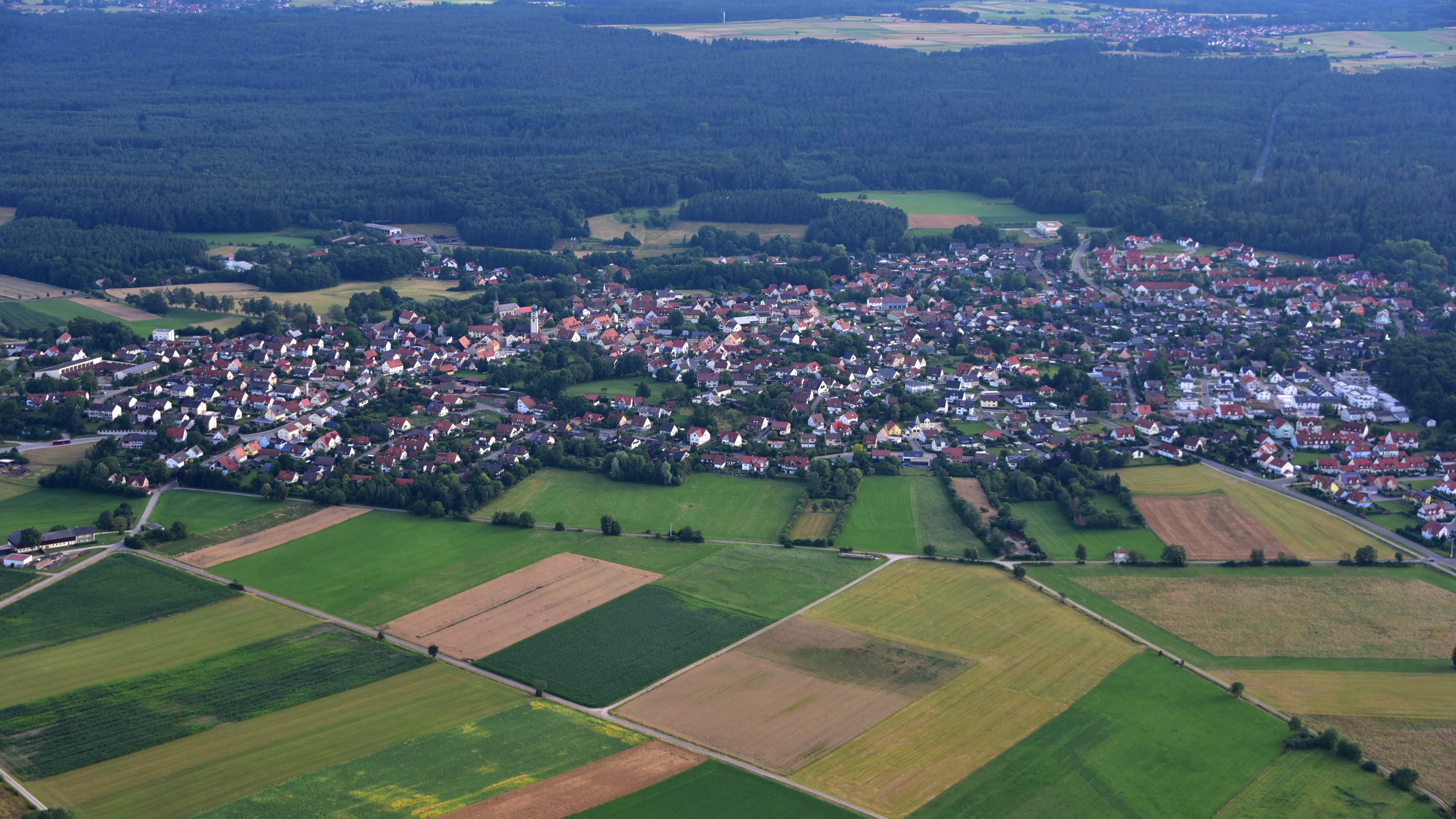
- Aerial view

- Coat of arms

- Location of Pyrbaum within Neumarkt in der Oberpfalz district
- Interactive map of Pyrbaum
- Location within Germany Location within Bavaria
- Coordinates: 49°17′54″N 11°17′22″E
- Country: Germany
- State: Bavaria
- Admin. region: Oberpfalz
- District: Neumarkt in der Oberpfalz
- Subdivisions: 14 Ortsteile

Government
  - Mayor (2020–26): Michael Langner (CSU)

Area
  - Total: 50.28 km^{2} (19.41 sq mi)
- Elevation: 438 m (1,437 ft)

Population (2025-12-31)
  - Total: 5,884
  - Density: 117.0/km^{2} (303.1/sq mi)
- Time zone: UTC+01:00 (CET)
  - Summer (DST): UTC+02:00 (CEST)
- Postal codes: 90602
- Dialling codes: 09180
- Vehicle registration: NM
- Website: pyrbaum.de

Pyrbaum is a municipality in the district of Neumarkt in Bavaria in Germany.
