= Lauterhofen =

- Municipality
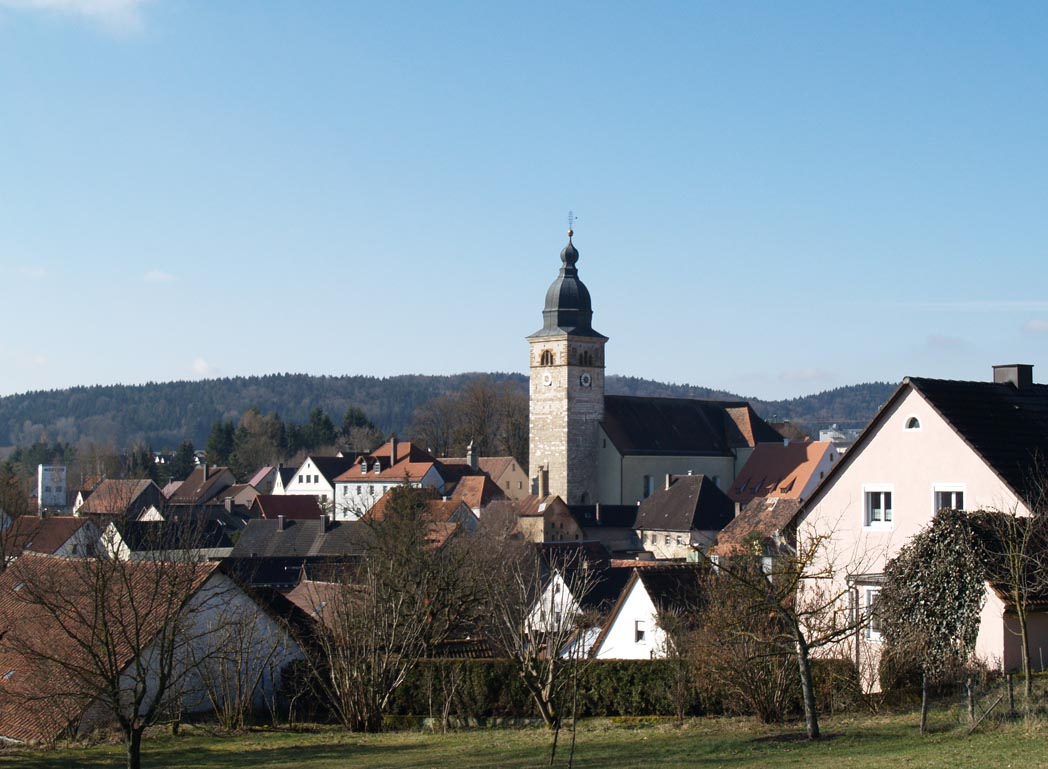
- View towards the village

- Coat of arms

- Location of Lauterhofen within Neumarkt in der Oberpfalz district
- Interactive map of Lauterhofen
- Location within Germany Location within Bavaria
- Coordinates: 49°22′N 11°37′E
- Country: Germany
- State: Bavaria
- Admin. region: Oberpfalz
- District: Neumarkt in der Oberpfalz
- Subdivisions: 9 Ortsteile

Government
  - Mayor (2020–26): Ludwig Lang (FW)

Area
  - Total: 78.55 km^{2} (30.33 sq mi)
- Elevation: 480 m (1,570 ft)

Population (2025-12-31)
  - Total: 3,737
  - Density: 47.57/km^{2} (123.2/sq mi)
- Time zone: UTC+01:00 (CET)
  - Summer (DST): UTC+02:00 (CEST)
- Postal codes: 92283
- Dialling codes: 09186
- Vehicle registration: NM
- Website: www.lauterhofen.de

Lauterhofen is a municipality in the district of Neumarkt in Bavaria in Germany.

== Notable people ==
- Engelbert Niebler (1921-2006), from 1975 to 1987 a judge at the Federal Constitutional Court and Honorary Professor of LMU Munich
- Frederick V (1596-1632), Count Palatine and Elector of the Palatinate from 1610 to 1623 and King of Bohemia (as Frederick I) from 1619 to 1620
- Max Sturm (1891-1958) composer, pianist, chorus and music teacher in Amberg
