= Lupburg =

- Municipality
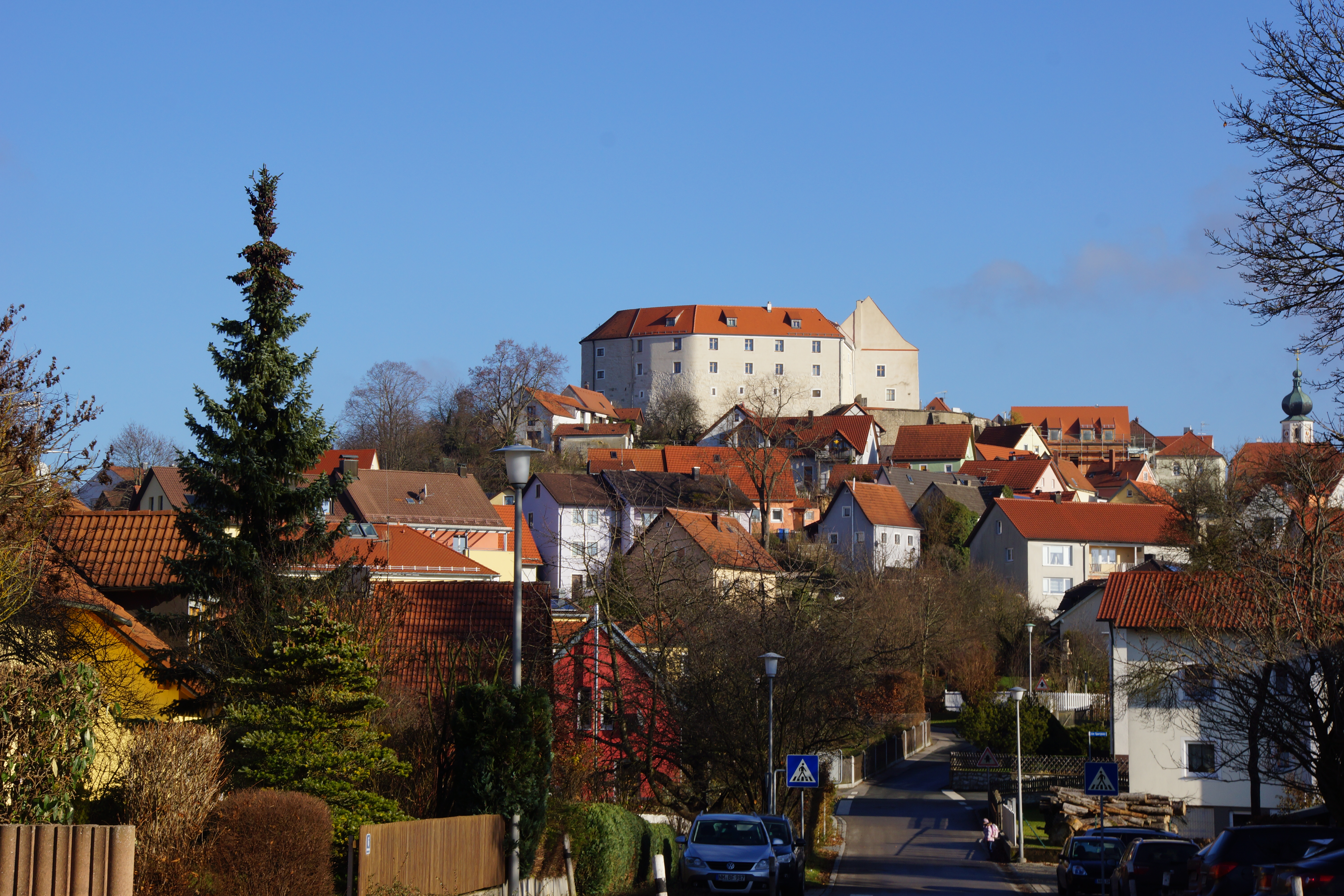
- Lupburg

- Coat of arms

- Location of Lupburg within Neumarkt in der Oberpfalz district
- Interactive map of Lupburg
- Location within Germany Location within Bavaria
- Coordinates: 49°09′N 11°45′E
- Country: Germany
- State: Bavaria
- Admin. region: Oberpfalz
- District: Neumarkt in der Oberpfalz
- Subdivisions: 2 Ortsteile

Government
  - Mayor (2020–26): Manfred Hauser (CSU)

Area
  - Total: 30.68 km^{2} (11.85 sq mi)
- Elevation: 532 m (1,745 ft)

Population (2025-12-31)
  - Total: 2,582
  - Density: 84.16/km^{2} (218.0/sq mi)
- Time zone: UTC+01:00 (CET)
  - Summer (DST): UTC+02:00 (CEST)
- Postal codes: 92331
- Dialling codes: 09492
- Vehicle registration: NM
- Website: www.lupburg.de

Lupburg is a municipality in the district of Neumarkt in Bavaria in Germany.

== Mayors ==
Manfred Hauser (CSU) was elected the new mayor in October 2015. He is the successor of Alfred Meier, who died in August 2015.

== Sightseeing ==
Notable sites include Lupburg Castle, which was destroyed by the Swedes in the Thirty Years War then restored in 2012-13. The castle now houses government administrative offices.The city also has a cobblestone market square, featuring a medieval church. The city of Parsberg and the U.S. Army installation at Hohenfels are nearby, as is the Altmuhl River valley. Numerous castles and ruins are in the area.

== Clubs ==
- The Society for Creative Anachronism has a local branch, the Stronghold of Nebelwald, which stretches from the Parsberg-Lupburg area in the far south to Vilseck in the north.

== Churches ==
- Like all of Bavaria, the city is predominantly Roman Catholic
- Latter-day Saints living in Lupburg belong to the Regensburg Branch of the Nuremberg Stake.
