= Pilsach =

- Municipality
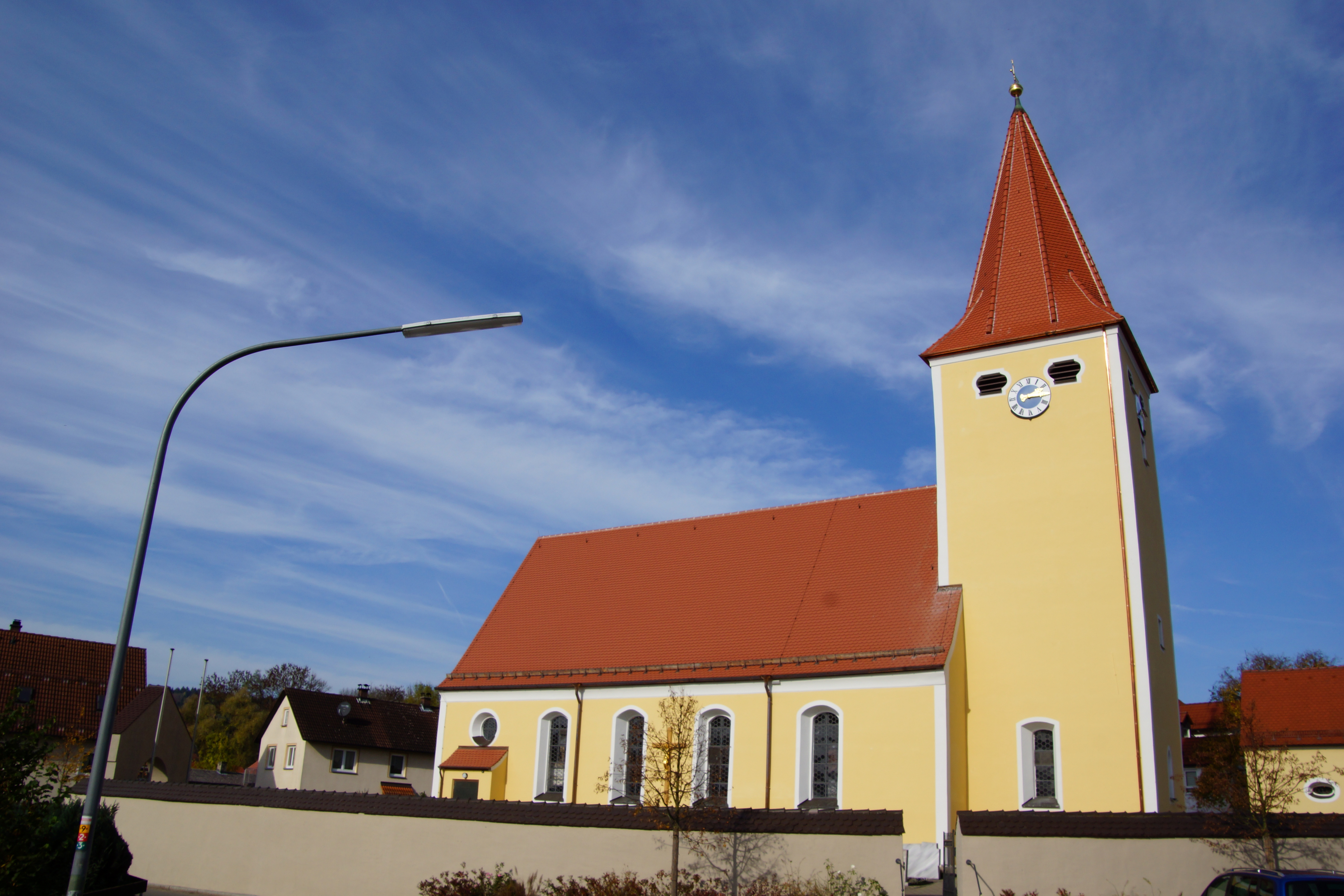
- Church of Saints Peter and Paul

- Coat of arms

- Location of Pilsach within Neumarkt in der Oberpfalz district
- Interactive map of Pilsach
- Location within Germany Location within Bavaria
- Coordinates: 49°19′N 11°30′E
- Country: Germany
- State: Bavaria
- Admin. region: Oberpfalz
- District: Neumarkt in der Oberpfalz
- Municipal assoc.: Neumarkt in der Oberpfalz

Government
  - Mayor (2020–26): Andreas Truber (CSU)

Area
  - Total: 47.72 km^{2} (18.42 sq mi)
- Elevation: 445 m (1,460 ft)

Population (2025-12-31)
  - Total: 2,892
  - Density: 60.60/km^{2} (157.0/sq mi)
- Time zone: UTC+01:00 (CET)
  - Summer (DST): UTC+02:00 (CEST)
- Postal codes: 92367
- Dialling codes: 09181
- Vehicle registration: NM
- Website: www.pilsach.de

Pilsach is a municipality in the district of Neumarkt in Bavaria in Germany.
