= Parsberg =

- Town
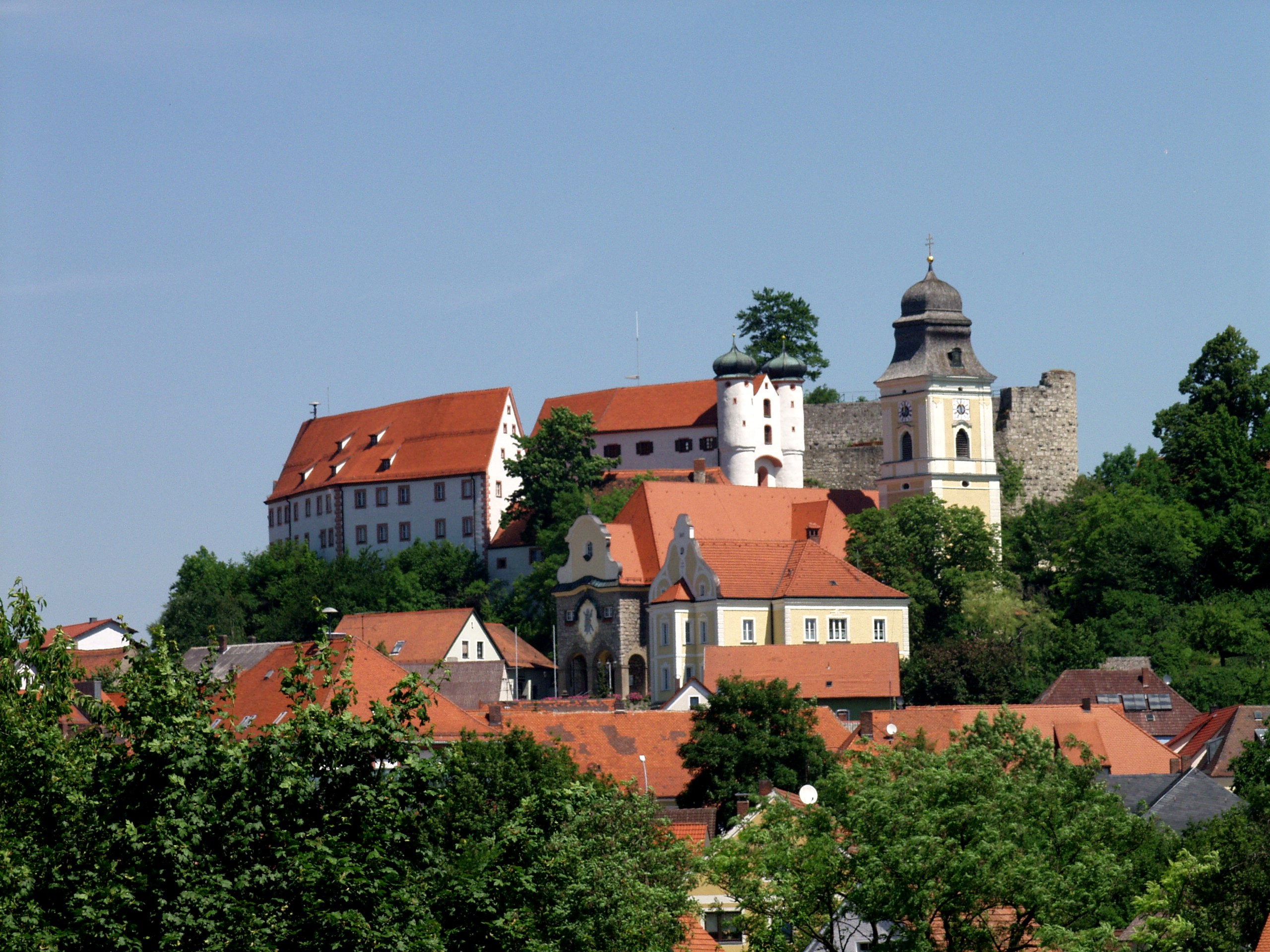
- Parsberg Castle and the Church of Saint Andrew

- Coat of arms

- Location of Parsberg within Neumarkt in der Oberpfalz district
- Interactive map of Parsberg
- Location within Germany Location within Bavaria
- Coordinates: 49°9′N 11°43′E
- Country: Germany
- State: Bavaria
- Admin. region: Oberpfalz
- District: Neumarkt in der Oberpfalz
- Subdivisions: 8 Ortsteile bzw. Stadtbezirke

Government
  - Mayor (2020–26): Josef Bauer (CSU)

Area
  - Total: 57.32 km^{2} (22.13 sq mi)
- Elevation: 553 m (1,814 ft)

Population (2025-12-31)
  - Total: 7,829
  - Density: 136.6/km^{2} (353.8/sq mi)
- Time zone: UTC+01:00 (CET)
  - Summer (DST): UTC+02:00 (CEST)
- Postal codes: 92331
- Dialling codes: 09492
- Vehicle registration: NM, PAR
- Website: www.parsberg.de

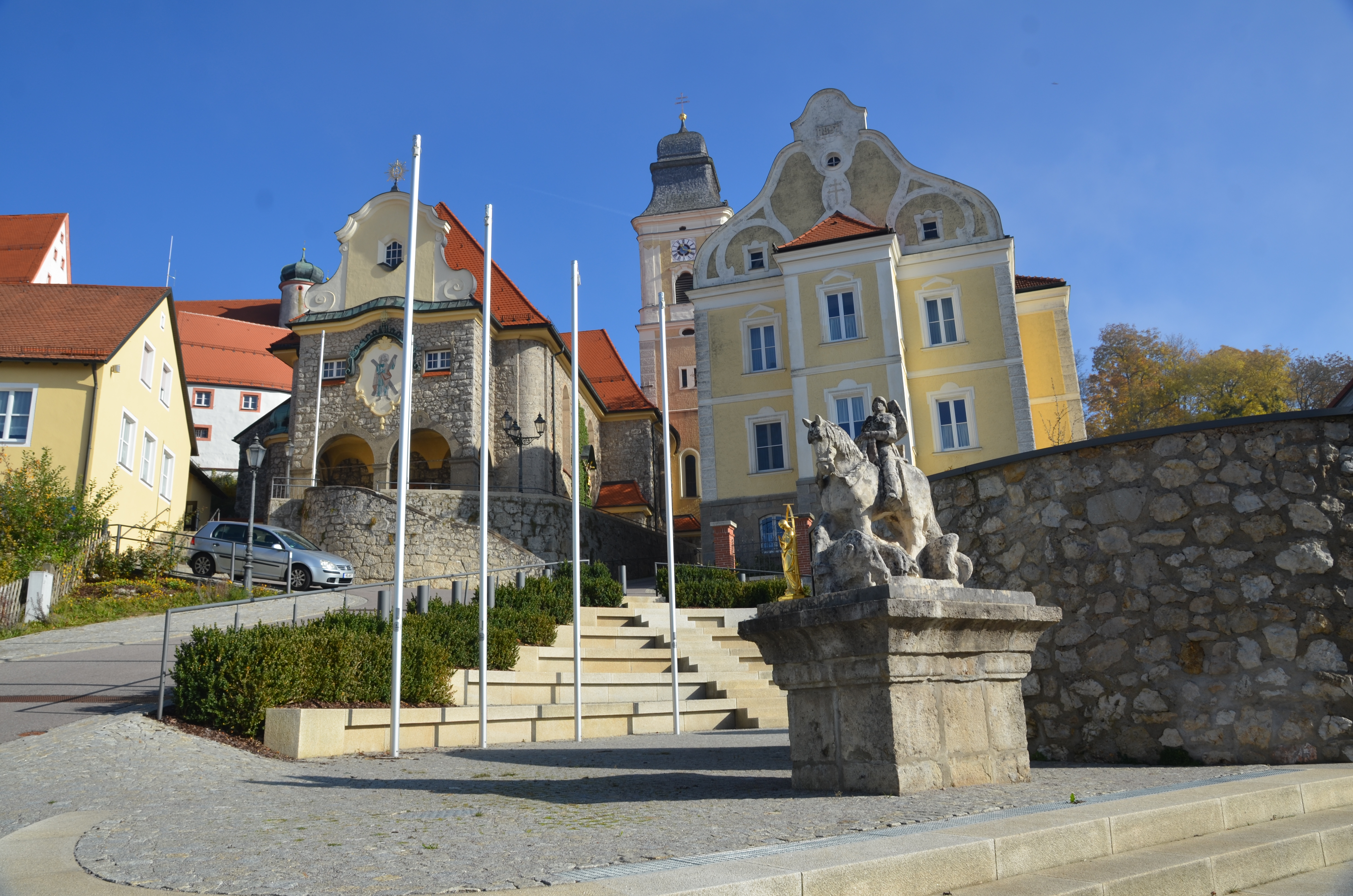
Parsberg

Parsberg (German pronunciation: [ˈpaʁsˌbɛʁk]) is a town in the county of Neumarkt in Bavaria, Germany. It is 23 km southeast of Neumarkt in der Oberpfalz, and 33 km northwest of Regensburg, next to the A3 autobahn, the main route from Nuremberg to Regensburg (and then on into Austria). It was formerly the seat of the Counts of Parsberg, whose coat of arms is now used by the town.

== People ==
- Ludwig Stiegler (born 1945), German politician (SPD)
- Konstantin Hierl (born 1875), German politician and Reichsarbeitsfuhrer of the Reichsarbeitsdienst
