= Virtual reality in primary education =

Educational application of virtual reality technologies

Virtual reality (VR) is a computer application which allows users to experience immersive, three dimensional visual and audio simulations. According to Pinho (2004), virtual reality is characterized by immersion in the 3D world, interaction with virtual objects, and involvement in exploring the virtual environment. The feasibility of the virtual reality in education has been debated due to several obstacles such as affordability of VR software and hardware. The psychological effects of virtual reality are also a negative consideration. However, recent technological progress has made VR more viable and promise new learning models and styles for students. These facets of virtual reality have found applications within the primary education (K-8th grade) sphere in enhancing student learning, increasing engagement, and creating new opportunities for addressing learning preferences. Recent research has provided further evidence for the educational potential of virtual reality in primary school physical education. A quasi-experimental study involving 56 primary school students reported that VR-based badminton instruction was associated with higher levels of student engagement and enjoyment than conventional teaching methods, supporting the use of immersive technologies in school-based physical education.

== General education ==
Virtual reality (VR) can be used in numerous ways in an educational setting. Seeing virtual reality as a continued improvement from PC-based simulation systems, researchers recognize its potential to provide special learning experiences which traditional education methods cannot. Although studies agree that restrictions still exist for classroom applications of virtual reality systems, researchers have been experimenting with using VR as part of the teaching method in many aspects of the general education.

Following are example attempts at applying virtual reality in classrooms.

=== Augmented reality ===
Augmented reality (AR) is a technology which superimposes virtual generated images on the real world. The coexistence of virtual objects and real environments have encouraged experimentation and developments in educational settings which are not possible in the real world.

A study done by Antonietti et al. (2000) found that giving children an in-depth virtual tour of a painting and letting them examine all aspects of the painting helped with their description and interpretation of the painting, when compared to a control group that studied the painting without the usage of VR. Another experiment was carried out on 91 sixth-grade primary students where they used an augmented reality application "WallaMe" which taught a didactic unit in art education. After analyzing the results, the study found a statistically significant improvements in academic performance, motivation, analysis of information, and collaboration.

Augmented reality has also had developments into more mainstream academic settings. 3D rendition of textbooks provide students with a more synergetic way of learning. The Institute for the Promotion of Teaching Science and Technology has launched a geology textbook which allows students to learn traditional information while virtually interacting with the different layers of the Earth's core.

Another benefit of augmented reality is capitalizing on different learning styles. While virtual reality provides a more immersive experience, augmented reality learning technologies favor on auditory learners. A study done on science information retention in college students showed AR to be a more effective medium for conveying auditory information through spacial presence.

=== Virtual field trips ===
In virtual field trips, students visit real-world places or educational simulations to experience different lessons. Google Expeditions allows students to take a shared field trip using smartphone headset technology under the control of a teacher's app. Nearpod's VR provides lesson plans in all core subjects for primary grades, and has been shown to increase student engagement in lessons.

Virtual field trips can also enable primary school students in rural areas to engage in career exploration opportunities not typically available. Field trips experiences are linked to an increase in interest and motivations to pursue those careers. One program, zipTrips, was designed to simulate the benefits of a life science career exploration field trip for middle school students. By harnessing the power of virtual reality, zipTrips allowed students to engage in live 45 minute field trips with scientists and their work. Students are shown to have an enhanced perception of science and scientific careers.

=== Individualized learning ===
Although VR can be used cooperatively, learning has been shown to be especially effective when VR is utilized for independent learning. Merchant et al. (2014) found that "students performed [significantly] better when they worked individually rather than collaboratively when learning through [VR based collaborative learning environments]". Some VR applications provide independent learning opportunities when combined with individual lesson plans. For example, students might fill out a worksheet in correspondence with a specific virtual reality simulation.

=== Virtual World ===
Virtual worlds, or three-dimensional immersive virtual worlds in full, is an interactive online environment where people use avatars as their representations. The environment can be designed in any context, and users control their avatars to accomplish tasks in virtual worlds. An academic review on past empirical research identified three main areas virtual worlds are used in school settings: (1) communication spaces, (2) simulation of space, and (3) experiential spaces.

Communication spaces refers to the communication between users, possibly between teachers and students. Communication takes in both verbal and nonverbal forms, using applications of the chat function and avatar movements respectively. The second use of virtual worlds is simulation of space. Space is one of the most important elements in virtual worlds in terms of its scalability and authenticity with great feasibility of simulating any environment. In an educational initiative, the environment can be built in a school setting to resonate with students as if they are actually in school. The Nanyang Technological University in Singapore developed a virtual campus tour for its prospective students. The virtual campus displays general information but also familiarize students with the campus before physically being there. The third main feature of virtual worlds is its experiential spaces, which allow students to "learn by doing" instead of learning by reading or listening. With virtual worlds, students can directly act on the subject, "observe the outcomes of their actions" and further reflect on the observable outcomes.

=== Music education ===
Because of budget cuts and restrictions such as disabilities, music education in K-12 is facing challenges, with which researchers are looking at virtual reality technology for help. Virtual interfaces with interactive visualization and audio feedback are being experimented with to improve the experience of learning a musical instrument for students. Other attempts include offering simulated experiences of playing musical instruments through head-mounted display devices.

A study shows that a mix of virtual and traditional education can effectively improve music learning results, despite concerns for physical and pedagogical problems including virtual sickness and isolation. The usage of virtual reality in K-12 music education is still widely in experimentation, while research has presented promising results. Some researchers suggest that although attempts with VR showed effectiveness, augmented reality may be preferable in practice because of its support of interaction with real instruments or objects.

=== History education ===
With its established ability to create immersive simulated experiences, virtual reality is being evaluated for enhancing the teaching methods for history classes. Research on teaching the history of the Roman Empire with a virtual reconstruction of a Roman city shows significant improve in the learning experiences and academic results for the students. Researchers suggest that the increase in motivation for learning, enhanced interactivity, and the immersive experience are likely key to the success of the experiment, and hold interest for conducting larger-scaled studies on teaching history with virtual reality.

== Social skills and collaboration ==
VR also has uses within primary education for social-emotional development.

=== Collaboration ===
VR has applications for development of social skills and multi-user cooperation. It can provide opportunities for students to collaborate through cooperative simulations, and has been shown to support introverted students in their group interactions. One study found VR-based collaboration to create "superior collaboration and interaction in the development of outcomes, as compared with other situations where group structures were used."

=== Autism ===
Autism, also known as Autism Spectrum Disorder, is a series of developmental disorders that impair the abilities of communicating and interacting with other people. While autism typically appears during early childhood, around 1 in 59 children is identified with the autistic condition according to a datasets put up by CDC's Autism and Developmental Disabilities Monitoring Network. To combat the negative impacts of autism in learning and socializing in school settings, attempts of using VR to increase students' adaptation are on the rise.

VR simulations have been shown to help children with autism by providing a virtual world in which they can learn to handle real-life scenarios within safe and controlled virtual environments. A study by Strickland et al. (2007) found that children with autism could successfully use virtual worlds to learn skills in fire and street safety, and could apply those skills to real-life situations. One method to facilitate learning experience of autistic students is using virtual reality head-mounted displays (HMDs). According to a study that examines the coping behaviors of using VR headsets in school settings of 32 autistic students between age 6 and age 16, a general preference for "costly and technologically advanced HMDs" and positive attitudes towards the use of VR technologies, such as enjoyment and excitement are found among students. "Developing learning opportunities" and "going places virtually and seeing what the world looks like" are the two primary areas autistic students expect to use HMDs in school for. HMDs also exerts great potential in the future of learning, including relaxing students and creating more learning opportunities at school.

Another method is immersing students in virtual scenarios that are common for school settings. Using "a 4-side fully immersive CAVETM VR installation", it simulates an environment that is "an authentic, safe, controllable and manipulable" to train autistic students to become adaptive in social situations. An example of the scenario is a series of the preparation steps that students normally take before going to school, including brushing teeth, having breakfast and catching school bus. In a study that examines 100 students' behavior after accepting the training, noticeable changes are shown in "emotion recognition, affective expression and social reciprocity".

== Business and academic reception ==
The use of virtual reality in primary education has been supported by grants from foundations and venture capital firms. The IEEE held workshops on "K-12 Embodied Learning through Virtual & Augmented Reality (KELVAR)" in 2016 and 2017.

Despite the interest in virtual reality for K-12 education within business and academia, skepticism of its usefulness for K-12 learners has also been expressed. A 2009 review of the literature concluded that only the most independent, intrinsically motivated, and highly skilled K-12 students succeeded with VR. This review traced the problem to a lack of experience with gearing virtual reality to K-12 specifically; most of the experience had been with VR software designed for adults.

== Challenges and Concerns ==
Even though Virtual Reality may be a good supporting tool for students in their studies, there are still certain concerns and challenges that Virtual Reality faces in Primary Education.

=== Detrimental Effects ===
There are potential physical, physiological, and psychological problems for users associated with the Virtual Reality system today.

Since Virtual reality is a simulated environment, simulator sickness is a concern for the user. Wearing Virtual Reality headset for a long period of time could cause discomfort and poor depth perception for students. This is potentially caused by the short distance between the electronic screen and the eyes of the user.

Other potential symptoms include nausea, fatigue, dizziness, headache, and sweating.

=== User safety ===
One downside of the fully immersive environment is that the user is not able to sense the real world objects around once he or she goes into the virtual world. Hence, with some amount of required movement during Virtual Reality immersion, collision with real world object becomes a concern because users may easily run into an obstacle and get hurt. In addition, many Virtual Reality equipment sets also include sound cues, and that may block the sense of hearing for sounds in the real world. Without real world sound inputs, users cannot take in notices from others during an accident.

=== Distinguishing Reality ===
Similar to video games, a user may become addicted to the world that Virtual Reality technology provides.

Virtual Reality immersion can cause a situation where students cannot distinguish reality and virtual reality. This confusion about the real world may result in negative impact on a student's physical safety as they might not differentiate dangerous situations happening towards them. Also, students could become confused as they are overloaded by the virtual information they need to learn, complex equipment they need to master, and tasks they need to finish.

=== Culture ===
Virtual Reality is still not a technology that is taken seriously and accepted by some people, because they consider it as a game. The attitudes of students can change between whether their task is playing a game, or to think critically and obtain knowledge. Hence, time and effort is needed to spread the potential and positive knowledge of the helpfulness of Virtual Reality in education.

=== Price ===
In order to become a primary educational tool, Virtual Reality equipment has to be accessible to every student in the class, instead of inefficiently using one shared Virtual Reality headset and takes up valuable learning time. With low end equipment, users will get low end experiences, while high end Virtual Reality equipment would cost hundreds or even thousands of dollars. In order to provide the best Virtual Reality educational environment for students, the use and the affordability of Virtual Reality equipment needs to be considered.

=== Privacy ===
As the equipment get smaller in size, the infrastructures that stores data behind gets larger. If Virtual Reality technology become mass used in the same environment, the individual systems and the immersive perceptions of users will be networked together. A large network allows the collection of data from users, and this can lead to a potential surveillance situation where the individual privacy of users are tracked by others and exposed to others.
