= Neumarkt (district) =

Coordinates: 49°15′N 11°30′E

- District
- Flag Coat of arms
- Country: Germany
- State: Bavaria
- Adm. region: Upper Palatinate
- Capital: Neumarkt

Government
  - District admin.: Willibald Gailler (CSU)

Area
  - Total: 1,344 km^{2} (519 sq mi)

Population (31 December 2025)
  - Total: 138,902
  - Density: 103.3/km^{2} (267.7/sq mi)
- Time zone: UTC+01:00 (CET)
  - Summer (DST): UTC+02:00 (CEST)
- Vehicle registration: NM, PAR
- Website: landkreis-neumarkt.de

Neumarkt (German: [ˈnɔʏmaʁkt]) is a Landkreis (district) in Bavaria, Germany. It is bounded by (from the north and clockwise) the districts of Nürnberger Land, Amberg-Sulzbach, Schwandorf, Regensburg, Kelheim, Eichstätt and Roth.

== History ==
In early medieval times the region was ruled by the counts of Wolfstein, while the city of Neumarkt was directly subordinate to the emperor and hence independent from the Wolfstein family. In the 14th century, the counts of Wolfstein, as well as the city of Neumarkt, became subordinate to the Electorate of the Palatinate, and in 1628 to Bavaria.

Below is an outline of the history of Neumarkt, from its founding in the 12th century to its destruction in World War II. The town's development can be divided into 5 periods:

The beginnings of Neumarkt: The "new market" is founded on an important long-distance trade route. Neumarkt falls under the rule of the Wittelsbach dynasty and is allotted to the Palatinate on the Rhine with the partitioning of the territory in 1329.

Neumarkt as seat of the Palatinate Counts: In the 15th century, Neumarkt become the seat of collateral lines of the Palatinate Counts. Count Palatine Frederick II transferred his residence from Amberg to Neumarkt and had constructed a palace.

The Reformation in Neumarkt: Neumarkt converts to the Lutheran faith. The introduction of Calvinism causes disturbance.

The rise of industry in Neumarkt: Reflecting the general development in Bavaria, the transition of Neumarkt from a country town to an industrial center during the 19th century proceeds rather slowly and in small steps.

The destruction of Neumarkt in World War II: On 23 February and 11 April 1945, Neumarkt is heavily bombed. The resistance of the SS results in the destruction of the town.

The district in its present shape was established in 1972, when the city of Neumarkt lost its status as an urban district and was incorporated into the district.

== Geography ==
The district is located in the mountains of the Franconian Jura. The southern parts are occupied by the Altmühl Valley Nature Park.

=== Nature reserves ===
- Deusmauer Moor
- Albtrauf bei Pollanten
- Weiße Laaber bei Waltersberg
- Neumarkter Sanddünen
- Tal der Weißen Laaber bei Deining
- Vogelfreistätte Schwarzachwiesen bei Freystadt
- Wolfsberg bei Dietfurt

== Coat of arms ==
The coat of arms displays three lions.
The yellow lion was the heraldic animal of the Electorate of the Palatinate.
The red lions were the arms of the Wolfstein dynasty.

== Towns and municipalities ==
Clickable map of towns and municipalities in the district

Towns
1. Berching
2. Dietfurt
3. Freystadt
4. Neumarkt
5. Parsberg
6. Velburg
Märkte
1. Breitenbrunn
2. Hohenfels
3. Lauterhofen
4. Lupburg
5. Postbauer-Heng
6. Pyrbaum
Municipalities
1. Berg bei Neumarkt in der Oberpfalz
2. Deining
3. Mühlhausen
4. Seubersdorf

Verwaltungsgemeinschaften

1. Neumarkt in der Oberpfalz

1. Berngau
2. Pilsach
3. Sengenthal
