= Neumarkt in der Oberpfalz =

Neumarkt in der Oberpfalz Naimakk in da Owerpfolz (Bavarian)
- Town
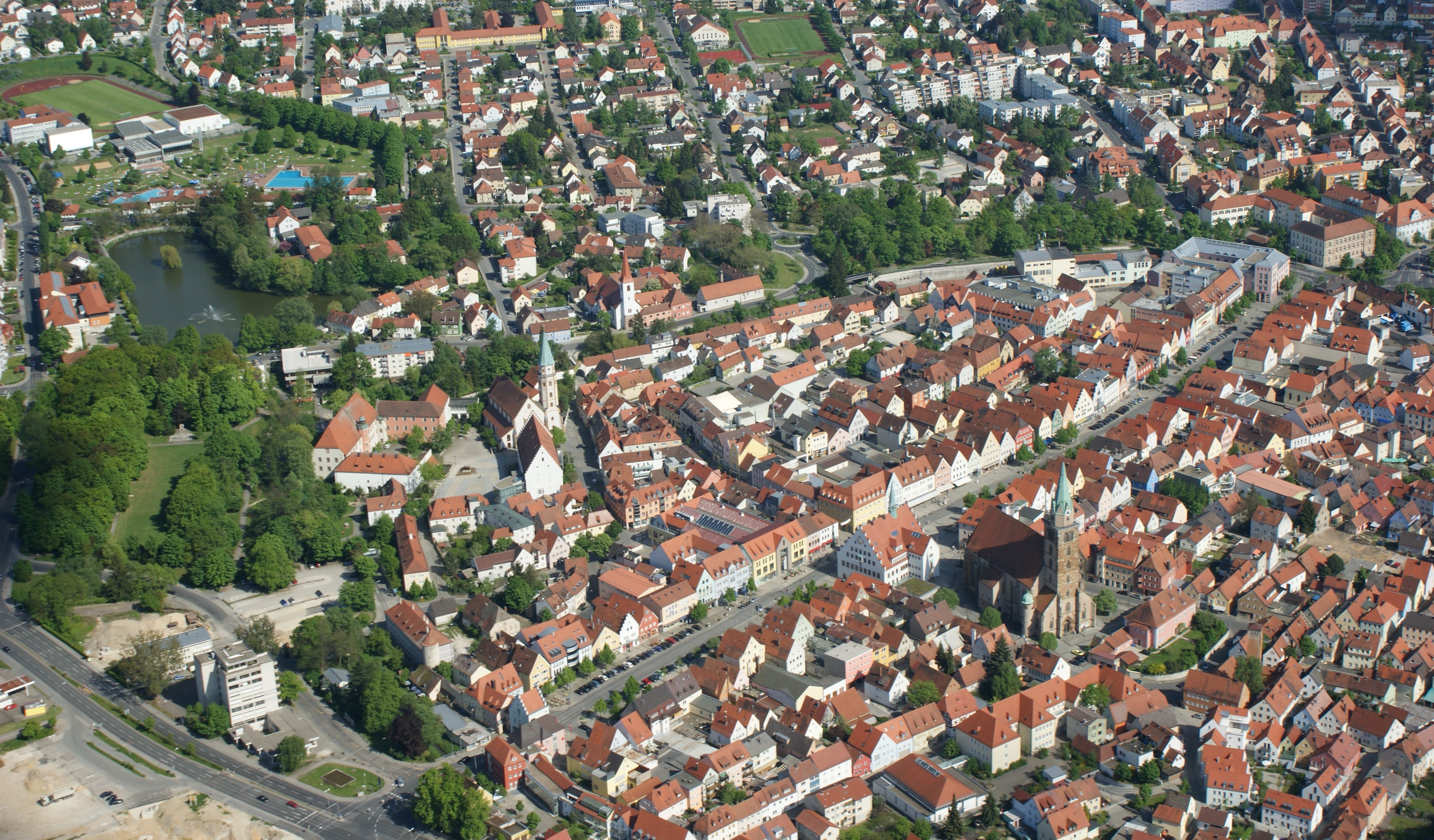
- Aerial view of Neumarkt

- Coat of arms

- Location of Neumarkt in der Oberpfalz within Neumarkt in der Oberpfalz district
- Interactive map of Neumarkt in der Oberpfalz
- Location within Germany Location within Bavaria
- Coordinates: 49°17′N 11°28′E
- Country: Germany
- State: Bavaria
- Admin. region: Oberpfalz
- District: Neumarkt in der Oberpfalz

Government
  - Mayor (2023–29): Markus Ochsenkühn (CSU)

Area
  - Total: 79.01 km^{2} (30.51 sq mi)
- Elevation: 424 m (1,391 ft)

Population (2025-12-31)
  - Total: 41,258
  - Density: 522.2/km^{2} (1,352/sq mi)
- Time zone: UTC+01:00 (CET)
  - Summer (DST): UTC+02:00 (CEST)
- Postal codes: 92318
- Dialling codes: 09181
- Vehicle registration: NM, PAR
- Website: www.neumarkt.de

Neumarkt in der Oberpfalz (German: [ˈnɔʏmaʁkt ʔɪn deːɐ̯ ˈʔoːbɐˌpfalts], lit. 'Neumarkt in the Upper Palatinate'; Bavarian: Naimakk in da Owerpfolz) is the capital of the Neumarkt district in the administrative region of the Upper Palatinate, in Bavaria, Germany. With a population of about 40,000, Neumarkt is the seat of various projects, and acts as the economic and cultural center of the western Upper Palatinate, along with Nürnberg, Ingolstadt, and Regensburg.

== Geography ==
Neumarkt lies on the western edge of the Franconian Jura, nestled in a valley. The municipal region reaches as far as the Bavarian Jura to the east. The Neumarkt valley drains to the north through the Schwarzach River, a tributary of the Regnitz, eventually flowing into the Main, and to the south through the Sulz, a tributary of the Altmühl, which eventually flows into the Danube. The Ludwig Canal cuts through the area from North to South, bridging the European water divide. The elevation varies from 406 meters on the Beckenmühle River to the north, to 595 meters in the vicinity of Fuchsberg; as a reference, the elevation of city hall is given as 423 meters.

The municipal region has an area of 73.09 km^{2}. The following municipalities, all of which belong to the Neumarkt district, border the district capital. They are named clockwise, beginning in the north: Berg, Pilsach, Velburg, Deining, Sengenthal, Berngau and Postbauer-Heng.

=== Geology ===
Neumarkt is located on the western edge of a former Coral Reef (now called the Franconian Jura) of the Tethys Ocean during the Jurassic. The floor of the valley is predominately sandy, whence came the earlier name Neumarkt auf dem Sand (Neumarkt on the Sand), on the sides are isolated regions of loam. The mountains are formed of hard Limestone containing numerous springs, including, for example, the source of the White Laber River near Voggenthal.

=== Municipal subdivision ===
The core of the municipal area is the Old City and its still-recognized borders. The first housing developments built outside the city walls began in 1850 to the east, along Mühlstraße, Mariahilfstraße, and Badstraße. To the south, the Industrial area developed beginning around 1920. After 1945, the city expanded to the north and west, and eventually grew together with the municipalities of Woffenbach and Holzheim. Numerous other settlements developed around the city center, named, going clockwise from the north: Altenhof, Koppenmühle, Kohlenbrunnermühle, Mühlen, Wolfstein (at the site of the former Prison Work Camp), Weinberg, Schlosserhügel, and Hasenheide.

During the 1972 Municipality Reforms, nine municipalities were merged with the city, substantially increasing the municipal area.

== History ==
Traces of the earliest settlement at Neumarkt go back as far as the Neolithic period. Around Neumarkt there are numerous burial mounds and multiple Celtic embankments. The town is assumed to have been first founded by the Bavarii in the 6th or 7th century, for example, the quarter of the city now named Pölling.

The precise date of the city's founding is unknown, but its founding as "neuer Markt" is assumed to have happened in the beginning of the 12th century, on the trade route between Nuremberg and Regensburg. The city was first mentioned in a document in 1135, and city fortifications were mentioned for the first time in 1315. In the 13th century Emperor Frederick II granted Neumarkt Reichsfreiheit, and with it, the right to collect customs on trade between Nuremberg and Regensburg and itself. However, the city never enforced this status, because the city fell to the Wittelsbachs in 1329 through the Treaty of Pavia.

In the 15th and 16th centuries, Neumarkt was the residence of the rulers of the Palatinate. Count Johann von Pfalz-Neumarkt established the seat of his government here, and began to develop the city into a residency. Included in his work are the church of St. Johannes, the Court Chapel, and the castle of the counts of the Palatinate. Johann was succeeded by Counts Otto I, his son Otto II, and Frederick II, who later became an Elector, and moved to Heidelberg.

A panorama of castle ruin Wolfstein, March 2013

After the Palatinate Counts left, Neumarkt lost much of its importance. Subsequently, the city played a part in political and economic life only for the surrounding area, and the growth of the city stopped almost entirely. The next perceptible period of growth did not occur until the middle of the 19th century. In the Thirty Years' War, Neumarkt was occupied by Swedish troops from 1633 to 1635 and from 1646 to 1649. Both times the city was plundered and partially destroyed.

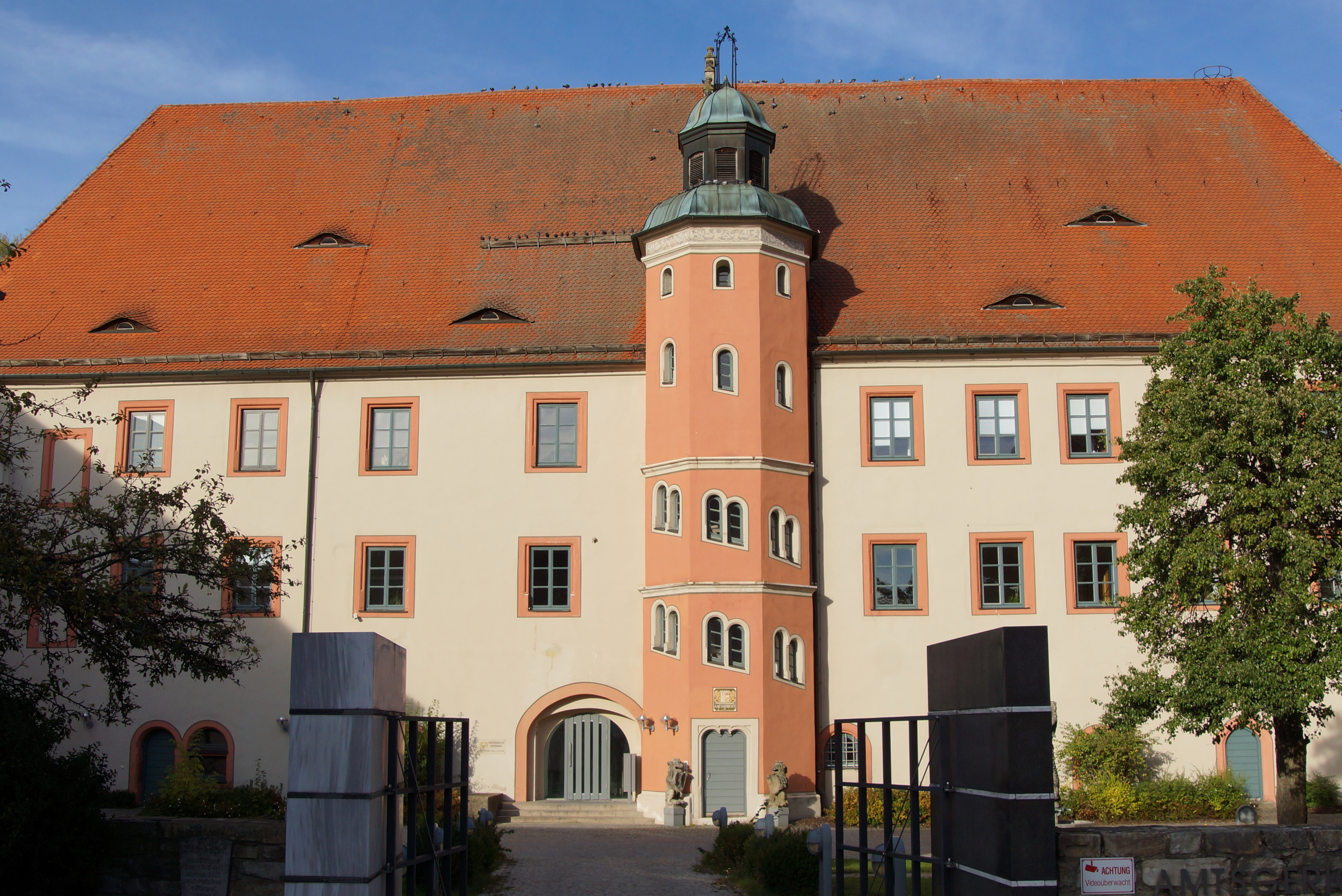
Castle of the Palatinate Counts

During the war of the First Coalition a dramatic encounter between the French and Austria troops occurred in Neumarkt in the Summer of 1796. The French barricaded themselves in the city and the Austrians began its complete destruction. Only through the intervention of a smith from Neumarkt, who single-handedly opened the upper gate, was something worse averted. Neumarkt attained the status of Bavarian imperial city, and was the seat of a district court after the Kingdom of Bavaria was formed by Napoleon in 1806.

In the 19th century Neumarkt gradually developed into an industrial center. Beginning in 1830, thousands of laborers worked on the Ludwigskanal in the vicinity of Neumarkt, the completion of which, in 1846, made Neumarkt a port city. The Express-Werken, established in Neumarkt in 1884, were continental Europe's first bicycle factory.

The economic and political results of World War I were quickly noticeable in Neumarkt. Over 300 of its young men fell on the battlefield.

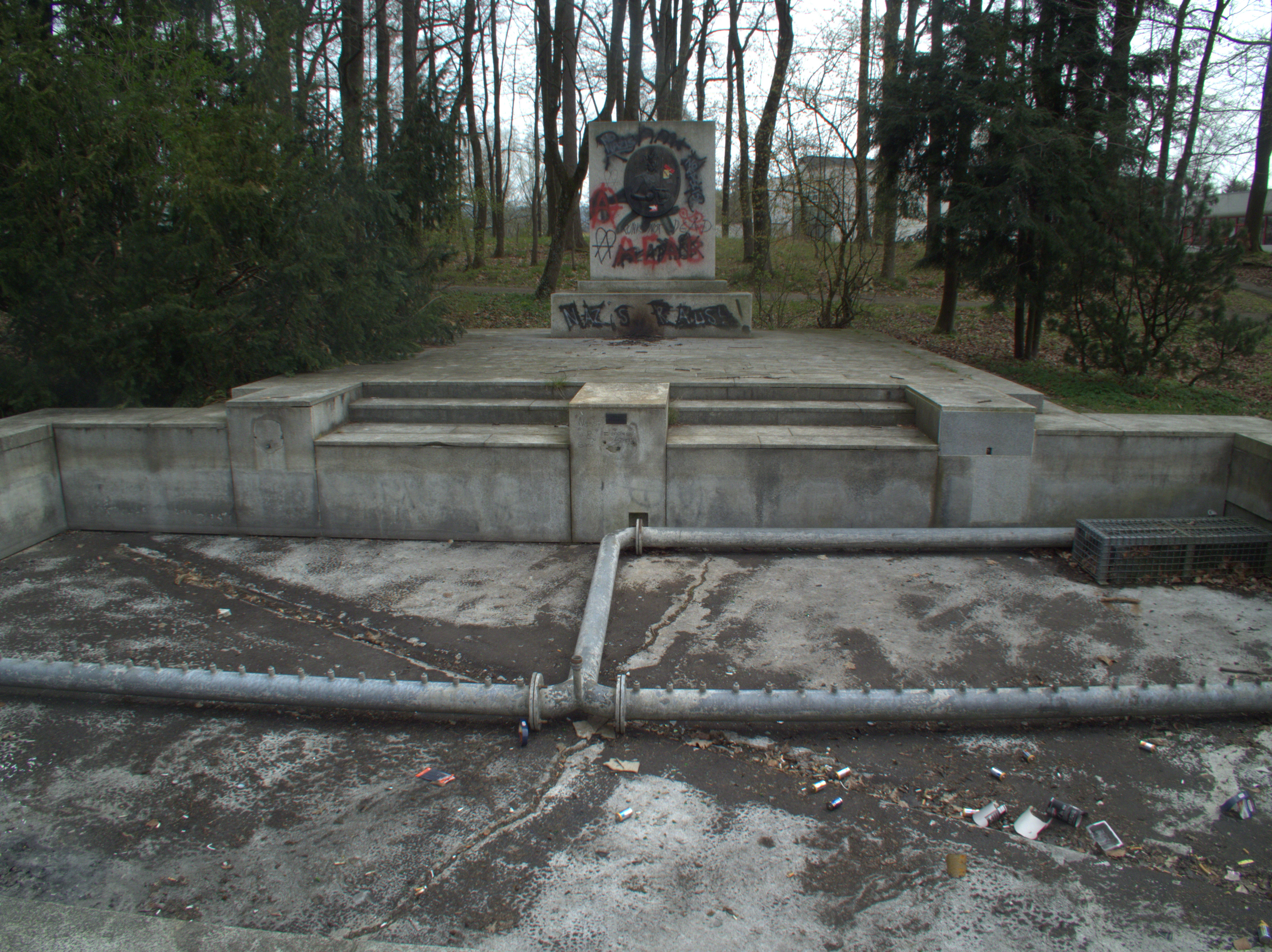
The remains of the former Dietrich Eckart memorial in Neumarkt, covered in both neo-Nazi and anti-Nazi graffiti

In September 1923 one of the first local chapters of the Nazi Party was founded in Neumarkt, which appeared publicly on September 23 for "German Day". The chapter was created shortly before the death of Dietrich Eckart, one of the founders of the Nazi party, who was born in Neumarkt. The removal of active party members, however, led to its quick disintegration. The party was not reorganized in Neumarkt until 1928. In 1934, in memory of Eckart, the town was officially given the added suffix "Dietrich-Eckart-city". In that year, Adolf Hitler inaugurated a monument in Eckart's honour in the city park. It has since been rededicated to Christopher of Bavaria (1416-1448), King of Denmark, who was probably born in the town.

Shortly before the end of World War II, Neumarkt was largely destroyed by two air raids of the USAAF on February 23, 1945 (Operation Clarion) and April 11, 1945. During the first attack, a direct hit on the train station bunker killed 400 people, mostly refugees in a train coming from Hungary. At the Expresswerke factory, 90 Soviet forced-laborers and one German guard died. One hundred residents of the city died in the sea of flames caused by the second attack. During the second raid (71 planes of the Eighth Air Force) bombs missed their intended targets and struck the city center instead, causing severe damages.

Attempts by the population to surrender the city to American troops without a fight were thwarted by SS troops stationed in Neumarkt, who were further reinforced by a Hungarian SS division. It was not until April 22, 1945, when the SS resistance was broken after a house-to-house battle, that American troops captured the city.

As part of the 1972 administrative reform (de), the independent city of Neumarkt was incorporated into the Neumarkt district on June 1 and designated as the district seat. A project to revitalize the cityscape began in 1990.

== Economy ==
The Lammsbräu Brewery is located in the town.

== Sports ==
Neumarkt offers sport activities like martial arts (Judo, Karate, Taekwondo, Aikido, Boxing and Thai boxing) as well as table tennis, wheelchair sports, athletics, bowling, volleyball, wrestling and tennis. league and wrestling.

== Twin towns – sister cities ==
Neumarkt in der Oberpfalz is twinned with:

- Issoire, France
- Mistelbach, Austria

== Notable people ==
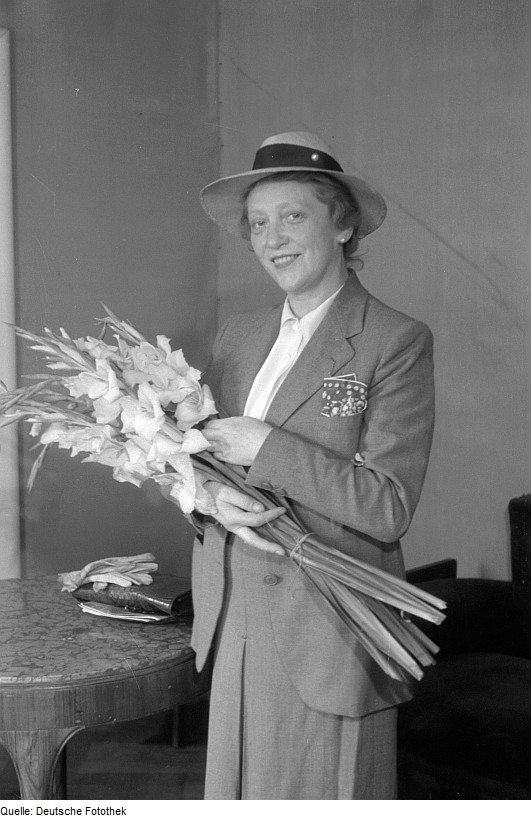
Käthe Dorsch in 1946

- Christopher of Bavaria (1416–1448), King of Denmark, Norway and Sweden
- Otto II, Count Palatine of Mosbach-Neumarkt (1425–1499), Pfalzgraf, bridesman at the Landshut Wedding, astronomer and mathematician
- Caspar Schoppe (1576–1649), publicist of the Counter-Reformation
- Martin Schrettinger (1772–1851), library scientist
- Dietrich Eckart (1868–1923), poet, playwright, journalist and political activist
- Max Feldbauer (1869–1948), painter
- Albert Reich (1881–1942), painter, graphic artist and illustrator
- August Rinaldi (1883–1962), film architect
- Michael Rackl (1883–1948), Bishop of Eichstätt
- Käthe Dorsch (1890–1957), actress
- Ludwig Ott (1906–1985), Catholic theology professor, dogmatist and mediavist
- Adolf Beck (1938–2009), politician (CSU), member of Landtag of Bavaria 1970–2003
- Alois Karl (born 1950), Lord Mayor of Neumarkt 1990–2005, since 2005 Bundestag deputy
- Karl-Heinz Radschinsky (born 1953), weight lifter
- Stefan Körner (born 1968), politician (Pirate Party Germany)

== See also ==
- Museum for Historical Maybach Vehicles
