= Berngau =

- Municipality
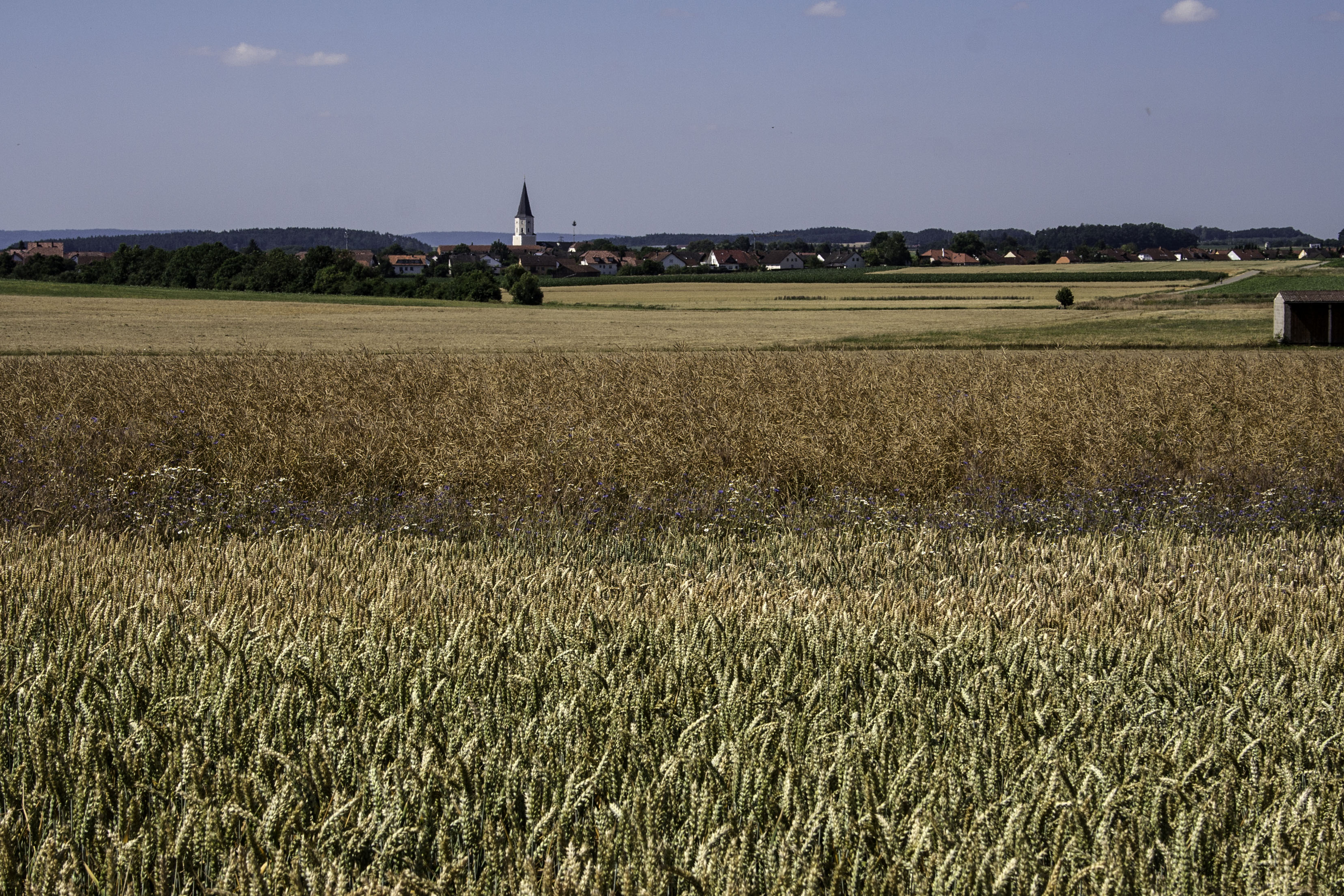
- Berngau

- Coat of arms

- Location of Berngau within Neumarkt in der Oberpfalz district
- Interactive map of Berngau
- Location within Germany Location within Bavaria
- Coordinates: 49°15′N 11°24′E
- Country: Germany
- State: Bavaria
- Admin. region: Oberpfalz
- District: Neumarkt in der Oberpfalz
- Municipal assoc.: Neumarkt in der Oberpfalz
- Subdivisions: 8 Ortsteile

Government
  - Mayor (2020–26): Thomas Meier

Area
  - Total: 27.14 km^{2} (10.48 sq mi)
- Elevation: 433 m (1,421 ft)

Population (2025-12-31)
  - Total: 2,636
  - Density: 97.13/km^{2} (251.6/sq mi)
- Time zone: UTC+01:00 (CET)
  - Summer (DST): UTC+02:00 (CEST)
- Postal codes: 92361
- Dialling codes: 09181
- Vehicle registration: NM
- Website: www.berngau.de

Berngau is a municipality in the district of Neumarkt in Bavaria in Germany.
