= Amberg (electoral district) =

Federal electoral district of Germany

231 Amberg
- Electoral district for the Bundestag
- Amberg in 2025
- State: Bavaria
- Population: 279,800 (2019)
- Electorate: 213,946 (2025)
- Major settlements: Amberg; Neumarkt in der Oberpfalz; Sulzbach-Rosenberg
- Area: 2,649.9 km^{2}

Current electoral district
- Created: 1949
- Party: CSU
- Member: Susanne Hierl
- Elected: 2021, 2025

Amberg is an electoral constituency (German: Wahlkreis) represented in the Bundestag. It elects one member via first-past-the-post voting. Under the current constituency numbering system, it is designated as constituency 231. It is located in central northern Bavaria, comprising the city of Amberg and the districts of Amberg-Sulzbach and Neumarkt.

Amberg was created for the inaugural 1949 federal election. Since 2021, it has been represented by Susanne Hierl of the Christian Social Union (CSU).

== Geography ==
Amberg is located in central northern Bavaria. As of the 2021 federal election, it comprises the independent city of Amberg and the districts of Amberg-Sulzbach and Neumarkt.

== History ==
Amberg was created in 1949. In the 1965 through 1972 elections, it was known as Amberg – Neumarkt. Since the 1976 election, it has again been named Amberg. In the 1949 election, it was Bavaria constituency 19 in the numbering system. In the 1953 through 1961 elections, it was number 214. In the 1965 through 1998 elections, it was number 218. In the 2002 and 2005 elections, it was number 233. In the 2009 through 2021 elections, it was number 232. From the 2025 election, it has been number 231.

Originally, the constituency comprised the independent cities of Amberg and Neumarkt in der Oberpfalz and the districts of Landkreis Amberg, Landkreis Neumarkt in der Oberpfalz, and Sulzbach-Rosenberg. From 1965 through 1972, it also contained the districts of Beilngries, Riedenburg, and Parsberg. It acquired its current borders in the 1976 election.

Election	No.	Name	Borders
1949	19	Amberg	Amberg city; Neumarkt in der Oberpfalz city; Landkreis Amberg district; Landkreis Neumarkt in der Oberpfalz district; Sulzbach-Rosenberg district
1953	214	Amberg	Amberg city; Neumarkt in der Oberpfalz city; Landkreis Amberg district; Landkreis Neumarkt in der Oberpfalz district; Sulzbach-Rosenberg district
1957	214	Amberg	Amberg city; Neumarkt in der Oberpfalz city; Landkreis Amberg district; Landkreis Neumarkt in der Oberpfalz district; Sulzbach-Rosenberg district
1961	214	Amberg	Amberg city; Neumarkt in der Oberpfalz city; Landkreis Amberg district; Landkreis Neumarkt in der Oberpfalz district; Sulzbach-Rosenberg district
1965	218	Amberg – Neumarkt	Amberg city; Neumarkt in der Oberpfalz city; Landkreis Amberg district; Landkreis Neumarkt in der Oberpfalz district; Sulzbach-Rosenberg district; Beilngries district; Riedenburg district; Parsberg district
1969	218	Amberg – Neumarkt	Amberg city; Neumarkt in der Oberpfalz city; Landkreis Amberg district; Landkreis Neumarkt in der Oberpfalz district; Sulzbach-Rosenberg district; Beilngries district; Riedenburg district; Parsberg district
1972	218	Amberg – Neumarkt	Amberg city; Neumarkt in der Oberpfalz city; Landkreis Amberg district; Landkreis Neumarkt in der Oberpfalz district; Sulzbach-Rosenberg district; Beilngries district; Riedenburg district; Parsberg district
1976	218	Amberg	Amberg city; Amberg-Sulzbach district; Neumarkt district
1980	218	Amberg	Amberg city; Amberg-Sulzbach district; Neumarkt district
1983	218	Amberg	Amberg city; Amberg-Sulzbach district; Neumarkt district
1987	218	Amberg	Amberg city; Amberg-Sulzbach district; Neumarkt district
1990	218	Amberg	Amberg city; Amberg-Sulzbach district; Neumarkt district
1994	218	Amberg	Amberg city; Amberg-Sulzbach district; Neumarkt district
1998	218	Amberg	Amberg city; Amberg-Sulzbach district; Neumarkt district
2002	233	Amberg	Amberg city; Amberg-Sulzbach district; Neumarkt district
2005	233	Amberg	Amberg city; Amberg-Sulzbach district; Neumarkt district
2009	232	Amberg	Amberg city; Amberg-Sulzbach district; Neumarkt district
2013	232	Amberg	Amberg city; Amberg-Sulzbach district; Neumarkt district
2017	232	Amberg	Amberg city; Amberg-Sulzbach district; Neumarkt district
2021	232	Amberg	Amberg city; Amberg-Sulzbach district; Neumarkt district
2025	231	Amberg	Amberg city; Amberg-Sulzbach district; Neumarkt district

== Members ==
The constituency has been held continuously by the Christian Social Union (CSU) since its creation. It was first represented by Josef Schatz from 1949 to 1953, followed by Anton Donhauser from 1953 to 1957. Heinrich Aigner then served from 1957 to 1980. Hermann Fellner was representative for three terms from 1980 to 1990. He was succeeded by Rudolf Kraus from 1990 to 2005. Alois Karl was elected in 2005 and served until 2021. He was succeeded by Susanne Hierl in 2021, who was re-elected in 2025.

Election	Member	Party	%
1949	Josef Schatz	CSU	33.5
1953	Anton Donhauser	CSU	64.5
1957	Heinrich Aigner	CSU	65.0
1961	Heinrich Aigner	CSU	64.1
1965	Heinrich Aigner	CSU	67.8
1969	Heinrich Aigner	CSU	66.6
1972	Heinrich Aigner	CSU	65.2
1976	Heinrich Aigner	CSU	66.9
1980	Hermann Fellner	CSU	64.4
1983	Hermann Fellner	CSU	68.3
1987	Hermann Fellner	CSU	62.7
1990	Rudolf Kraus	CSU	58.4
1994	Rudolf Kraus	CSU	56.6
1998	Rudolf Kraus	CSU	52.6
2002	Rudolf Kraus	CSU	60.4
2005	Alois Karl	CSU	58.8
2009	Alois Karl	CSU	47.3
2013	Alois Karl	CSU	58.4
2017	Alois Karl	CSU	47.7
2021	Susanne Hierl	CSU	40.3
2025	Susanne Hierl	CSU	44.5

== Election results ==
=== 2025 election ===
Federal election (2025): Amberg
Notes:	Blue background denotes the winner of the electorate vote. Pink background denotes a candidate elected from their party list. Yellow background denotes an electorate win by a list member, or other incumbent. A ✓ or ✗ denotes status of any incumbent, win or lose respectively.						
Party	Candidate	Votes	%	±%	Party votes	%	±%
CSU	✓ Susanne Hierl	80,626	44.5	▲4.2	72,724	40.1	▲5.0
AfD	Peter Boehringer	38,359	21.2	▲10.8	40,019	22.1	▲11.7
SPD	David Mandrella	19,705	10.9	▼5.1	19,333	10.7	▼7.6
FW	Hans Martin Grötsch	12,883	7.1	▼5.0	11,310	6.2	▼3.2
Greens	Peter Gerhard Gürtler	12,177	6.7	▼1.4	13,961	7.7	▼1.7
Left	Marco Winkler	7,316	4.0	▲1.6	7,977	4.4	▲2.0
FDP	Nils Jan Gründer	4,699	2.6	▼3.3	5,968	3.3	▼5.5
BSW					5,055	2.8	
APT					1,323	0.4	▼0.4
ÖDP	Susanne Maria Witt	1,746	1.0	▼0.9	795	0.4	▼0.3
dieBasis	Hans Josef Märkl	1,609	0.9	▼0.8	784	0.4	▼1.3
Volt	Markus Meier	1,403	0.8		810	0.4	▲0.3
PARTEI					580	0.3	▼0.3
BP					337	0.2	▼0.3
BD	Johannes Heinz Kotzbauer	610	0.3		212	0.1	
Humanists					107	0.1	Steady
MLPD					33	0.0	Steady
Informal votes		865			670		
Total valid votes		181,133			181,328		
Turnout		181,998	85.1	▲4.9			
CSU hold	Majority	42,267	23.3	▼1.0			

=== 2021 election ===
Federal election (2021): Amberg
Notes:	Blue background denotes the winner of the electorate vote. Pink background denotes a candidate elected from their party list. Yellow background denotes an electorate win by a list member, or other incumbent. A ✓ or ✗ denotes status of any incumbent, win or lose respectively.						
Party	Candidate	Votes	%	±%	Party votes	%	±%
CSU	Susanne Hierl	69,278	40.3	▼7.4	60,430	35.1	▼7.6
SPD	Johannes Foitzik	27,476	16.0	▲0.7	31,547	18.3	▲2.8
FW	Daisy Miranda	20,855	12.1	▲6.1	16,332	9.5	▲5.3
AfD	Peter Boehringer	17,822	10.4	▼0.8	17,958	10.4	▼2.4
Greens	Karl-Heinz Herbst	13,908	8.1	▲1.2	16,191	9.4	▲2.3
FDP	Nils Gründer (Note: Gründer entered the Bundestag on the FDP list after the resignation of Thomas Sattelberger in August 2022.)	10,213	5.9	▲0.9	15,067	8.7	▲1.1
Left	Markus Sendelbeck	4,158	2.4	▼2.0	4,095	2.4	▼2.9
ÖDP	Susanne Witt	3,247	1.9	▲0.2	1,298	0.8	▼0.3
dieBasis	Alwin Baumert	2,902	1.7		2,917	1.7	
Independent	Nikolaus Gradl	2,138	1.2				
Tierschutzpartei					1,938	1.1	▲0.2
PARTEI					991	0.6	0.0
BP					872	0.5	▼0.4
Pirates					755	0.4	▲0.2
Unabhängige					438	0.3	
Volt					275	0.2	
Team Todenhöfer					253	0.1	
Gesundheitsforschung					221	0.1	0.0
NPD					166	0.1	▼0.3
V-Partei3					128	0.1	▼0.1
Humanists					121	0.1	
Bündnis C					101	0.1	
The III. Path					98	0.1	
du.					89	0.1	
DKP					31	0.0	0.0
LKR					26	0.0	
MLPD					20	0.0	0.0
Informal votes		1,300			939		
Total valid votes		171,997			172,358		
Turnout		173,297	80.2	▲1.7			
CSU hold	Majority	41,802	24.3	▼8.2			

=== 2017 election ===
Federal election (2017): Amberg
Notes:	Blue background denotes the winner of the electorate vote. Pink background denotes a candidate elected from their party list. Yellow background denotes an electorate win by a list member, or other incumbent. A ✓ or ✗ denotes status of any incumbent, win or lose respectively.						
Party	Candidate	Votes	%	±%	Party votes	%	±%
CSU	✓ Alois Karl	80,075	47.7	▼10.7	71,720	42.6	▼10.8
SPD	Johannes Foitzik	25,580	15.2	▼5.7	26,080	15.5	▼3.9
AfD	Peter Boehringer	18,790	11.2		21,550	12.8	▲9.3
Greens	Yvonne Rösel	11,612	6.9	▲2.0	11,997	7.1	▲1.1
FW	Manuel Werthner	10,184	6.1	▲2.2	7,103	4.2	▲0.4
FDP	Moritz Pöllath	8,388	5.0	▲2.9	12,854	7.6	▲3.9
Left	Dominic Lenz	7,461	4.4	▲1.2	8,948	5.3	▲1.9
ÖDP	Norbert Peter	2,851	1.7	▼0.9	1,747	1.0	▼0.3
Tierschutzpartei					1,536	0.9	▲0.3
BP	Michael Prensky	1,835	1.1		1,450	0.9	▼0.1
Independent	Elmar Richard Widder	1,074	0.6				
PARTEI					928	0.6	
NPD					666	0.4	▼0.7
Pirates					475	0.3	▼1.7
DM					242	0.1	
V-Partei³					229	0.1	
Gesundheitsforschung					222	0.1	
BGE					187	0.1	
DiB					184	0.1	
MLPD					48	0.0	0.0
DKP					21	0.0	
BüSo					18	0.0	0.0
Informal votes		1,657			1,302		
Total valid votes		167,850			168,205		
Turnout		169,507	78.5	▲8.3			
CSU hold	Majority	54,495	32.5	▼5.0			

=== 2013 election ===
Federal election (2013): Amberg
Notes:	Blue background denotes the winner of the electorate vote. Pink background denotes a candidate elected from their party list. Yellow background denotes an electorate win by a list member, or other incumbent. A ✓ or ✗ denotes status of any incumbent, win or lose respectively.						
Party	Candidate	Votes	%	±%	Party votes	%	±%
CSU	✓ Alois Karl	87,248	58.4	▲11.0	80,073	53.5	▲8.3
SPD	Brigitte Bachmann	31,253	20.9	▼0.6	29,036	19.4	▲2.5
Greens	Stefan Schmidt	7,365	4.9	▼4.3	8,997	6.0	▼2.4
FW	Matthias Penkala	5,722	3.8		5,681	3.8	
Left	Wolfgang Berndt	4,909	3.3	▼3.7	5,052	3.4	▼3.6
ÖDP	Klaus Karl Peter	3,824	2.6		1,959	1.3	▼0.1
Pirates	Stefan Körner	3,781	2.5		2,920	2.0	▼0.5
FDP	Moritz Pöllath	3,148	2.1	▼10.5	5,633	3.8	▼9.0
AfD					5,273	3.5	
NPD	Heidrich Klenhart	2,229	1.5	▼1.0	1,586	1.1	▼0.8
BP					1,375	0.9	▲0.2
Tierschutzpartei					981	0.7	0.0
REP					372	0.2	▼0.4
DIE FRAUEN					280	0.2	
Party of Reason					152	0.1	
DIE VIOLETTEN					142	0.1	0.0
PRO					109	0.1	
RRP					53	0.0	▼0.8
MLPD					32	0.0	0.0
BüSo					30	0.0	▼0.1
Informal votes		1,542			1,285		
Total valid votes		149,479			149,736		
Turnout		151,021	70.2	▼1.4			
CSU hold	Majority	55,995	37.5	▲10.5			

=== 2009 election ===
Federal election (2009): Amberg
Notes:	Blue background denotes the winner of the electorate vote. Pink background denotes a candidate elected from their party list. Yellow background denotes an electorate win by a list member, or other incumbent. A ✓ or ✗ denotes status of any incumbent, win or lose respectively.						
Party	Candidate	Votes	%	±%	Party votes	%	±%
CSU	✓ Alois Karl	71,148	47.3	▼11.5	68,586	45.1	▼7.4
SPD	Christian Beyer	30,587	20.3	▼4.9	25,606	16.8	▼9.2
FDP	Edgar Meixner	18,922	12.6	▲8.2	19,418	12.8	▲5.3
Greens	Jörg Schümann	13,833	9.2	▲4.2	12,807	8.4	▲3.1
Left	Wolfgang Berndt	10,544	7.0	▲3.9	10,629	7.0	▲3.5
Pirates					3,686	2.4	
NPD	Heidrich Klenhart	3,818	2.5	▲0.3	2,839	1.9	▼0.1
ÖDP					2,083	1.4	
RRP	Peter Hans Riedl	1,493	1.0		1,288	0.8	
FAMILIE					1,284	0.8	0.0
BP					1,026	0.8	▼0.1
Tierschutzpartei					965	0.6	
REP					913	0.6	▼0.1
PBC					234	0.2	▼0.1
DIE VIOLETTEN					213	0.1	
CM					198	0.1	
DVU					105	0.1	
BüSo					62	0.0	0.0
MLPD					37	0.0	0.0
Informal votes		3,314			1,680		
Total valid votes		150,345			151,979		
Turnout		153,659	71.6	▼6.5			
CSU hold	Majority	40,561	27.0	▼6.6			

=== 2005 election ===
Federal election (2005):Amberg
Notes:	Blue background denotes the winner of the electorate vote. Pink background denotes a candidate elected from their party list. Yellow background denotes an electorate win by a list member, or other incumbent. A ✓ or ✗ denotes status of any incumbent, win or lose respectively.						
Party	Candidate	Votes	%	±%	Party votes	%	±%
CSU	Alois Karl	96,174	58.8	▼1.6	86,155	52.5	▼11.0
SPD	Christian Beyer	41,223	25.2	▼3.4	42,738	26.1	▲0.3
Greens	Roland Schlusche	8,094	5.0	▲0.4	8,714	5.3	▲0.6
FDP	Günter Koch	7,146	4.4	▲0.5	12,185	7.4	▲3.9
Left	Wolfgang Berndt	5,110	3.1	▲2.4	5,746	3.5	▲3.0
NPD	Heidrich Klenhart	3,617	2.2		3,271	2.0	▲1.8
BP	Lothar Sinnesbichler	2,093	1.3	▲0.6	1,254	0.8	▲0.6
Familie					1,309	0.8	
REP					1,112	0.7	▲0.2
Feminist					464	0.3	▲0.2
PBC					443	0.3	▲0.1
GRAUEN					435	0.3	▲0.2
BüSo					113	0.1	▲0.1
MLPD					58	0.0	
Informal votes		2,981			2,441		
Total valid votes		163,457			163,997		
Turnout		166,438	78.1	▼4.4			
CSU hold	Majority	54,951	33.6				
