= Kolping Society =

Charitable organization

Kolpingwerk logo

The Kolping Society is an international organization founded in Cologne, Germany in 1850 during the Industrial Revolution, by Adolph Kolping, a diocesan priest, as a Catholic association to help young journeymen with job training, education and housing. Branches quickly developed in German-speaking communities. In the late nineteenth and early twentieth century local chapters tended to focus on helping German immigrants become acclimated to their new surroundings. As of 2021 there were local societies in over thirty countries. More recently its outreach has been to immigrants of various ethnicities and self-help programs in developing countries, where it aims to train skilled workers to help create a middle class.

In keeping with Kolping's program of providing reasonable, clean and decent surroundings for young people away from home, many Kolping Societies offer affordable accommodations to students, interns and other visitors.

== History ==
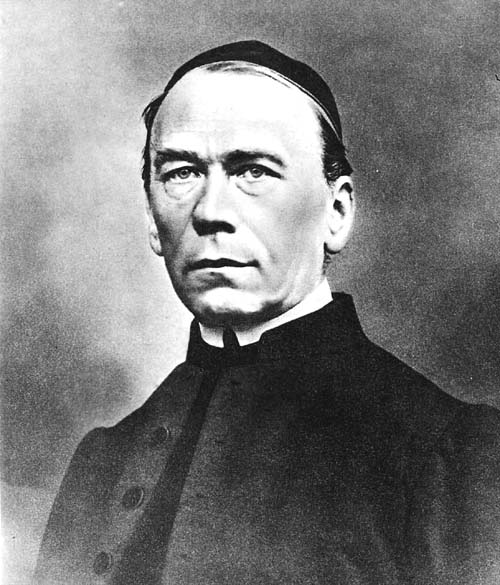
Adolph Kolping

Adolph Kolping was born in 1813 in Kerpen, the son of a poor shepherd. Although a good student, he could not afford to continue his education and in 1831 he became an apprentice to a shoemaker in Cologne. As a poor young workman, he became acquainted with the disadvantages suffered by men of his class on their journeys, in factories, and in city lodging-houses, and it influenced his decision to become a Catholic priest. Lacking the necessary education, he continued to work as a shoemaker. In 1834, at the age of twenty-three, he entered secondary school. In 1841 he gave up shoemaking to begin theological studies at the Ludwig-Maximilians-Universität München. After further studies at the University of Bonn and the University of Cologne, Kolping was ordained on 13 April 1845 at the Minoritenkirche in Cologne.

=== Gesellenvereine ===
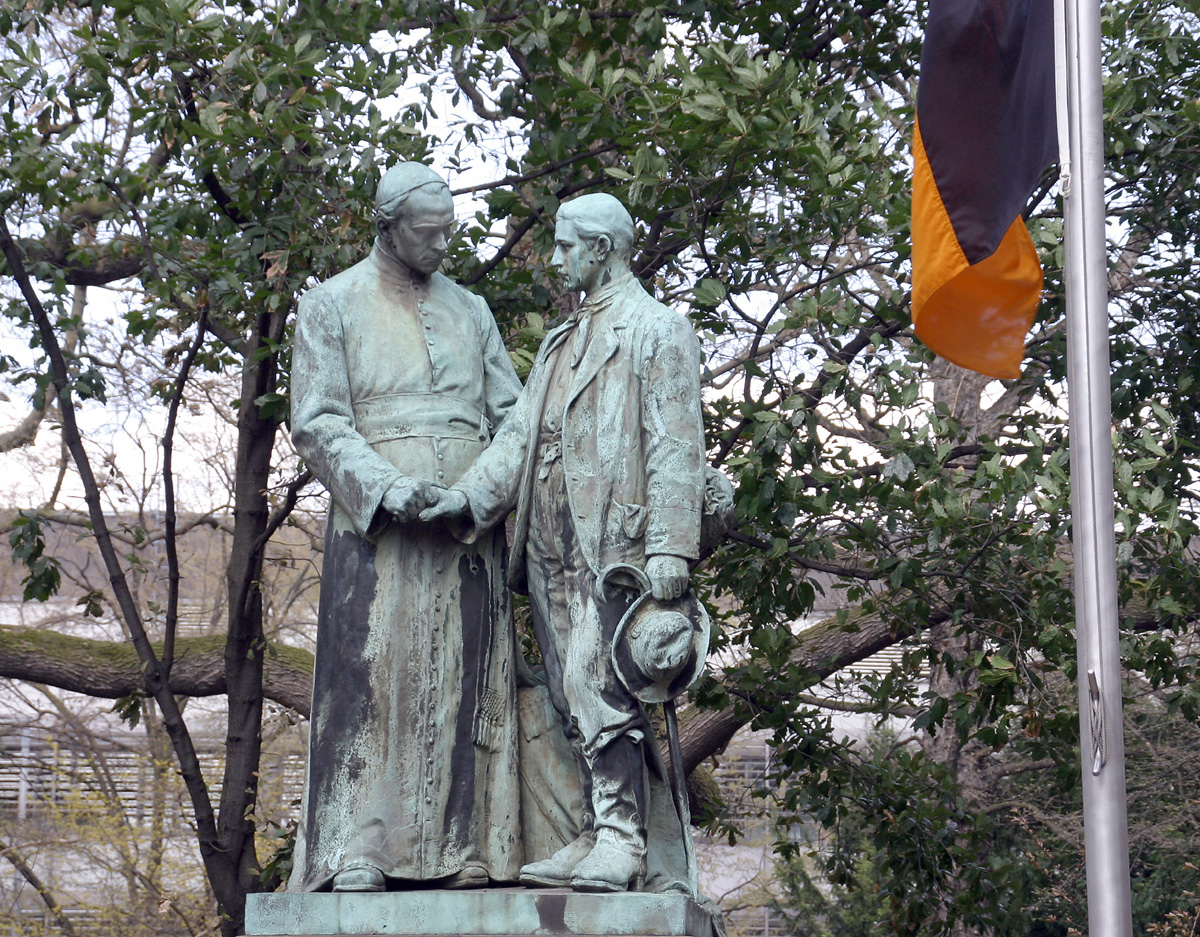
Adolph Kolping monument, Cologne

Kolping's first assignment was as a chaplain and religious education teacher in the textile-manufacturing city of Elberfeld. There a number of journeymen carpenters had founded a choral society with the aid of a teacher and the local clergy. It grew rapidly into the Gesellenvereine (Journeymen's Association), a young workmen's society with the acknowledged object of fostering the religious life of the members, and at the same time improving their mechanical skills. In 1847 Kolping became the president.

In 1849 Kolping was appointed vicar of the Cathedral Church of Saint Peter in Cologne. From his experience in Elberfeld, Kolping believed it advisable to establish a widespread organization of similar societies to produce a respectable body of master-workmen. "Initially, his objective was to provide a home-away-from-home for young apprentices and journeymen while they learned a trade that would enable them to make a decent and honest living." He established Cologne's branch of the Gesellenverein, which soon acquired its own home, and opened a hospice for young travelling journeymen. In his efforts to develop the work, Kolping was energetic and eloquent both as a speaker and writer. In 1850 he united the existing associations as the "Rheinischer Gesellenbund" – this fusion was the origin of the present international "Kolpingwerk".

He promoted the associations through the "Rheinische Volksblätter" (or the "Rhine Region People’s Paper"), a newspaper he founded in 1854, and which quickly became one of the most successful press organs of his time. In a short time societies of young Catholic journeymen were formed in many Rhenish towns, in Westphalia, and finally throughout the German-speaking world. By the time of his death in 1865, there were over 400 local groups of the journeymen's organization established throughout Europe and America. Kolping was beatified by the Catholic Church in 1991.

"While Kolping did not press for structural reform, he nevertheless sensitized the Roman Catholic Church to the problems of the working class and to the need for a commensurate social program."

=== Development ===
These societies aimed, in general, at the moral, mental, and professional improvement of young German Catholic journeymen, apprentices, etc. (Gesellen) by cultivating in them strong religious principles and civic virtue. This resulted in a large body of self-respecting and respected master-workmen, distributed over all parts of Germany and throughout the lands bordering the German Empire. Lectures were given on Sunday evenings by clergymen and laymen; the subjects ranging from religious topics to the purely instructive or entertaining. Non-religious festivities, such as excursions, theatricals, evening entertainments, and the like were also included. In 1890 attention began to be directed to the instruction of members in technical, industrial, and mercantile subjects. Besides providing for Christian doctrine, the societies conducted classes in book-keeping, arithmetic, drawing, literary composition, music, natural sciences, etc. In the larger cities, there were free classes in several crafts, e.g., for bakers, tailors, carpenters, workers in metal, painters, shoemakers. This instruction was designed especially for those workmen whose goal was to establish a business of their own. Frequently, in the large cities, these classes were attached to local technical and industrial schools, municipal or governmental.

In keeping with Father Kolping's program of providing reasonable, clean and decent surroundings for young people away from home, many Kolping Societies acquired buildings to provide safe, affordable housing for young workmen relocating for employment.

== Kolpingwerk ==
The Catholic Kolping Society has branches in over thirty countries. Each country has a National Office and is relatively independent in its operation. Local groups are known as Kolping Families. Individual chapters follow Kolping's dictum: "The needs of the times will tell you what to do." Mainly they offer educational and leisure activities to meet the needs of workers and their families.

The International Headquarters is located in Cologne across the street from the Minoritenkirche, where the founder is buried. Kolping International is represented at the United Nations Economic and Social Council (ECOSOC) in New York and at the International Labour Organization (ILO) in Geneva. The General Secretariat in Cologne coordinates, supports and monitors development projects in more than forty countries. Their work focuses on vocational education and training, microfinance programs, and access to clean drinking water.

=== United States ===
The Kolping Society in the United States operates thirteen facilities; the national headquarters is located in the Yorkville section of Manhattan, once a distinctly German neighborhood and still the site of the annual Steuben Day Parade. The first meeting of Kolping New York was held at the Church of St. Mary Magdalen, East 17th Street on October 14, 1888. "Its purpose was to provide a Kolping Society for young journeyman who arrived from Europe without friends or family." It subsequently acquired Kolping House, a short-term men's residence on 88th Street on the Upper East Side of Manhattan. As of 2021 Kolping New York also operates: the Kolping-on-Concourse residence for mature men and women. It is located on the Grand Concourse in the Bronx. This branch is affiliated with Catholic Charities of the Archdiocese of New York.

In the United States, the Society's activities are directed more toward families rather than providing residences for single people. The Kolping Society of Detroit was founded in 1926. In 1929. the society acquired a parcel of abandoned farmland and created Kolping Park which included a neo-Gothic chapel constructed from stones and shells sent from Kolping societies around the world. The chapel is listed on the National Register of Historic Places. The chapel was subsequently donated to the Chesterfield Township Historical Society and relocated to the Chesterfield Historical Village.

=== Canada ===
The Kolping Society of Canada has branches in Edmonton, Hamilton, Kelowna, Toronto, Vancouver and Winnipeg. Many of these organizations were founded in German parishes to assist young European immigrants find work and housing. It sought to maintain group cohesion through social activities. The Kolping Society of Ontario aided Catholic German tradesmen such as stonemasons and welders. Initially a men's organization, Kolping evolved into a family association.

=== Africa ===
The Kolping Society of South Africa (KSA) was established in Johannesburg by German immigrants in 1952. KSA supports four early-childhood development centres in South Africa, and runs an employment opportunity program providing vocational skills training for youth from marginalised and disadvantaged areas.

Since 2017 Kolping America, in conjunction with Kolping Kenya, has participated in a Small Animals Initiative/Dairy Goats Project, providing dairy goats to families. Since then most of the goats have given birth, increasing the number supplying goat milk and manure to grow vegetables.

=== India ===
Kolping established a presence in India in 1962; the National Kolping Society of India was formed about twenty years later. With support from Kolping Augsburg it runs nine children's after-school programs in Bangalore and Udhagamandalam. It also provided emergency assistance to migrant workers and pavement dwellers during the COVID-19 lockdown, to persons affected by Cyclone Nivar, and to the homeless facing a cold winter.

=== Lithuania ===
With the re-establishment of Lithuanian independence in 1990, pre-war Catholic societies were revived. The Lithuanian Kolping Society was established in 1993 as a public non-profit, charitable organization involved in educational activity. It runs Kolping College in Kaunas, a private non-university higher education institution, granting Professional bachelor's degrees; and Kolping Educational Centre to assist individuals with professional qualification and re-qualification.
