= Minoritenkirche =

Minoritenkirche (German - Church of the Friars Minor) may refer to:

- Minoritenkirche, Cologne
- Minoritenkirche (Vienna)
