= Susanne Hierl =

German politician and Bundestag (parliament) member

Susanne Hierl MdB

Member of the Bundestag; for Amberg
- Incumbent
- Assumed office 26 October 2021
- Preceded by: Alois Karl

Personal details
- Born: 29 September 1973 (age 52) Eichstätt, West Germany
- Party: Christian Social Union
- Children: 2
- Education: University of Regensburg

Susanne Hierl (born 29 September 1973) is a German lawyer and politician of the Christian Social Union (CSU) who has been serving as a member of the Bundestag since the 2021 elections, representing the Amberg constituency.

== Early life and education ==
Hierl was born in Eichstätt in 1973 and grew up in Postbauer-Heng. After graduating from the Ostendorfer-Gymnasium in 1992, she studied law at the University of Regensburg. She graduated in 1996 with her first state law examination.

== Early career ==
From 1997 to 1999, Hierl did her legal clerkship in Nuremberg and San Francisco. In 1999 she received her second state law exam. Since 2000, she has been working as a lawyer at Rödl & Partner. Since 2016, she has been a specialist lawyer for tax law. In 2004, she moved to Berg with her family

== Political career ==
=== Career in state politics ===
Hierl joined the CSU in 2007 and is also a member of the Women's Union. Since 2008, she has been a councillor in the municipality of Berg. In the 2008 state elections in Bavaria, she was a list candidate for the CSU. From 2009 to 2019, she was deputy district chairwoman of the CSU Neumarkt. Since 2009, she has been an assessor on the district executive committee of the CSU District Association of Upper Palatinate. In the 2013 state elections in Bavaria, she was again a list candidate for her party. From 2014 to 2020, she was deputy mayor of the municipality of Berg. Since 2014, she has been a district councillor in the district of Neumarkt.

=== Member of the Bundestag ===
In the 2021 federal election, she won the direct mandate in the Bundestag constituency of Amberg with 40.3% of the first votes and thus entered the 20th German Bundestag. In addition, she was on the list position 20 of her party. She is a full member of the Legal Affairs Committee of the German Bundestag. In addition, Hierl is a deputy member of the Finance Committee and the Committee on Economic Cooperation and Development of the German Bundestag. Since 27 January 2022, she has been deputy chairwoman of the CSU state group in the German Bundestag.

In parliament, Hierl has been serving on the Committee on European Law. Since 2022, she has been part of a study commission set up to investigate the entire period of German involvement in Afghanistan from 2001 to 2021 and to draw lessons for foreign and security policy in future.

In the negotiations to form a Grand Coalition under the leadership of Friedrich Merz's Christian Democrats (CDU together with the CSU) and the Social Democrats (SPD) following the 2025 German elections, Hierl led the CSU delegation in the working group on families, women, youth, senior and democracy; her counterparts from the other parties were Silvia Breher and Serpil Midyatli.

== Other activities ==
Hierl is a member of the Berg Volunteer Fire Department, the Berg Fruit and Horticulture Association, the DJK Berg, Kolping Berg and the Catholic German Women's Association. Since 2022 she is Member of the Advisory Board of the Tarabya Cultural Academy Board

== Personal life ==
Hierl is married and the mother of two children.
