= Carsten Träger =

German politician (1973–2026)

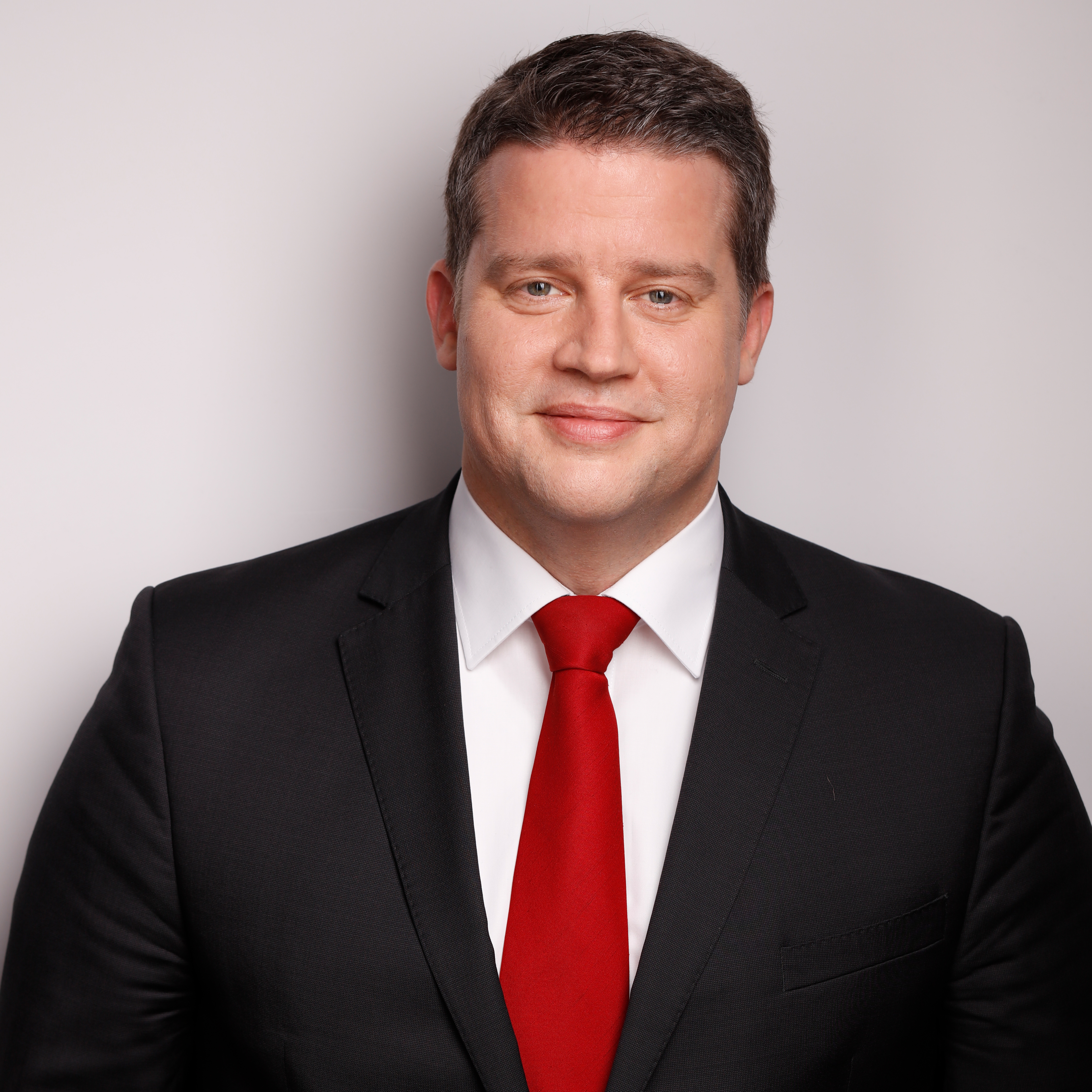
- Träger in 2017

Member of the Bundestag for Bavaria
- In office 2013 – 21 March 2026
- Succeeded by: David Mandrella

Personal details
- Born: 25 October 1973 Fürth, Bavaria, West Germany
- Died: 21 March 2026 (aged 52) Innsbruck, Tyrol, Austria
- Party: SPD
- Children: 2

Carsten Träger (25 October 1973 – 21 March 2026) was a German politician of the Social Democratic Party (SPD) who served as a member of the Bundestag from the state of Bavaria from 2013 until his death in 2026.

In addition to his work in parliament, Träger served as Parliamentary State Secretary at the Federal Ministry for the Environment, Nature Conservation, Climate Protection and Nuclear Safety in the government of Chancellor Friedrich Merz from 2025.

== Political career ==
Träger first became a member of the Bundestag in the 2013 German federal election. He was a member of the Committee on Food and Agriculture and the Committee on the Environment, Nature Conservation and Nuclear Safety. From 2018, he was his parliamentary group's spokesperson on environmental policy.

In addition to his committee assignments, Träger was a member of the German delegation to the Franco-German Parliamentary Assembly from 2019. From 2022, he was one of the founding members of a cross-party group promoting a One Health approach.

In the negotiations to form a coalition government under the leadership of Chancellor Angela Merkel following the 2017 federal elections, Träger was part of the working group on energy, climate protection and the environment, led by Armin Laschet, Georg Nüßlein and Barbara Hendricks.

In the negotiations to form a so-called traffic light coalition of the SPD, the Green Party and the Free Democratic Party (FDP) following the 2021 federal elections, Träger was part of his party's delegation in the working group on environmental policy, co-chaired by Rita Schwarzelühr-Sutter, Steffi Lemke and Stefan Birkner.

Within the SPD parliamentary group, Träger and Carolin Wagner led the Bundestag group of SPD parliamentarians from Bavaria from 2023.

== Other activities ==
- German Foundation for Consumer Protection (DSV), Member of the Board of Trustees (from 2022)
- Nuclear Waste Disposal Fund (KENFO), Member of the Board of Trustees (from 2022)
- German Federal Environmental Foundation (DBU), Member of the Board of Trustees (from 2019)
- International Academy for Nature Conservation (INA), Member of the Advisory Board

== Death ==
Träger collapsed on 21 March 2026, at the age of 52, while he was skiing near Innsbruck, Austria, and died in a hospital.

He is survived by his wife and two daughters.
