= David Mandrella =

German politician (born 2001)

- David Mandrella in 2024

Member of the Bundestag for Bavaria
- Incumbent
- Assumed office 30 March 2026
- Preceded by: Carsten Träger

Personal details
- Born: 12 April 2001 (age 25) Amberg, West Germany
- Party: SPD

David Tobias Mandrella (born 12 April 2001 in Amberg) is a German politician from the Social Democratic Party (SPD). He has been a member of the German Bundestag since March 2026.

== Early life ==
Mandrella says he grew up in a working-class family as the child of Polish immigrants. After graduating from the Gregor-Mendel-Gymnasium Amberg he studied at the Friedrich-Alexander-Universität Erlangen-Nürnberg and works as a teacher. He is also active in the trade union movement and is a member of the IG Metall Jugend. Mandrella is Roman Catholic and lives in Kümmersbruck.

== Political career ==
Mandrella is a member of the SPD. He was district chairman of the Young Socialists (Jusos) in the Upper Palatinate and previously belonged to the state executive committee of the Young Socialists in Bavaria, where he was responsible for education policy. He is a member of the state executive committee of the SPD Bavaria and an assessor on the district executive committee of the SPD in the Upper Palatinate.

In the 2025 German federal election, he ran in the Amberg constituency and was 15th on the Bavarian SPD state list. He received 10.9% of the first-preference votes, so he did not initially win a seat in the Bundestag. His candidacy was supported by Brand New Bundestag. Mandrella took his seat in the Bundestag on 30 March 2026, replacing the deceased Carsten Träger.
