= Anton Donhauser =

German politician (1913–1987)

Member of the Bundestag; from Bavaria
- In office 7 September 1949 – 15 October 1957
- Preceded by: Constituency established
- Succeeded by: Heinrich Aigner
- Constituency: State list (1949–1953); Amberg (1953–1957)

Personal details
- Born: 19 September 1913 Munich, Germany
- Died: 10 February 1987 (aged 73) Munich, West Germany
- Party: Christian Social Union
- Children: 4
- Education: Technical University of Danzig

Anton Donhauser (19 September 1913 – 10 February 1987) was a German politician, representative of the Christian Social Union in Bavaria.

== See also ==
- List of Bavarian Christian Social Union politicians
