= Nils Gründer =

German politician (born 1997)

Nils Gründer MdB

Member of the Bundestag for Bavaria
- In office 2 August 2022 – 2025
- Preceded by: Thomas Sattelberger

Personal details
- Born: 23 May 1997 (age 29) Nuremberg, Germany
- Party: Free Democratic Party
- Education: University of Göttingen
- Occupation: Politician

Nils Jan Gründer (born 23 May 1997 in Nuremberg) is a German politician of the Free Democratic Party (FDP) who served as a member of the German Bundestag from 2022 to 2025.

== Early life ==
Gründer grew up in Pyrbaum and Neumarkt in der Oberpfalz, where he graduated from Ostendorfer-Gymnasium in 2016. He then studied political science before switching to economics at the University of Göttingen in 2020. Initially, Gründer worked as a student assistant to Lukas Köhler, and as an account manager at a PR agency during his studies.

== Political career ==
In 2015, Gründer joined the FDP Bavaria and the Young Liberals. In the 2018 state election in Bavaria, he was a direct candidate in the constituency of Neumarkt in der Oberpfalz but failed to make it into the state parliament. From 2018 to 2020, he was deputy state chairman for the programme of the Young Liberals of Bavaria.

In the 2021 German federal election, Gründer contested Amberg and ranked 15th on the state list and initially failed to make it into the Bundestag. He was the first successor on the FDP state list and therefore replaced Thomas Sattelberger in the Bundestag on 2 August 2022. There he is the youngest MP of his group.

In parliament, Gründer served on the Defence Committee, the Committee on the Environment, Nature Conservation, Nuclear Safety and Consumer Protection, and the Parliamentary Advisory Board for Sustainable Development.

In addition to his work in the Bundestag, Gründer is currently deputy district chairman of the FDP Neumarkt.

== See also ==
- List of members of the 20th Bundestag
