= Hermann Fellner =

German politician (1950–2020)

Member of the Bundestag; for Amberg
- In office 4 November 1980 – 20 December 1990
- Preceded by: Heinrich Aigner
- Succeeded by: Rudolf Kraus

Personal details
- Born: 20 December 1950 Hirschau, West Germany
- Died: 17 May 2020 (aged 69)
- Party: Christian Social Union
- Education: University of Regensburg

Hermann Fellner (20 December 1950 – 17 May 2020) was a German politician, representative of the Christian Social Union in Bavaria. He was a member of the Bundestag of Germany.

Fellner was in its youth chairman of the local federation of the Young Union Ehenfeld – Massenricht. During his studies he was active in the Ring Christlich-Demokratischer Studenten. In 1980, Fellner moved into the German Bundestag as the youngest member of parliament at the time as a direct representative of the Amberg constituency. He was a member of the German Bundestag until 1990. During this time, he held the office of domestic policy spokesman for the CSU state-group (Landesgruppe), among other things.

When asked in 1985, in connection with the sale of the Flick Group to Deutsche Bank, whether compensation should be paid to forced laborers during the Nazi era, Fellner said that he saw

no legal or moral basis for a Jewish claim. The impression was given that the Jews are quick to speak up when money is jingling somewhere in German coffers. Nor should the Jews embarrass us with such demands. The question arose as to what demands of this kind might still come; at the same time he demanded ... we must have peace sometime.

Later, Fellner recommended that Deutsche Bank pay compensation even without a legal obligation, and explained his statements, which had been criticized as antisemitic and for which he apologized to the Bundestag on 16 January 1986, after initial rejection, to the effect that he did not question compensation from a moral standpoint, but there was no legal basis for it.

== See also ==
- List of Bavarian Christian Social Union politicians
