= Alois Karl =

German lawyer & politician (born 1950)

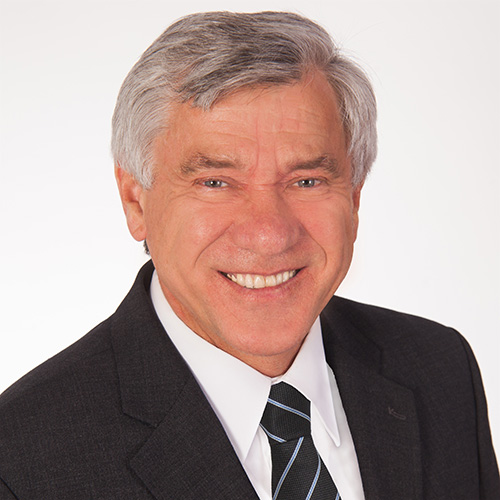
- Karl in 2017

Member of the Bundestag; for Amberg
- In office 18 October 2005 – 26 October 2021
- Preceded by: Rudolf Kraus
- Succeeded by: Susanne Hierl

Personal details
- Born: 22 November 1950 (age 75) Neumarkt in der Oberpfalz, West Germany
- Party: Christian Social Union
- Children: 2
- Education: University of Regensburg
- Website: http://www.alois-karl.de/

Alois Karl (born 22 November 1950) is a German lawyer and politician from the Christian Social Union of Bavaria who served as a member of the German Bundestag from 2005 until 2021, representing Amberg. He also was Mayor of Neumarkt in der Oberpfalz from 1990 to 2005.

== Political career ==
Karl was a member of the Budget Committee and its Sub-Committee on European Affairs from 2005 until 2021; in 2014, he became the sub-committee's deputy chairman. On the Budget Committee, he served as his parliamentary group's rapporteur on the annual budget of the Federal Foreign Office. In addition, Karl served as chairman of the Parliamentary Friendship Group for Relations with the Baltic States and as member of the German delegation to the Parliamentary Assembly of the Organization for Security and Co-operation in Europe (OSCE).

In the negotiations to form a coalition government following the 2009 federal elections, Karl was part of the CDU/CSU delegation in the working group on transport and building policies; led by Hans-Peter Friedrich and Patrick Döring.

In July 2020, Karl announced that he would not stand in the 2021 federal elections but instead resign from active politics by the end of the parliamentary term.

== Other activities ==
- KfW, Member of the Board of Supervisory Directors (until 2022)

== Political positions ==
In June 2017, Karl voted against Germany's introduction of same-sex marriage.
