= Munderkingen =

- Town
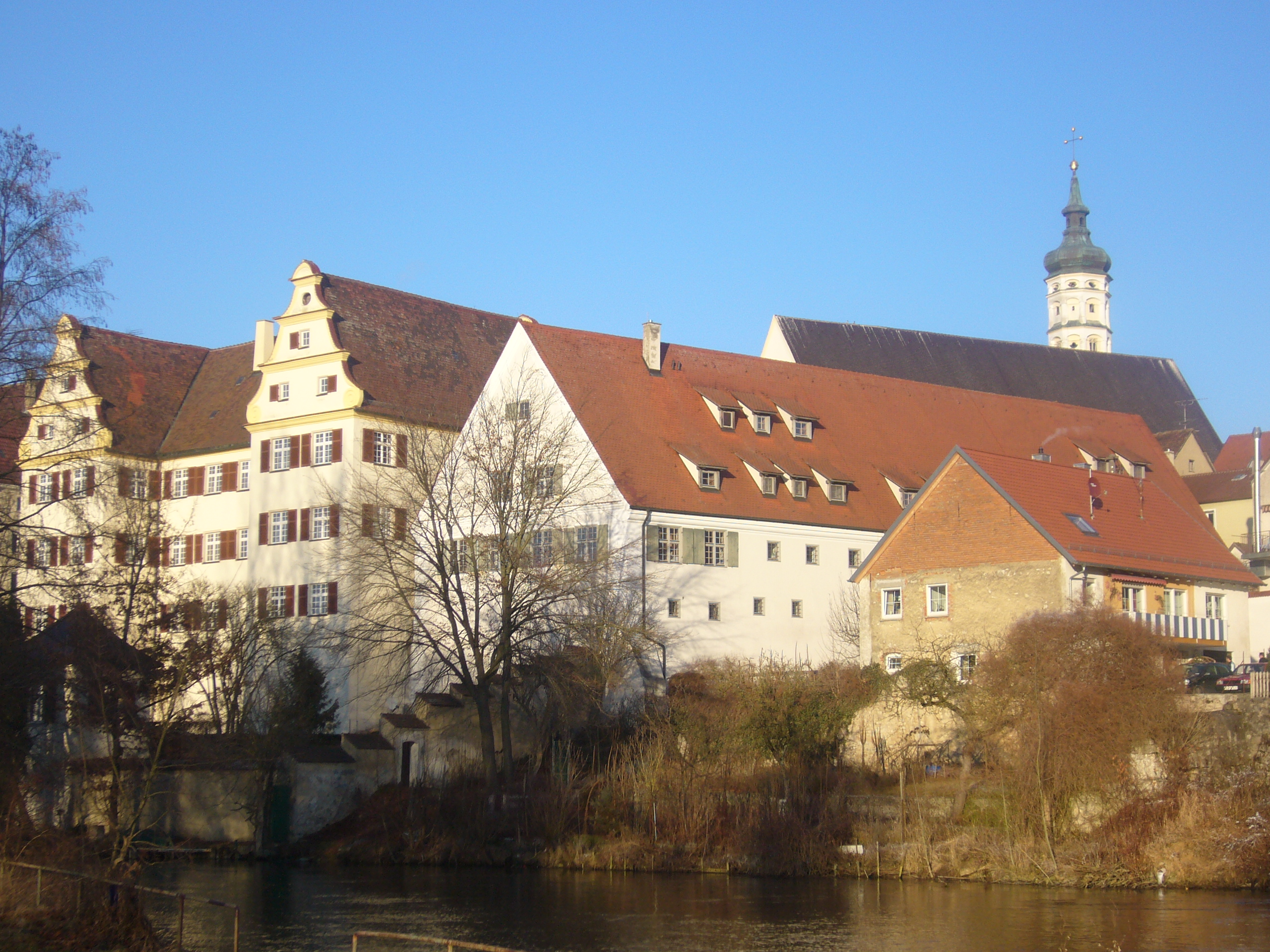
- Munderkingen on the Danube river

- Coat of arms

- Location of Munderkingen within Alb-Donau-Kreis district
- Interactive map of Munderkingen
- Location within Germany Location within Baden-Württemberg
- Coordinates: 48°14′7″N 9°38′38″E
- Country: Germany
- State: Baden-Württemberg
- Admin. region: Tübingen
- District: Alb-Donau-Kreis

Government
  - Mayor (2023–31): Thomas Schelkle

Area
  - Total: 13.08 km^{2} (5.05 sq mi)
- Elevation: 516 m (1,693 ft)

Population (2025-12-31)
  - Total: 5,447
  - Density: 416.4/km^{2} (1,079/sq mi)
- Time zone: UTC+01:00 (CET)
  - Summer (DST): UTC+02:00 (CEST)
- Postal codes: 89597
- Dialling codes: 07393
- Vehicle registration: UL
- Website: www.munderkingen.de

Munderkingen (German pronunciation: [ˈmʊndɐˌkɪŋən]; Swabian: Mondrkenga) is the smallest town in the district of Alb-Donau in Baden-Württemberg in Germany. It is situated on the Danube, 9 km southwest of Ehingen, and 31 km southwest of Ulm.

== Buildings ==
=== Danube Bridge ===
The so-called "New Danube Bridge" 1893 was the first massive concrete arch bridge, which was built with an arch span of more than 50 m: Engineer Karl Leibbrand from Stuttgart was the builder, the work was carried out by the construction company Buck from Ehingen. The bridge was busted in World War II, on April 22, 1945, by the retreating German engineering troops. Reconstruction began immediately after the war. In June 1948, the rebuilt Danube bridge was inaugurated by the occupying power of the French zone.

== Old hospital ==
Built in 1889–90, the historicist building belongs to the townscape.

== Transport ==
Munderkingen is served by the Ulm–Sigmaringen railway.

Munderkingen in Alb-Donau-district

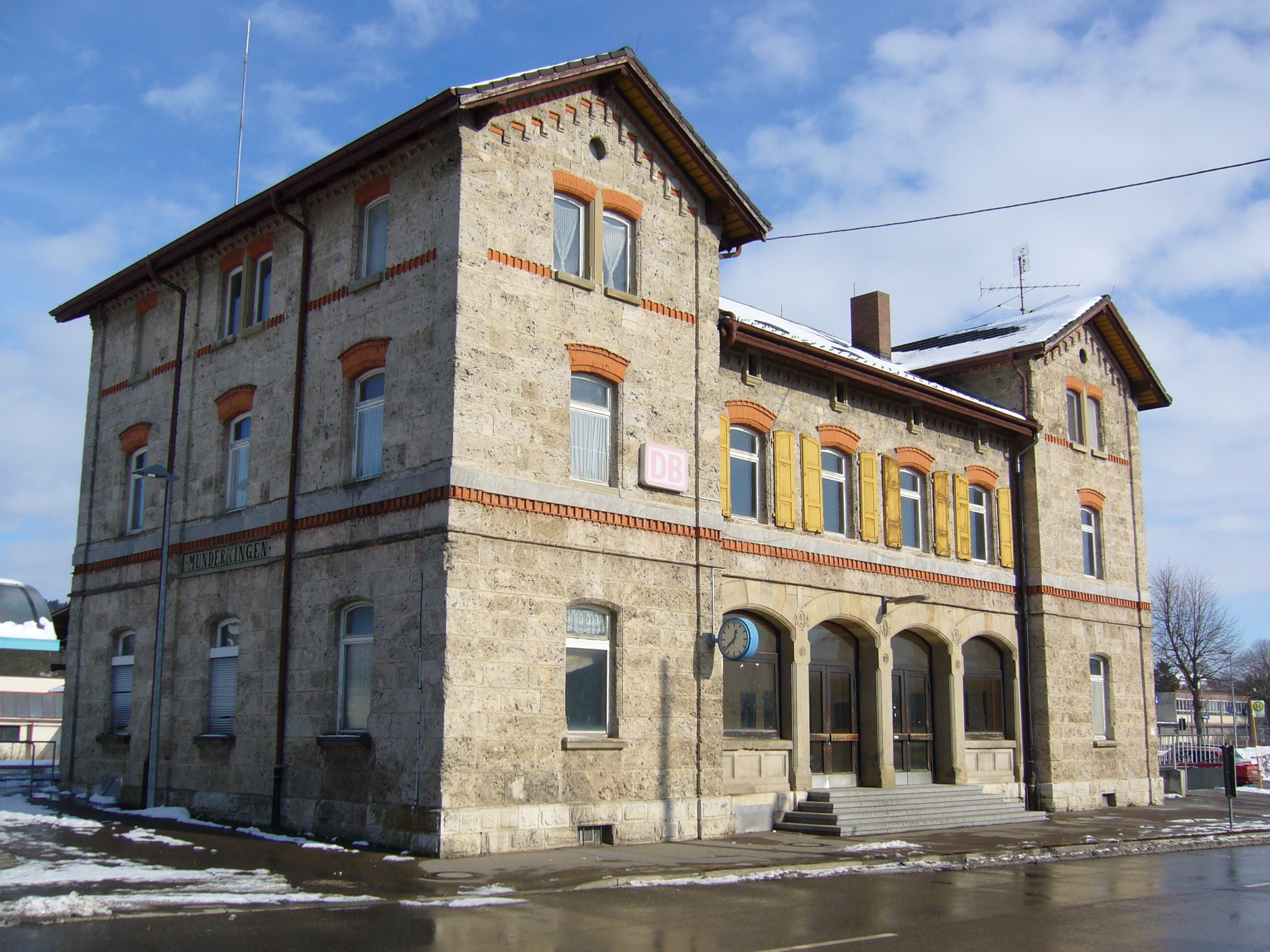
Munderkingen station, built 1870

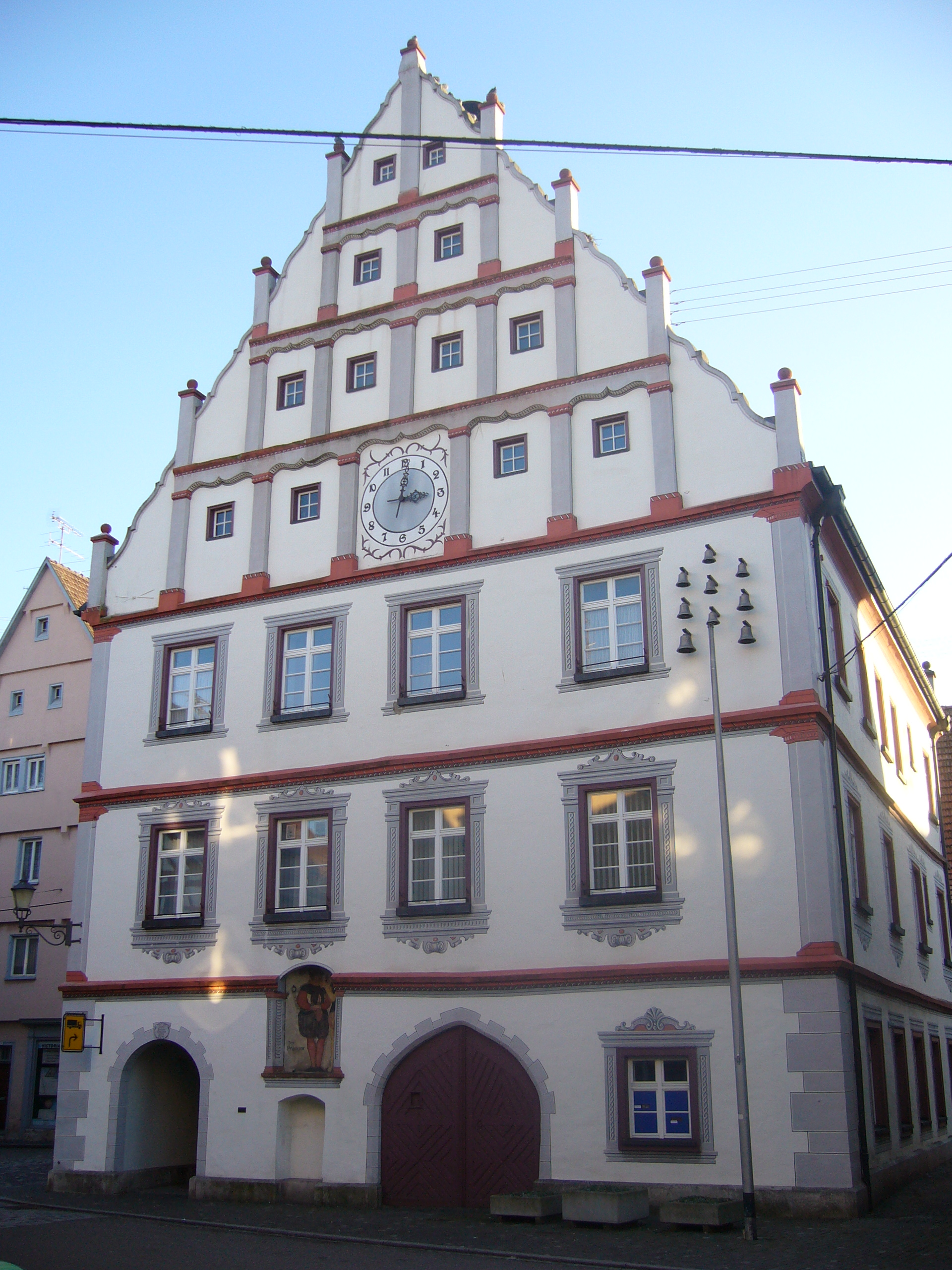
Munderkingen Town hall

== Daughters and sons of the town ==
- Thomas Sattelberger (born 1949), German manager and politician (FDP)
- Thomas Locher (born 1956), Concept artist, professor at the art college in Copenhagen, Denmark, professor and rector of the art college for graphics and book art in Leipzig
- Meinrad Kneer (born 1970), jazz musician
- Carl Borromäus Weitzmann, 1767 Munderkingen, died 1828 in Ehingen (Donau) was a lawyer with a degree from the University of Vienna. Freemason and member of two lodges (Vienna and Ulm). He is the best-known representative of Swabian poetry. In terms of the number of publishing editions of his poems from 1803 (first edition) to the present day, CBS is the most widely read "Swabian poet" of his time and to this day.
- Lorenz Locher (1903–1974), historian, music and poems for the Munderkinger Fasnacht (traditional fountain jump). Book editions: Fasnacht (1934), Carl Borromäus Weitzmann (1955), Conradus Kner Abbas Marchtalensis XII. (1960), Patre Sebastian Sailer priest in the (Ober-) Marchtal convent (1965)
- Karl Josef von Schmid (1832/1893), Politician, lawyer, mayor of Munderkingen, member of the state parliament and Reichstag, Minister of the Interior, Kingdom of Württemberg, ennobled by King Karl of Württemberg. Initiator of the expansion of the Danube Valley Railway (Ulm-Munderkingen-Sigmaringen, later including Donaueschingen-Freiburg). Construction of the Munderkingen hospital, railway and post office buildings and the architecturally new concrete single-arch Danube bridge (50m span) - completion 1893
