= Gesellenverein =

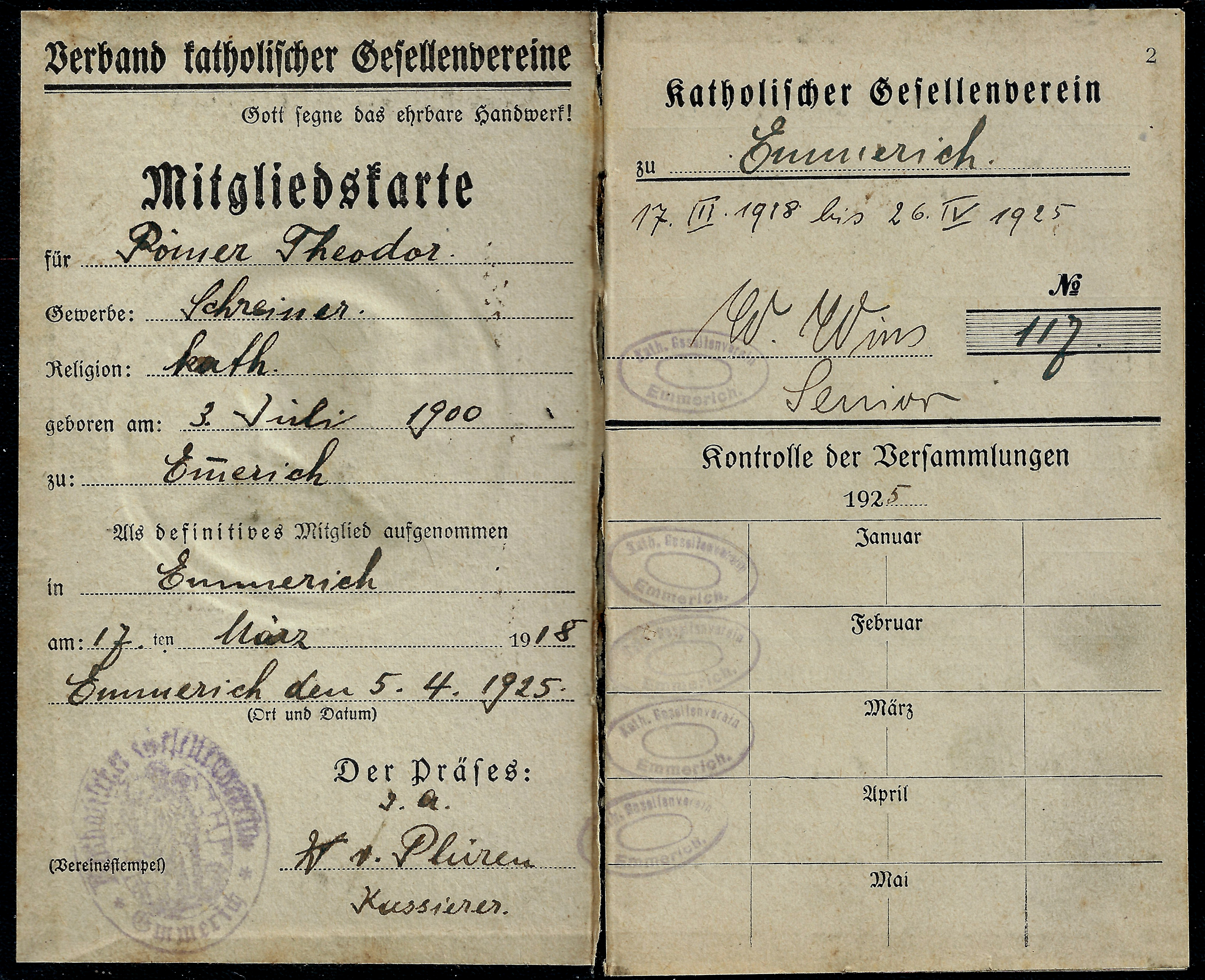
Member book of a "Gesellenverein", 1925

The Gesellenvereine (usual translation Journeymen's Unions) were German Roman Catholic societies set up in the nineteenth century. They were originated by Adolph Kolping, surnamed the Journeymen's Father (Gesellenvater). They had for aims the religious, moral, and professional improvement of young workers.

== Foundation ==
In 1849 Kolping was appointed assistant-priest at the Cologne Cathedral. With friends, ecclesiastics and laymen, he founded a Gesellenverein, and began free instruction through it. The Cologne society soon acquired its own home, and opened there a refuge, or hospice, for young travelling journeymen.

Kolping was energetic and eloquent both as speaker and writer. He visited frequently the great industrial centres of Germany, Austria, Switzerland, and Hungary. In a short time societies of young Catholic journeymen were formed in many Rhenish towns, in Westphalia, and finally throughout the German-speaking world.

== Movement ==
When Kolping died (4 December 1865), the Gesellenverein numbered about 400 branch unions. In 1901 they had reached the number of 1086, with a membership of 80,000 journeymen and 120,000 master-workmen. They existed in many other European countries, also.

Besides providing for Catholic doctrine, the societies conducted classes (book-keeping, arithmetic, drawing, literary composition, music, natural sciences, etc.) In the larger cities there were free classes in crafts. Instruction was designed especially for those workmen who aimed at establishing a business of their own. The principal publication was the Kolpingsblatt.
