= Heinrich Aigner =

German politician (1924–1988)

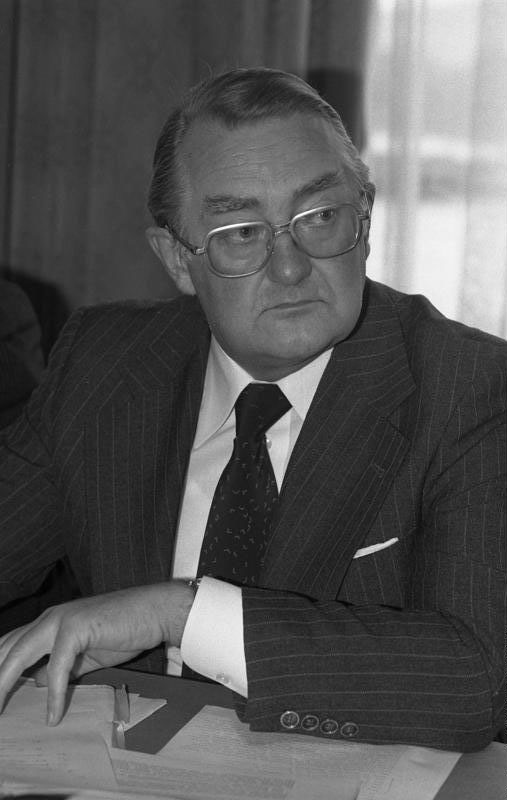
- Aigner in 1975

Member of the Bundestag
- In office 15 October 1957 – 4 November 1980
- Preceded by: Anton Donhauser
- Succeeded by: Hermann Fellner
- Constituency: Amberg (1957–1965); Amberg – Neumarkt (1965–1976); Amberg (1976–1980)

Personal details
- Born: 25 May 1924 Ebrach, Germany
- Died: 24 March 1988 (aged 63) Amberg, West Germany
- Party: Christian Social Union
- Education: University of Erlangen–Nuremberg

Heinrich Aigner (25 May 1924 – 24 March 1988) was a German politician, representative of the Christian Social Union in Bavaria. He was born in Ebrach and died in Amberg.

== See also ==
- List of Bavarian Christian Social Union politicians
