= Kolping Park and Chapel =

- U.S. National Register of Historic Places
- Michigan State Historic Site
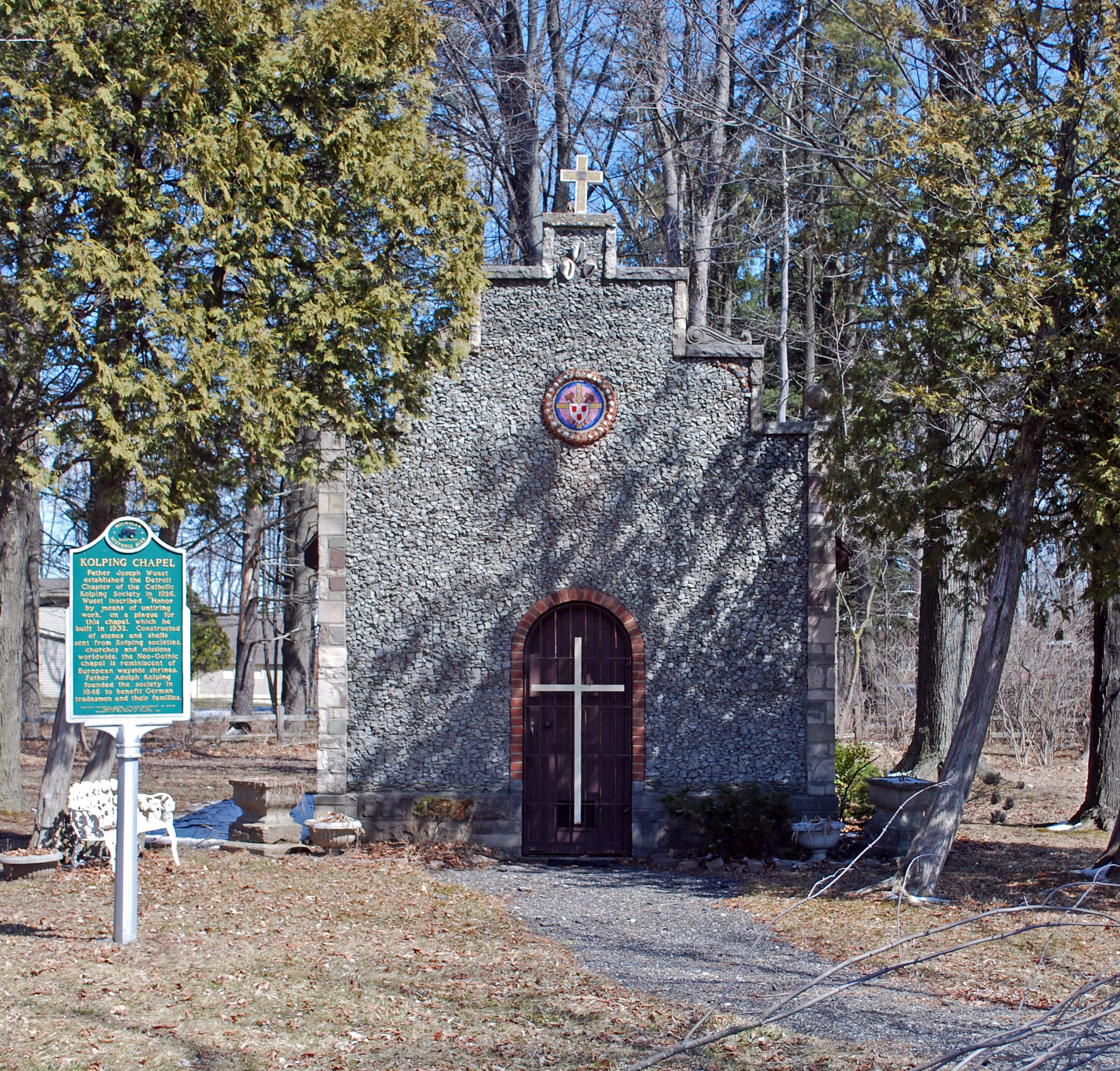

- Location within Michigan Location within the United States
- Interactive map
- Location: 47275 Sugarbush Rd. (park) and 47440 Sugarbush Rd. (chapel), Chesterfield Township, Michigan
- Coordinates: 42°39′0″N 82°49′16″W
- Built: 1932
- Architect: Rev. Father Joseph Wuest
- Architectural style: Gothic Revival
- NRHP reference No.: 96001417

Significant dates
- Added to NRHP: October 09, 1985
- Designated MSHS: February 29, 1996

The Kolping Park and Chapel is a religious facility previously located at 47440 Sugarbush Road in Chesterfield Township, Michigan. It was listed on the National Register of Historic Places and designated a Michigan State Historic Site in 1996. On September, 28th 2016 the chapel was moved to the Chesterfield Historical Village at 47275 Sugarbush Road.

== History ==
In 1849, Adolph Kolping founded a Catholic journeymen's association, the forerunner of what today is known as the Kolping Society. The society promotes member's development through education and activities. In 1926, Father Joseph Wuest, a former bricklayer, established a chapter of the society in Detroit. The local chapter acquired the land that is now Kolping Park in 1929. The society cleared the land, planted trees, and constructed some buildings. In 1932, Wuest designed and constructed the chapel on this site. The property is still owned by the Detroit branch of the Kolping Society of America.

The Kolping Society decided in 2015 to sell the park land and donated the Kolping Chapel to the Chesterfield Township Historical Society. On September 28, 2016, the chapel was moved from Kolping Park, down Sugarbush Road, to the Chesterfield Township Historical Village, where it presently sits.

== Rev. Father Joseph Wuest ==
Rev. Father Joseph Wuest was born in Nassau, Germany on July 7, 1869. He attended school in Thalheim, and studied further at Mesnières-en-Bray and at Langonnet, where he graduated in 1896. He was appointed a professor at Knechtsteden, where he served until 1899, when he emigrated to the United States to serve as an assistant pastor in Sharpsburg, Pennsylvania. Wuest served from 1902 to 1907 as a hospital chaplain, and in 1907, he was made pastor of St. Mary's church in Detroit. He immediately began working with immigrant German families, and in 1911 reached out to African American families, one of the first white church leaders to do so.

Wuest founded the local chapter of the Kolping Society in 1926, but ill-health forced him to retire as St. Mary's pastor in 1929, although he still heard confessions. Wuest died in July, 1958.

== Park and Chapel Description ==
Kolping Park is a 19-acre parcel, rectangular in shape, running from Sugarbush Road to the Vase River. The park contains Kolping's historic wayside chapel, as well as a shrine to Blessed Father Adolph Kolping, and a pavilion, dance hall, rifle range, picnic shelter, parade grounds, playground, soccer field and parking lot on landscaped grounds.

The chapel is a Gothic Revival structure, designed and constructed by Joseph Wuest himself. It is intended to be reminiscent of European wayside chapels. It is constructed from stones and shells sent to Wuest by Kolping societies from all over the world. Wuest inscribed a plaque with "Honor by means of untiring work" in the chapel.

The landscaping of the grounds as well as several of the structures were designed by Kolping Society members, including Vincent Schultes, Joseph Schultes, Wendel Schultes and Frank Foster.

== Gallery ==
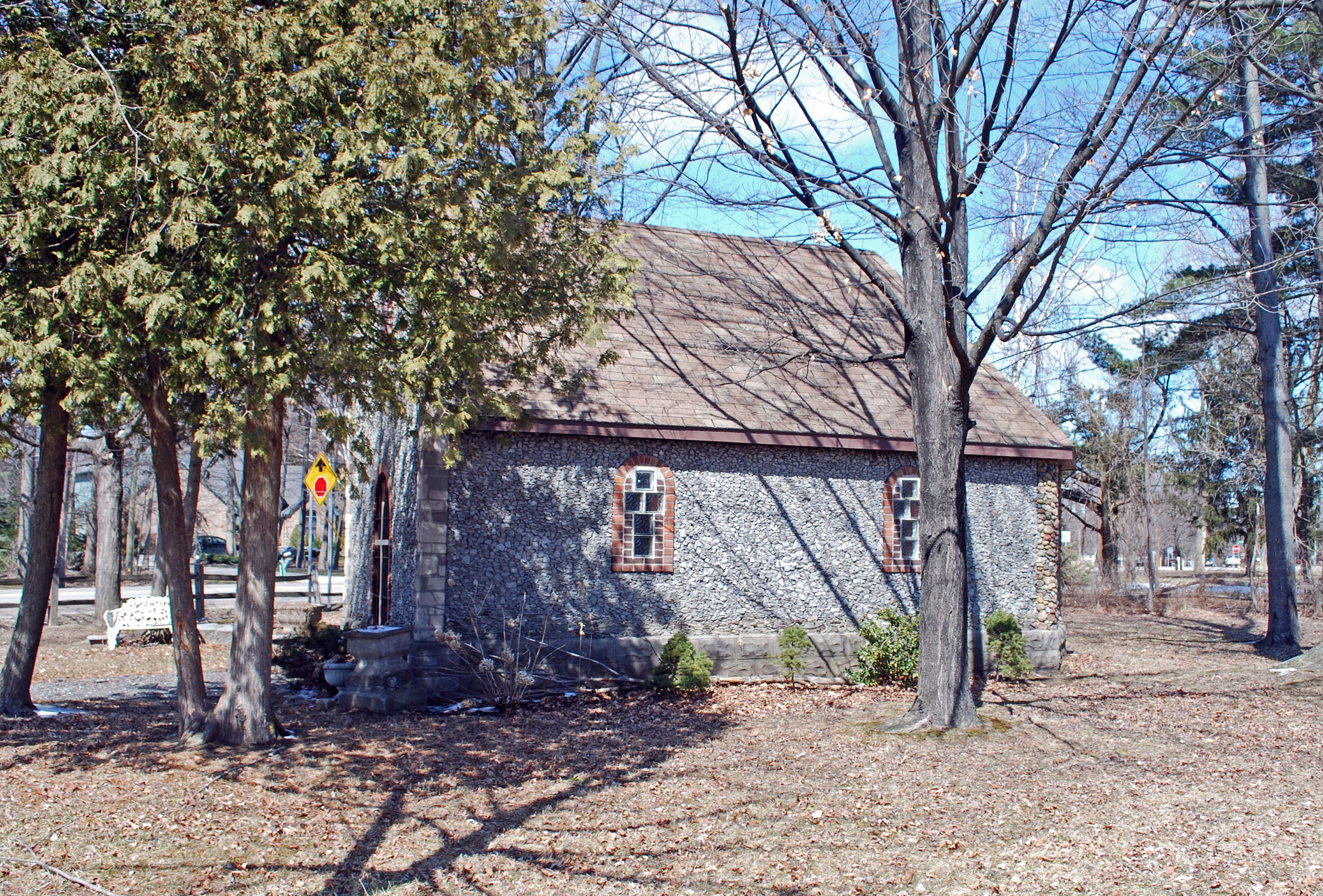
Side view of chapel

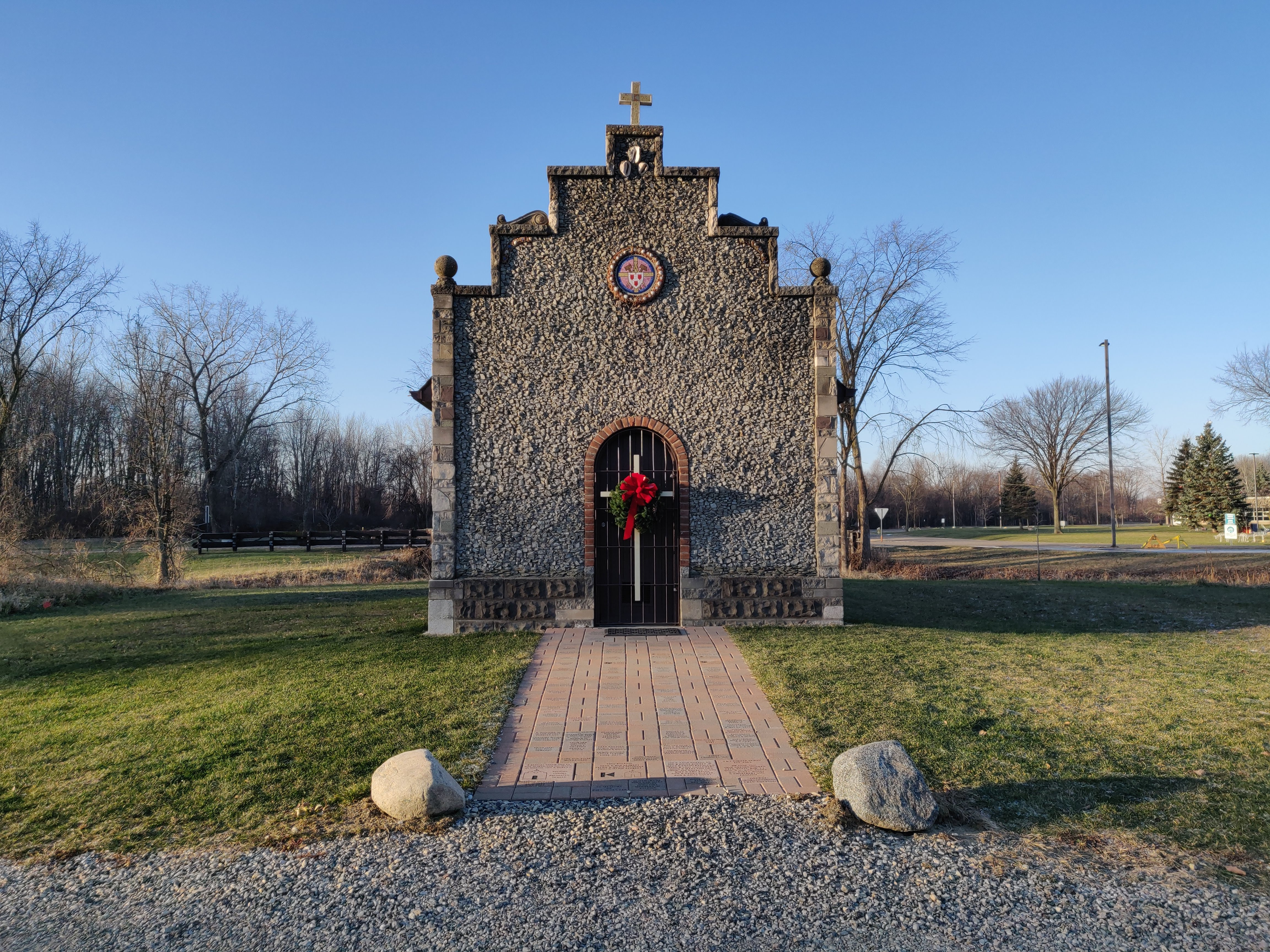
Kolping Chapel on its current site in the Chesterfield Historical Village
