= Thomas Sattelberger =

German politician (born 1949)

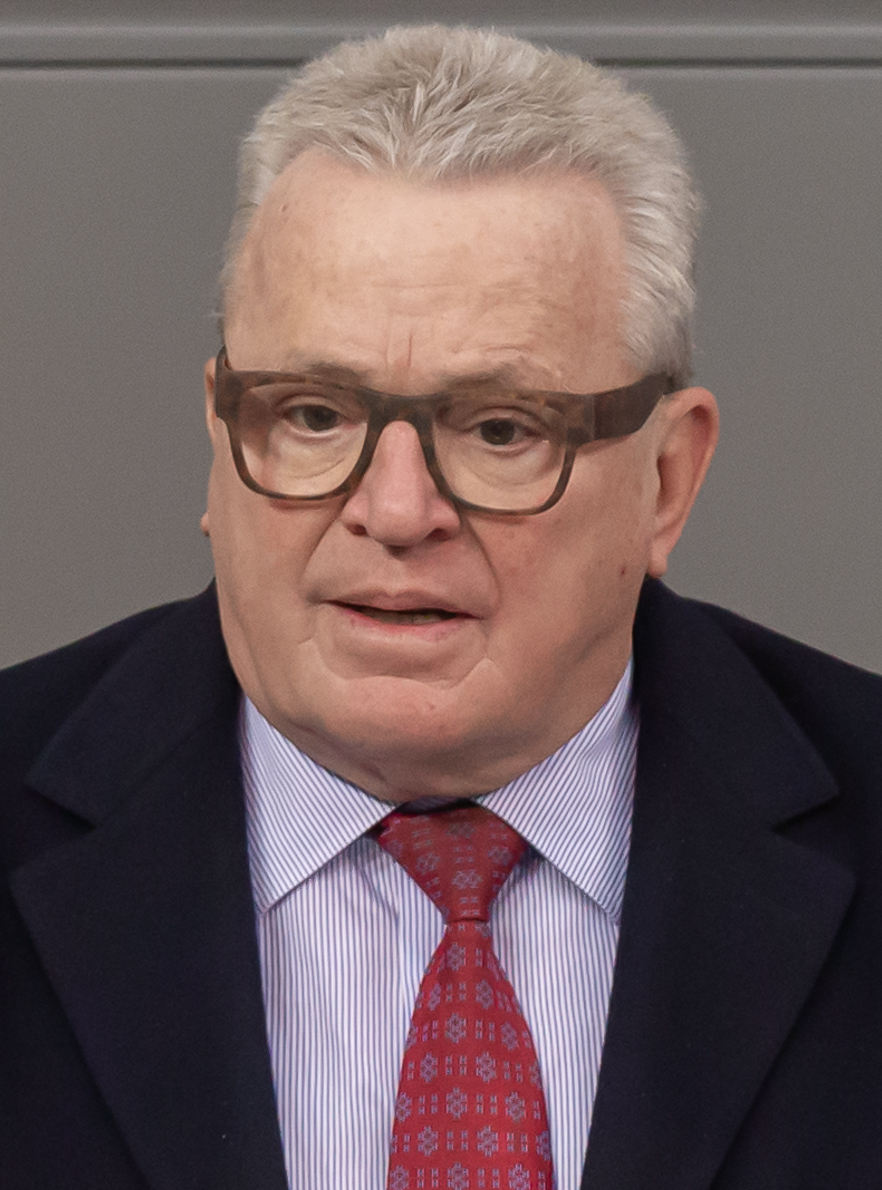
- Sattelberger in February 2020

Member of the Bundestag
- In office 2017 – 1 August 2022
- Succeeded by: Nils Gründer

Personal details
- Born: 5 June 1949 (age 76) Munderkingen, West Germany (now Germany)
- Party: FDP

Thomas Sattelberger (born 5 June 1949) is a German manager and politician of the Free Democratic Party (FDP) who served as a member of the Bundestag representing the state of Bavaria from 2017 to 2022.

In addition to his parliamentary work, Sattelberger served as Parliamentary State Secretary to the Federal Minister of Education and Research from December 2021 to May 2022. In this capacity, he was also the Commissioner for Translational Research.

He resigned from office in 2022 due to health and personal reasons.

== Early life and education ==
Born in Munderkingen, Baden-Württemberg, Sattelberger holds a degree in business administration (Duale Hochschule).

== Management career ==
From 1975 Sattelberger worked in the Central Education Directorate of Daimler-Benz in Stuttgart. In 1982 he moved to the MTU subsidiary, where his responsibilities included executive development, until he returned to the parent company in 1988 to become Head of Education & Management Development at the DASA in 1989. In 1994, he moved to Deutsche Lufthansa in Frankfurt as Head of Group Executives and Personnel Development, where he founded the Lufthansa School of Business, the first corporate university in Germany. In 2003 he joined Continental in Hanover as Executive Vice President Human Resources and Labor Director and in 2007 he held the same position at Deutsche Telekom in Bonn, where he remained until 2012.

== Political career ==
Sattelberger became a member of the Bundestag in the 2017 German federal election. From 2018 until 2021, he was a member of the Committee for Education, Research and Technology Assessment and the Committee for Labour and Social Affairs. He also served as his parliamentary group's spokesman for innovation, education and research.

In the negotiations to form a so-called traffic light coalition of the Social Democratic Party (SPD), the Green Party and the FDP following the 2021 German elections, Sattelberger was part of his party's delegation in the working group on innovation and research, co-chaired by Thomas Losse-Müller, Katharina Fegebank and Lydia Hüskens. Following the establishment of the new government, Sattelberger was appointed Parliamentary State Secretary to the Federal Minister of Education and Research. His main working topics were diversity, technological strategy, STEM education and digitization.

== Other activities ==
- Federal Agency for Disruptive Innovation (SPRIN-D), Ex-Officio Member of the Supervisory Board (2022)
- Fraunhofer Center for International Management and Knowledge Economy, Member of the Board of Trustees
- Deutsches Museum, Member of the Board of Trustees
- Institut for Employability (IBE) at the Ludwigshafen University of Applied Sciences, Member of the Advisory Board
- Magnus Hirschfeld Foundation, Alternate Member of the Board of Trustees (since 2018)
- Rotary International, Member (since 2020)
- AFS Intercultural Programs – Germany, Member of the Board of Trustees

== Personal life ==
Sattelberger is openly gay and lives with his partner in Munich.
