= Adolph Kolping =

German Catholic priest (1813–1865)

Blessed Adolph Kolping
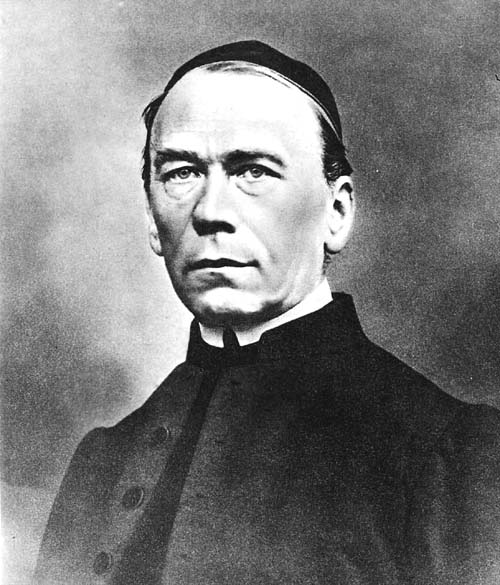
- Born: 8 December 1813; Kerpen, Rhein-Erft-Kreis, Confederation of the Rhine
- Died: 4 December 1865 (aged 51); Cologne, North Rhine-Westphalia, German Confederation
- Venerated in: Catholic Church
- Beatified: 27 October 1991, Saint Peter's Square, Vatican City by Pope John Paul II
- Feast: 6 December
- Attributes: Priest's attire
- Patronage: World Youth Day; Apprentices; Labourers; Social workers; Catholic entrepreneurs

Adolph Kolping (8 December 1813 – 4 December 1865) was a German Catholic priest and the founder of the Kolping Association. He led the movement for providing and promoting social support for workers in industrialized cities while also working to promote the dignities of workers in accordance with the social magisterium of the faith. He was called Gesellenvater (the Journeymen's Father).

The beatification for the priest commenced on 21 March 1934 and he was later titled as Venerable in 1989. His beatification was celebrated under Pope John Paul II on 27 October 1991 in Saint Peter's Square; his liturgical feast is not affixed to the date of his death as is the norm but rather on 6 December.

== Life ==
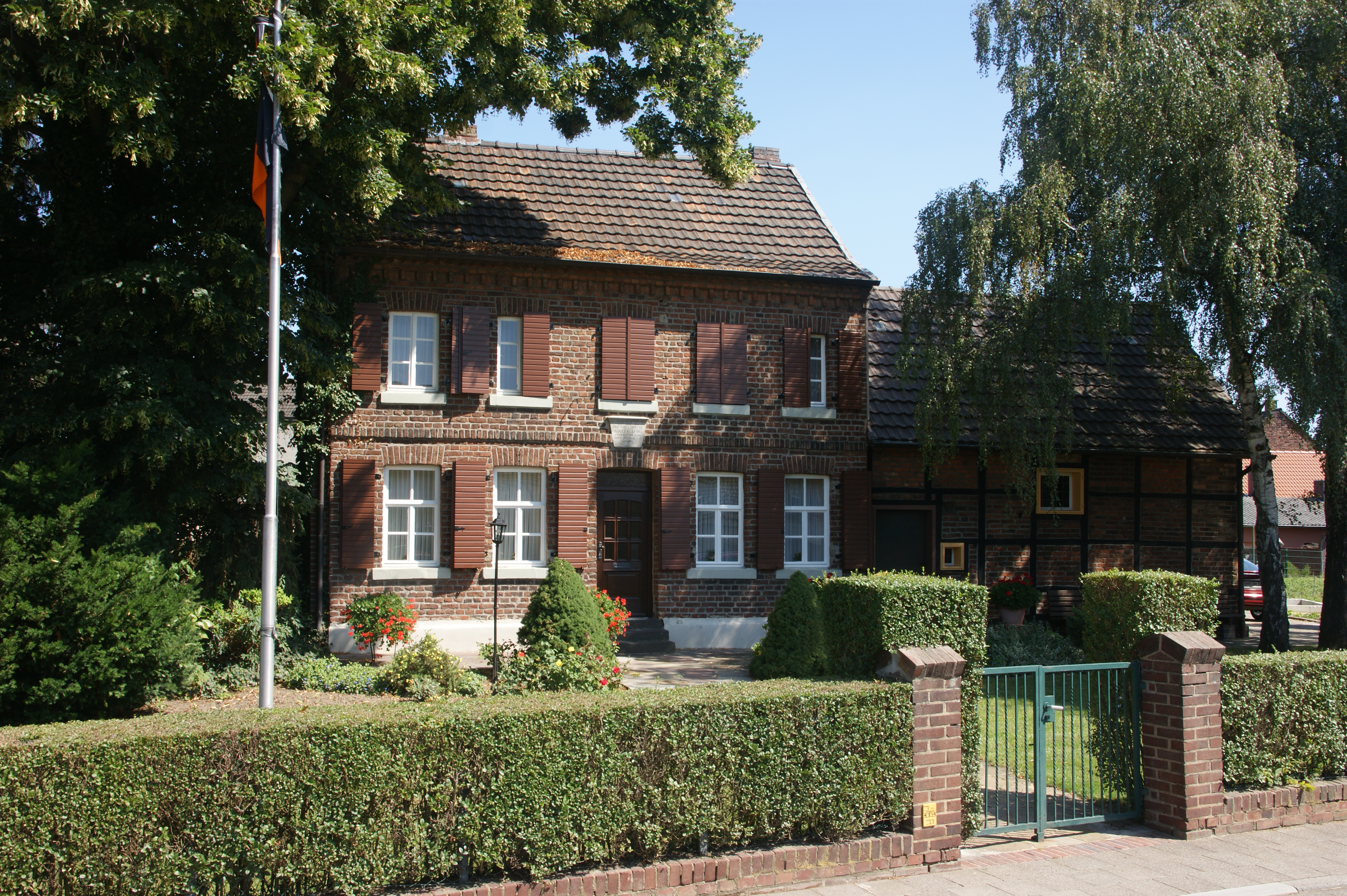
Kolping's birthplace

Adolph Kolping was born on 8 December 1813 in Kerpen as the fourth of five children to the poor shepherd Peter Kolping (d. 12 April 1845) and Anna Maria Zurheyden (d. 4 April 1833). He often lived in the shadow of frail health during his childhood.

He proved to be an able student while in school from 1820 to 1826 but his poverty prevented him from furthering his education despite his commitment to pursue additional studies. In 1831, he travelled to Cologne as a shoemaker's assistant and soon became shocked with the living conditions of the working class that lived there and this proved to be definitive in influencing his decision to become a priest; he remained a shoemaker until 1841. Kolping's desire for higher education never ceased. In summer 1834 he attended the Three Kings School and afterwards in 1841 began his theological education at the Ludwig-Maximilians-Universität München (1841–1842) as well as later at the University of Bonn (1842–1844) and the University of Cologne (26 March 1844 – 1845). His time spent on his studies saw him become friends with the future Bishop of Mainz Wilhelm Emmanuel von Ketteler.

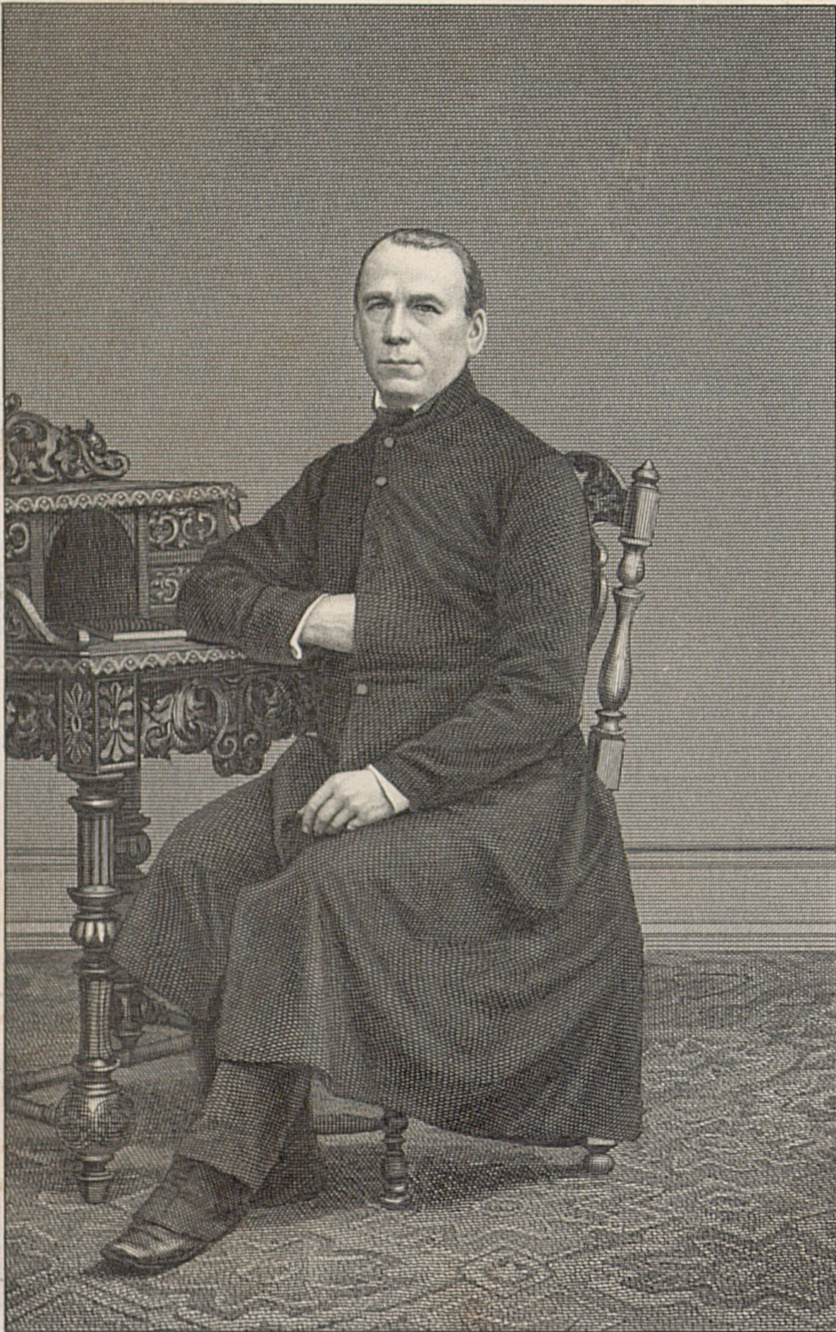
Kolping as a priest

Kolping was ordained to the priesthood on 13 April 1845 in Cologne's Minoritenkirche but his father died the night before such that his ordination was full of mixed emotions. He first served in Elberfeld – now part of Wuppertal – as a chaplain and religious education teacher from 1845 until 1849. There a number of journeymen carpenters had founded a choral society with the aid of a teacher and the local clergy. It grew rapidly into a Young Workmen's Society with the acknowledged object of fostering the religious life of the members, and at the same time of improving their mechanical skill. In 1847, he became the second president of the Gesellenverein, German Catholic societies for the religious, moral, and professional improvement of young men which gave its members both religious and social support.

In 1849 he returned to Cologne as the cathedral's vicar and established Cologne's branch of the Gesellenverein. "Initially his objective was to provide a home-away-from- home for young apprentices and journeymen while they learned a trade that would enable them to make a decent and honest living." The Cologne society soon acquired its own home, and opened therein a hospice for young traveling journeymen. In his efforts to develop the work Kolping was energetic and undaunted. He was eloquent both as speaker and writer. He visited the great industrial centres of Germany, Austria, Switzerland, and Hungary. In 1850 he united the existing associations as the "Rheinischer Gesellenbund" – this fusion was the origin of the present international "Kolpingwerk". In 1854, he founded the newspaper "Rheinische Volksblätter" (or the "Rhine Region People’s Paper") which quickly became one of the most successful press organs of his time. He was the editor of the Catholic People's Calendar from 1852 to 1853 and of the Calendar for the Catholic People from 1854 to 1855. In 1862 he became the rector of the Saint Maria Empfängnis church in Cologne. Pope Pius IX titled him as a Monsignor in 1862 – this came about after the pair met in Rome in a private audience in May to discuss the priest's work. By 1865, over 400 local groups of the journeymen’s organization had been established and were functioning throughout Europe and in America.

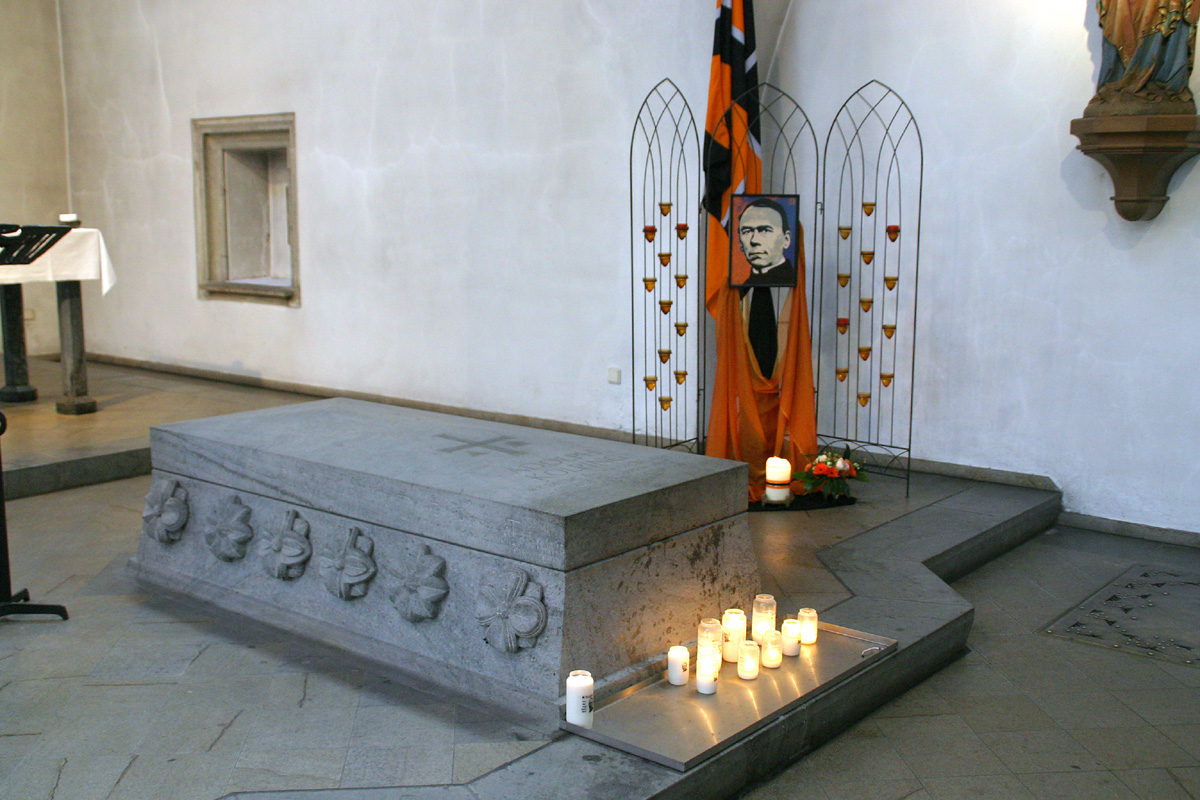
Tomb of Adolph Kolping in the Saint Maria Empfängnis church in Cologne

He died on 4 December 1865 due to lung cancer; he had suffered from a severe joint inflammation in his right forearm that spring. His remains are buried in the Saint Maria Empfängnis church (Minoritenkirche). He is remembered as the "Father of All Apprentices" and in 2003 was ranked eleventh in the Unsere Besten. Pope John Paul II visited his tomb in November 1980 while visiting the nation. He said:"We need models like Adolph Kolping in today’s Church."

== Quotes ==
"The signs of the times will teach you what to do."

"Let's show Christian living in ever more practical ways and the present will be better and the future brighter."

"The human life cannot exist without joy, without fun, least of all during youth. Thus joy and fun deserve an essential place in community life."

== Beatification ==
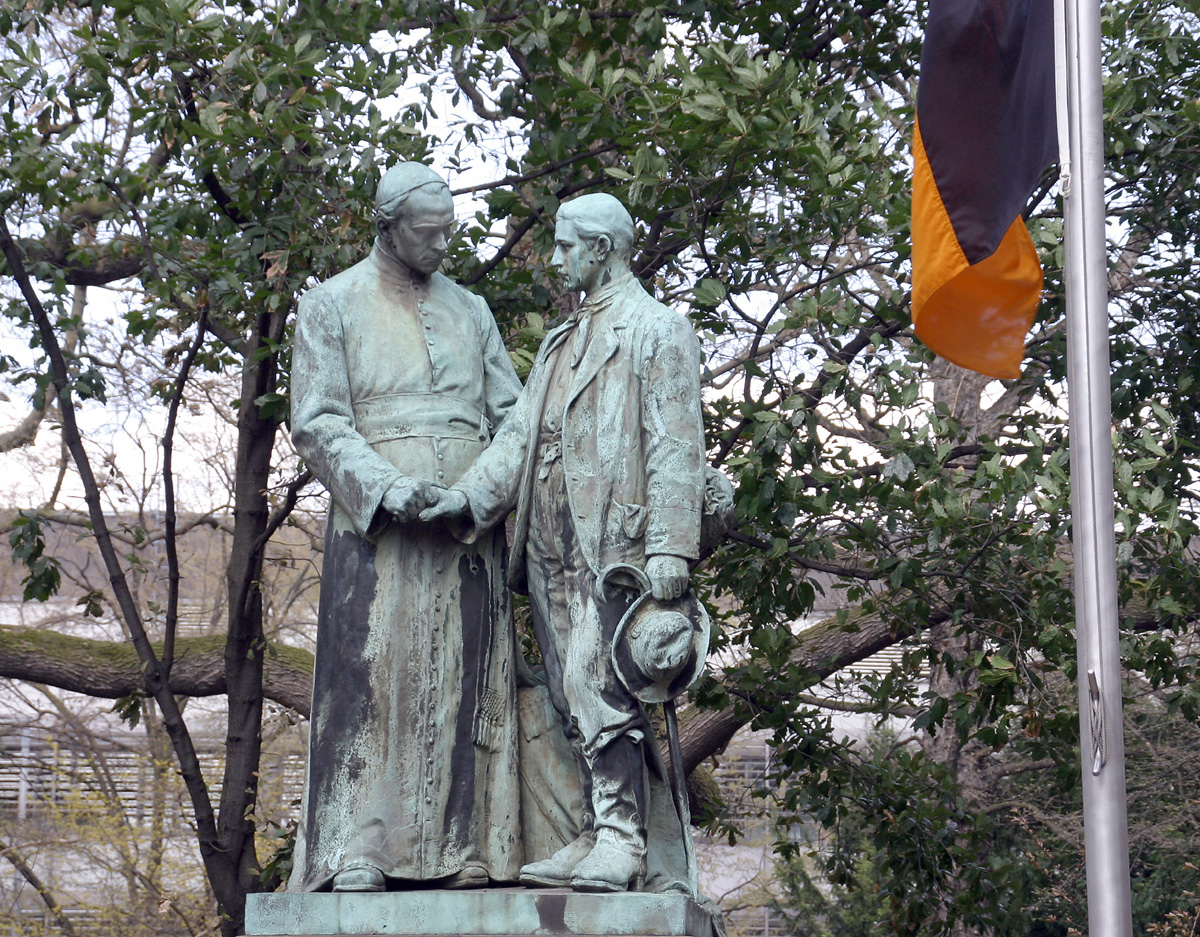
Adolph Kolping monument, Cologne

The beatification process opened under Pope Pius XI on 21 March 1934 and Kolping was titled as a Servant of God. The informative process opened on 21 March 1934 but the circumstances of the times – both political and religious – did not permit the process to continue. After the Second World War these efforts were resumed, with the process being reopened on 12 October 1950. Historians approved the cause on 24 February 1987 while the Congregation for the Causes of Saints (CCS) received the Positio from the postulation in 1988. Theologians approved the cause on 15 January 1988 as did the CCS on 18 April 1989; the confirmation of his heroic virtue allowed for Pope John Paul II to name him as Venerable on 13 May 1989.

The miracle that led to his beatification was investigated in the diocese of origin and later received C.C.S. validation on 5 December 1987 before a medical board approved it on 24 January 1990. The theologians also approved the cause on 18 May 1990 as did the CCS on 23 October 1990 while John Paul II issued his definitive approval for it on 22 January 1991. The pope beatified Kolping on 27 October 1991 in Saint Peter's Square.

== Legacy ==
Kolping’s personal witness and apostolate helped prepare for Pope Leo XIII’s encyclical "Rerum Novarum"—"On the Social Order". The first American branch of the Kolping Society began in St. Louis, Missouri, in 1856. As of 2021, there are branches in over thirty countries. The International Headquarters is located across the street from the Minoritenkirche.

In 1932, the Detroit branch of the Kolping society established the Kolping Park and Chapel in Chesterfield Township, Michigan. It was designated a Michigan State Historic Site in 1996 and is listed on the National Register of Historic Places.
