= Minoritenkirche, Cologne =

Franciscan church from the 13th century

Coordinates: 50°56′21″N 6°57′19″E

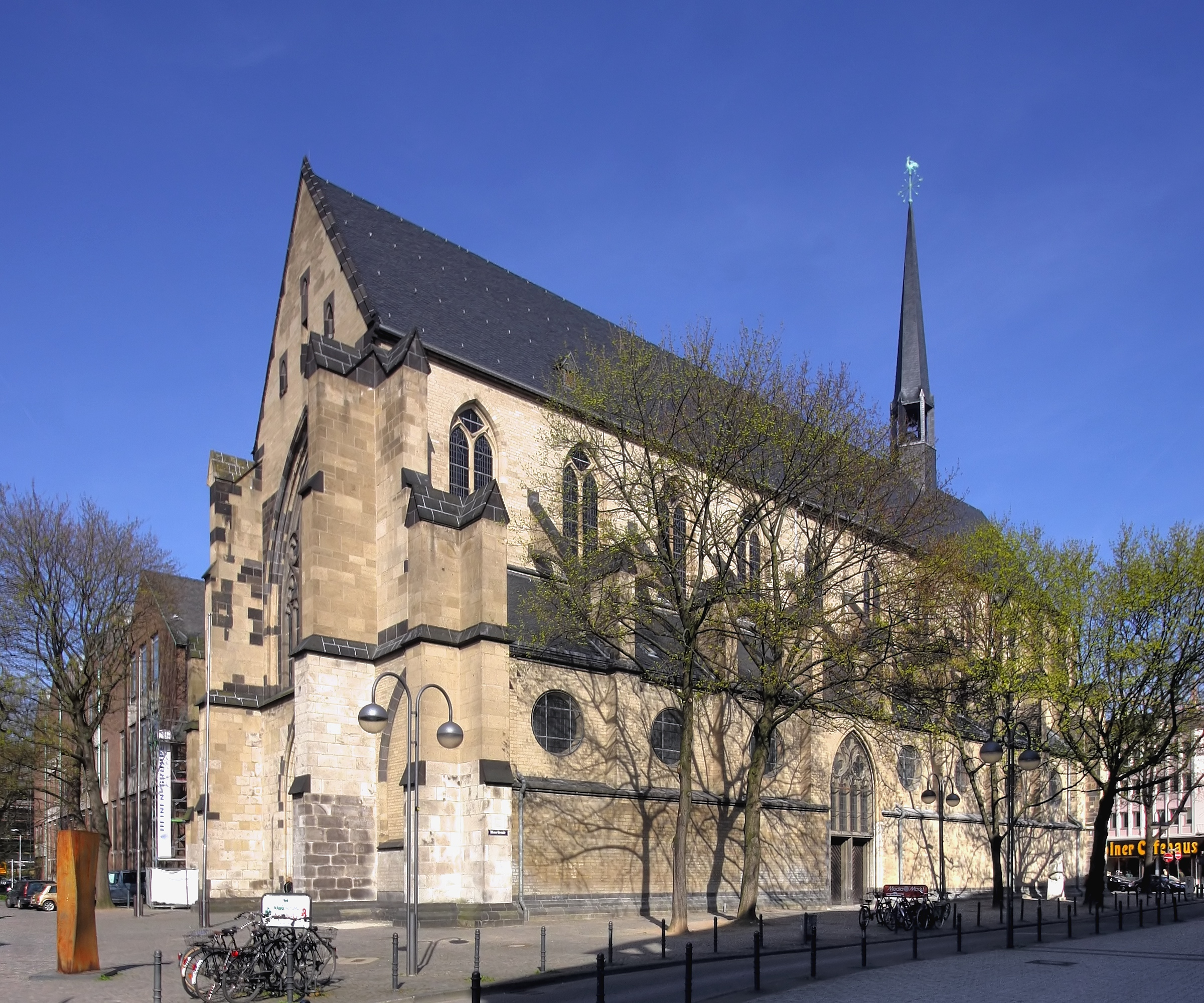
The church

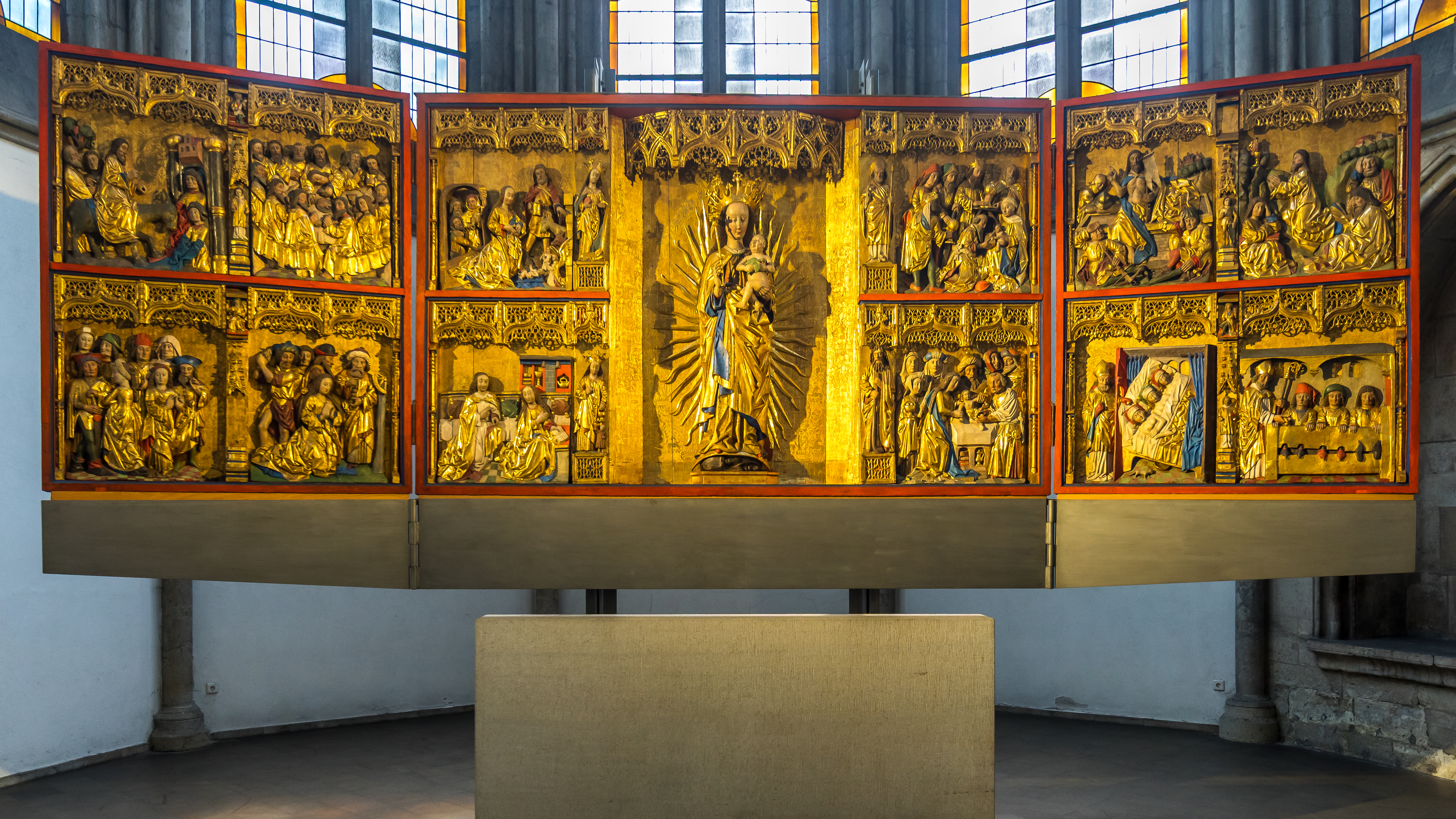
High altarpiece

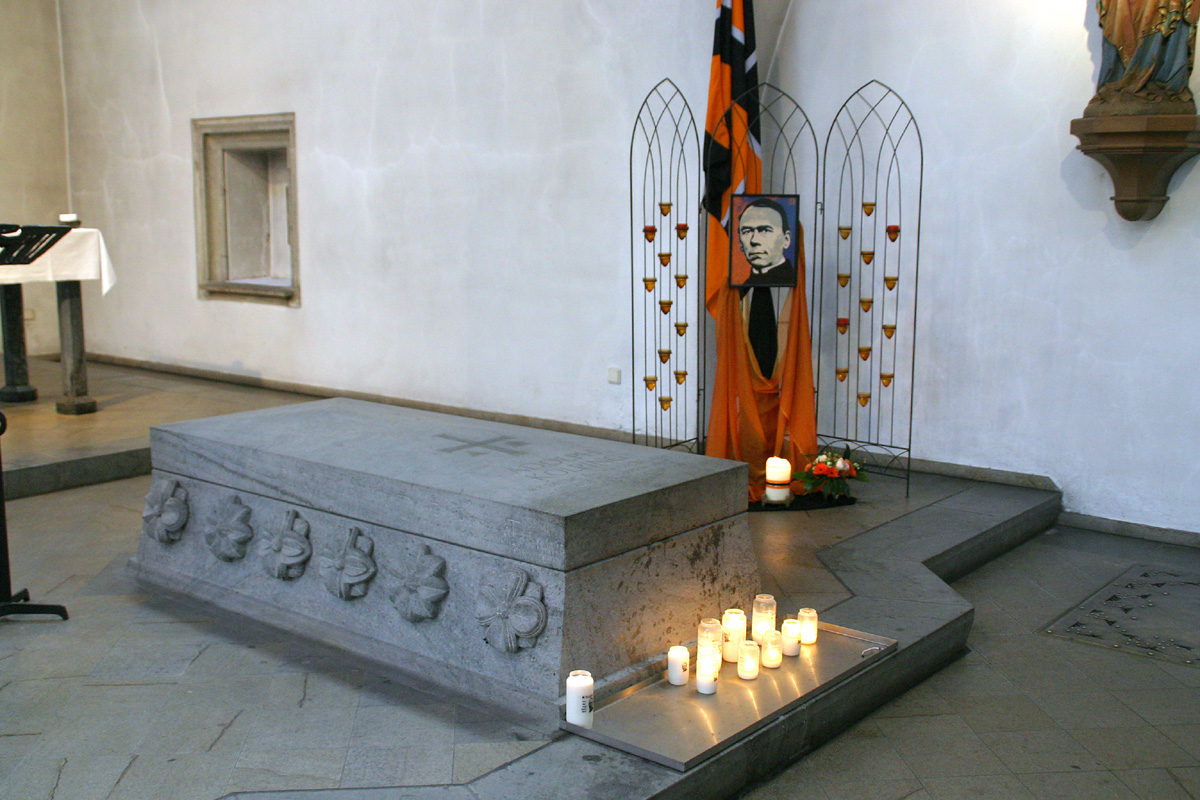
Tomb of Adolph Kolping

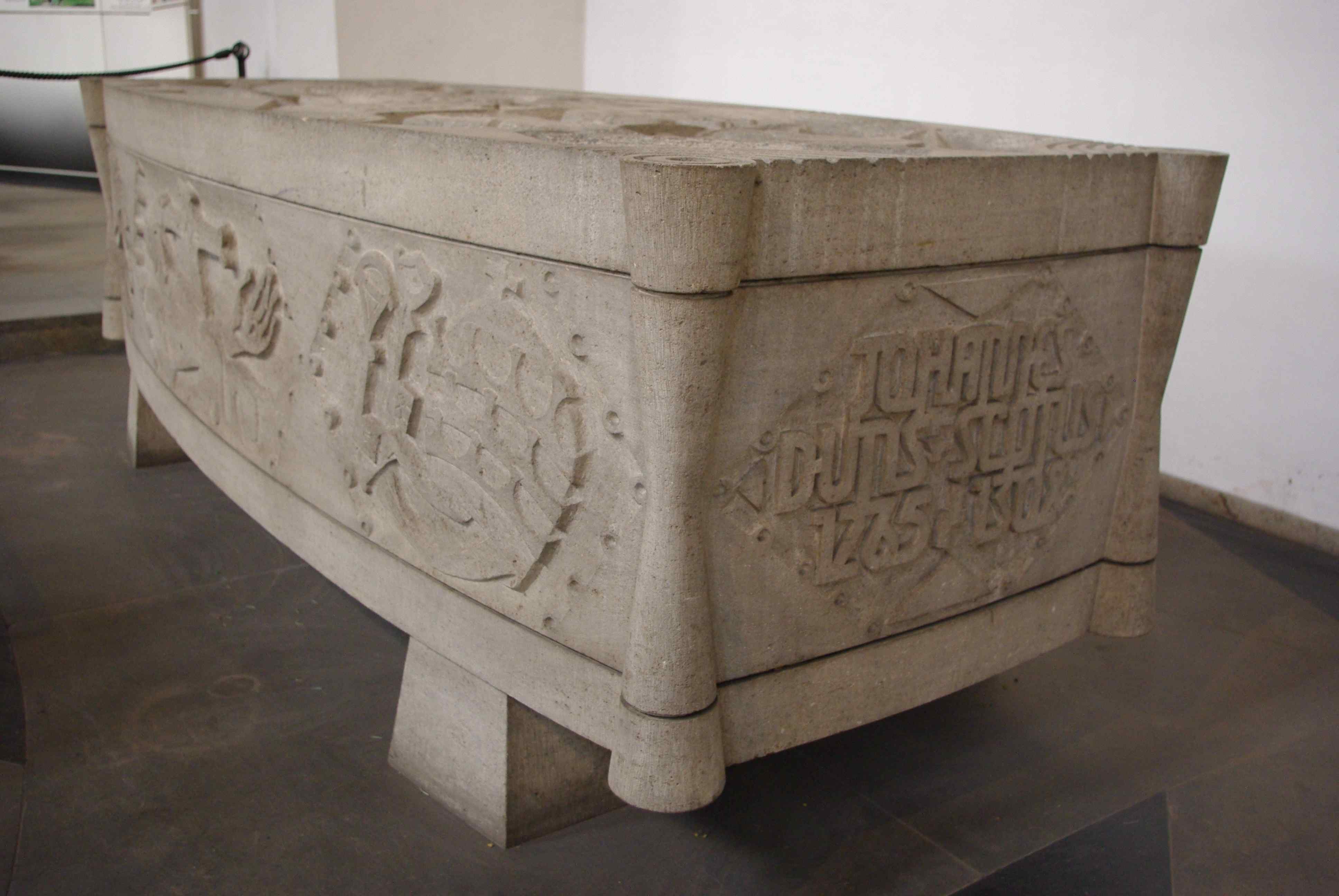
Tomb of Duns Scotus

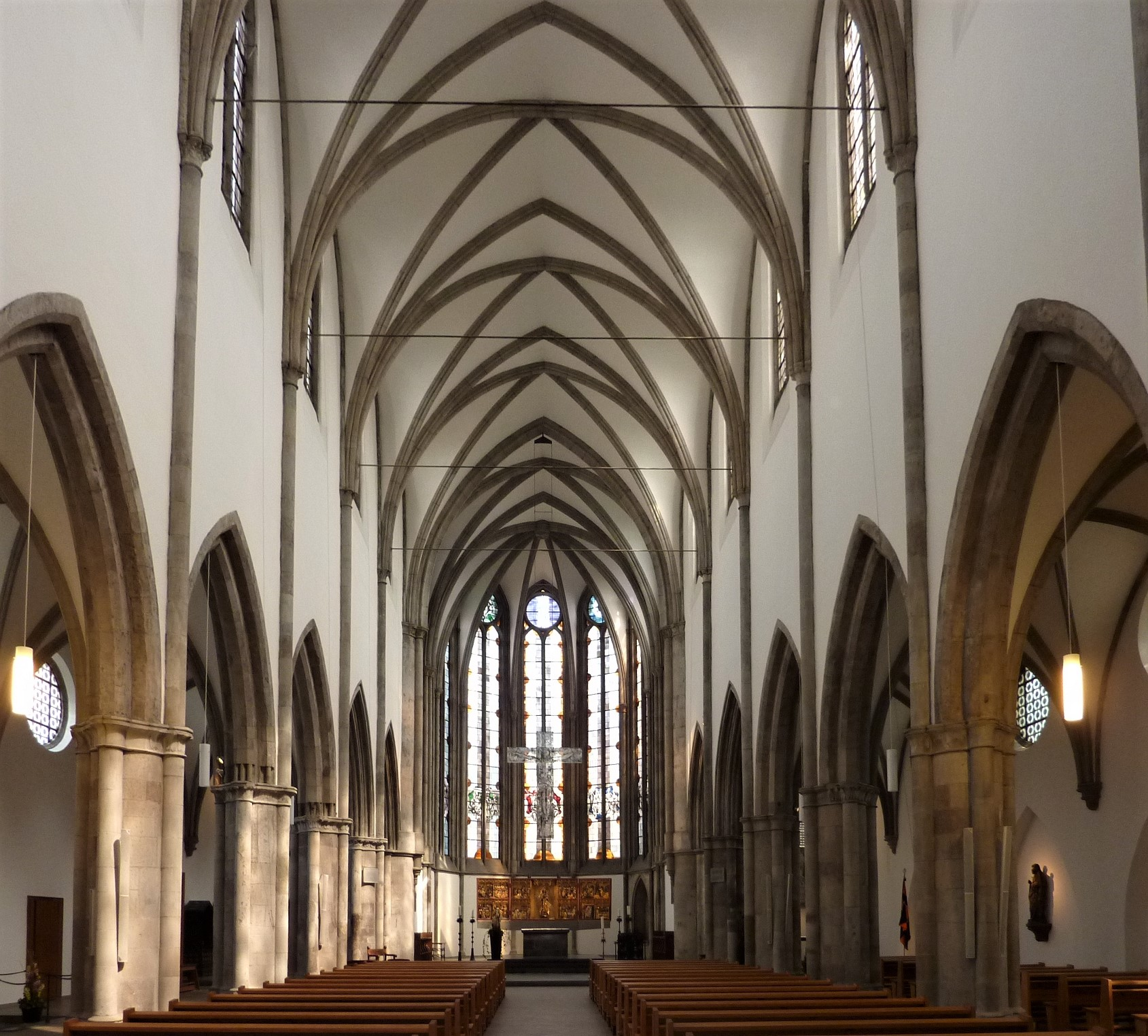
Nave

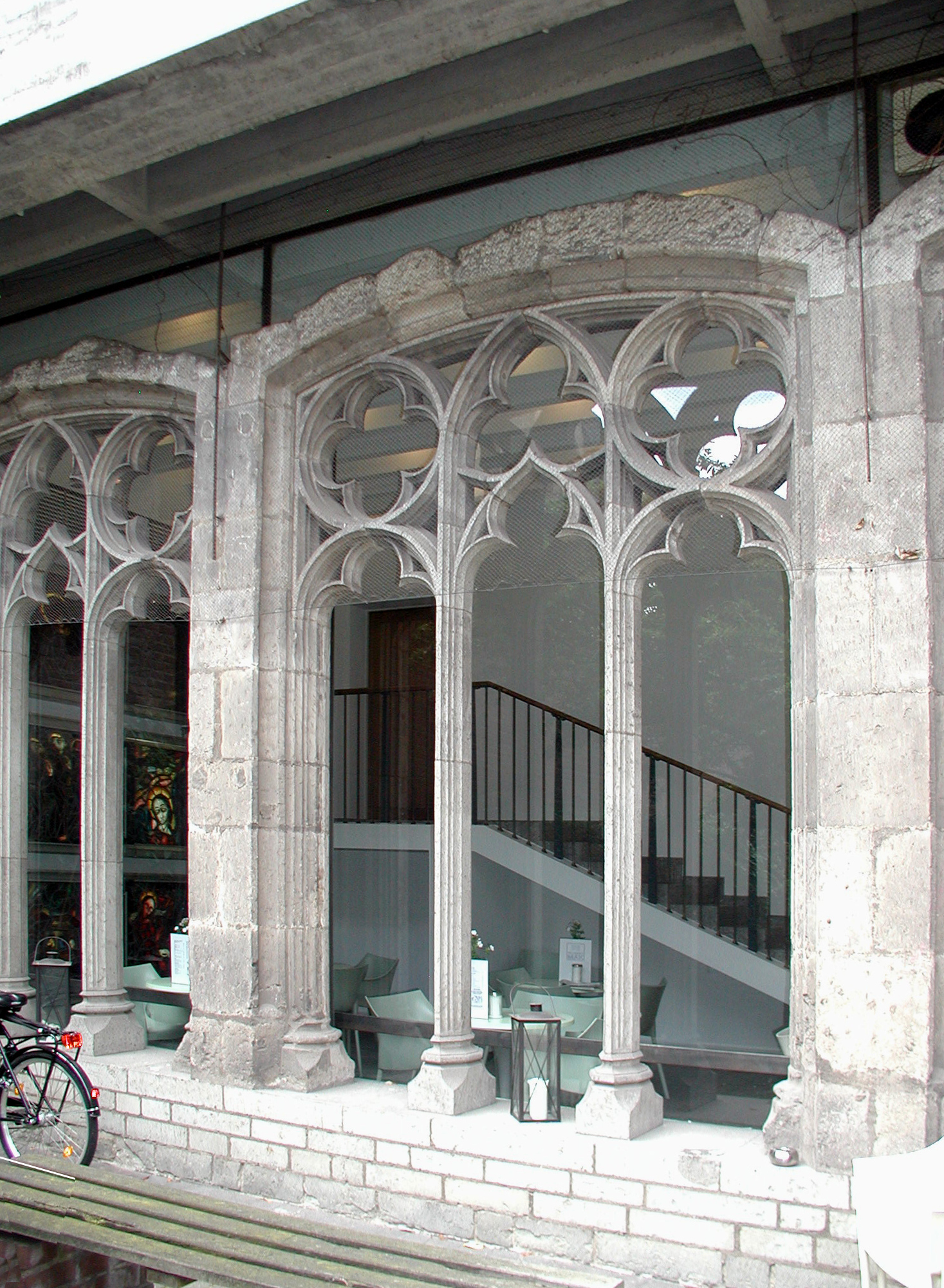
Remains of the cloister

The Minoritenkirche, or Church of the Immaculate Conception (German: St. Mariä Empfängnis), is a Catholic church on the Kolpingplatz in Cologne. Built in the 13th century, it is now used by the Franciscan and the Kolpingwerk social association.

It is notable for containing the tombs of Duns Scotus and Adolph Kolping, both of whom were beatified by Pope John Paul II – Kolping was also ordained priest in the church. Kolping and Scotus both feature on the new west doors designed by Paul Nagel in 2006.

== History ==
Typically for Franciscan monastery churches, it was built in the Gothic style. It took from 1245 to about 1260 to build its early-Gothic choir, with a three-aisle nave added in the 14th century. As the Franciscans are a mendicant order, they built a ridge turret but no bell tower, indications of the poverty adopted by the order. When the French Revolution spread to Cologne in 1794, the Franciscans were expelled from the church and the adjoining monastery. The occupying forces seized the buildings in 1804 and four years later turned them into the headquarters for secular social work in the city.

In 1846 the church was handed over to the city's cathedral chapter for use as an annexe church to Cologne Cathedral and four years later archbishop Johannes von Geissel made it the diocesan church for confirmations and ordinations. He also instigated a restoration which was completed in 1862, partly thanks to a 40,000 Taler donation from the businessman Johann Heinrich Richartz (1795–1861), who had already set up the Wallraf-Richartz-Museum on the former site of the monastery buildings.

== Organ ==
A new Romanus Seifert & Sohn organ was installed in 1997, with 44 registers, divided into three manuals and pedals, with mechanical trackers and electrical registers. The expression pedal is equipped with Barker levers.

I Hauptwerk C–g^{3}
1.	Gedackt	16′
2.	Principal	8′
3.	Flûte harm.	8′
4.	Spitzflöte	8′
5.	Octave	4′
6.	Rohrflöte	4′
7.	Quinte	2 2/3′
8.	Superoctave	2′
9.	Mixtur V	1 1/3′
10.	Cornett V (ab c^{0})	8′
11.	Trompete	8′

II Schwellwerk C–g^{3}
12.	Bourdon	16′
13.	Principal	8′
14.	Flöte	8′
15.	Viola da Gamba	8′
16.	Voix céleste (ab c^{0})	8′
17.	Principal	4′
18.	Traversflöte	4′
19.	Nasard	2 2/3′
20.	Octavin	2′
21.	Terz	1 3/5′
22.	Mixtur IV	2′
23.	Trompette harm.	8′
24.	Hautbois	8′
25.	Clairon	4′
	Tremulant

III Positiv C–g^{3}
26.	Bourdon	8′
27.	Quintade	8′
28.	Principal	4′
29.	Blockflöte	4′
30.	Gemshorn	2′
31.	Sifflöte	1 1/3′
32.	Scharff III	1′
33.	Sesquialter II	2 2/3′
34.	Cromorne	8′
	Tremulant

Pedal C–f^{1}
35.	Subbass	32′
36.	Principalbass	16′
37.	Subbass	16′
38.	Quintbass	10 2/3′
39.	Octavbass	8′
40.	Bassflöte	8′
41.	Choralbass	4′
42.	Hintersatz IV	2 2/3′
43.	Bombarde	16′
44.	Trompete	8′

- Stops: II/I, III/I, III/II, I/P, II/P, III/P
- Stops: 768-fache combination action

== Bells ==
The ridge-turret houses two bells, both cast in Münster by Feldmann & Marschel. They replace two bells cast in 1754 and 1853 which were destroyed during the Second World War. As with the 'Kirchen am Neumarkt' (St. Aposteln, the Antoniterkirche and St. Peter), both bells ring at 16:45 on Saturdays and Sundays, whilst the 'Marienglocke' rings the Angelus on its own at 19:30 each evening.

Nr.	Name	Cast in	Diameter (mm)	Weight (kg)	Nominal (16tel)	Inscription
1	Maria	1954	790	280	h^{1} –2	„Maria, mein erstes Geläut preiset dein Heiliges Jahr. Immaculata, dir singet jubelnd mein Mund immerdar."
2	Kolping	1952	660	160	d^{2} ±0	„1711 ward ich gegossen / 1865 verkündete ich Kolpings Tod / 1942 ward ich ins Mark getroffen / 1952 erstand ich neu nach schwerer Not / Im Leiden stählt sich die Seele."

== Bibliography (in German) ==
- Hans-Joachim Kracht: Adolph Kolping: Priester, Pädagoge, Publizist im Dienst christlicher Sozialreform. Herder Verlag. Freiburg im Breisgau u. a. 1993, S. 159–163, ISBN 3451213273.
- Heinrich Neu: Die Minoritenkirche zu Köln. Münster-Verlag, Köln 1949.
- Bernhard Ridder: Kolpings Grabeskirche, das Familienheiligtum der Kolpingssöhne, Kolping Verlag, Köln 1958.
