= Lampenflora =

Autotrophic organisms in caves

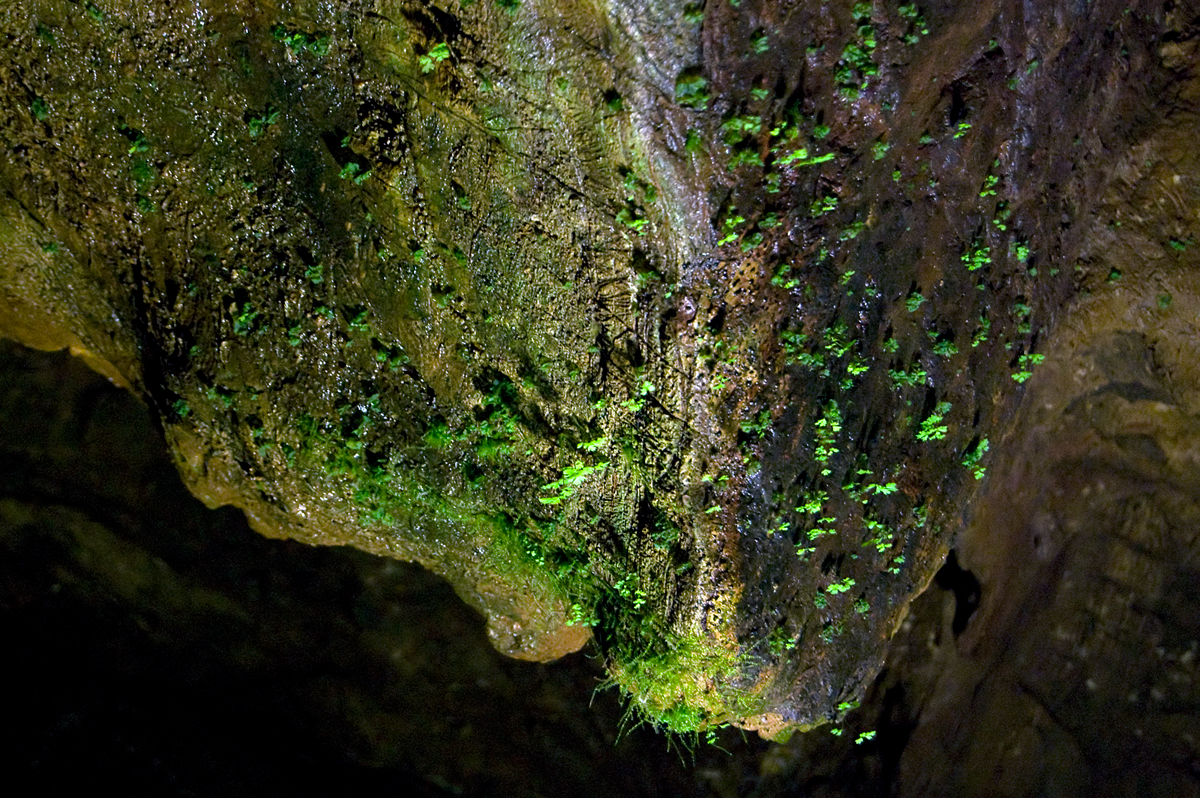
Lampenflora in the Kubacher Kristallhöhle

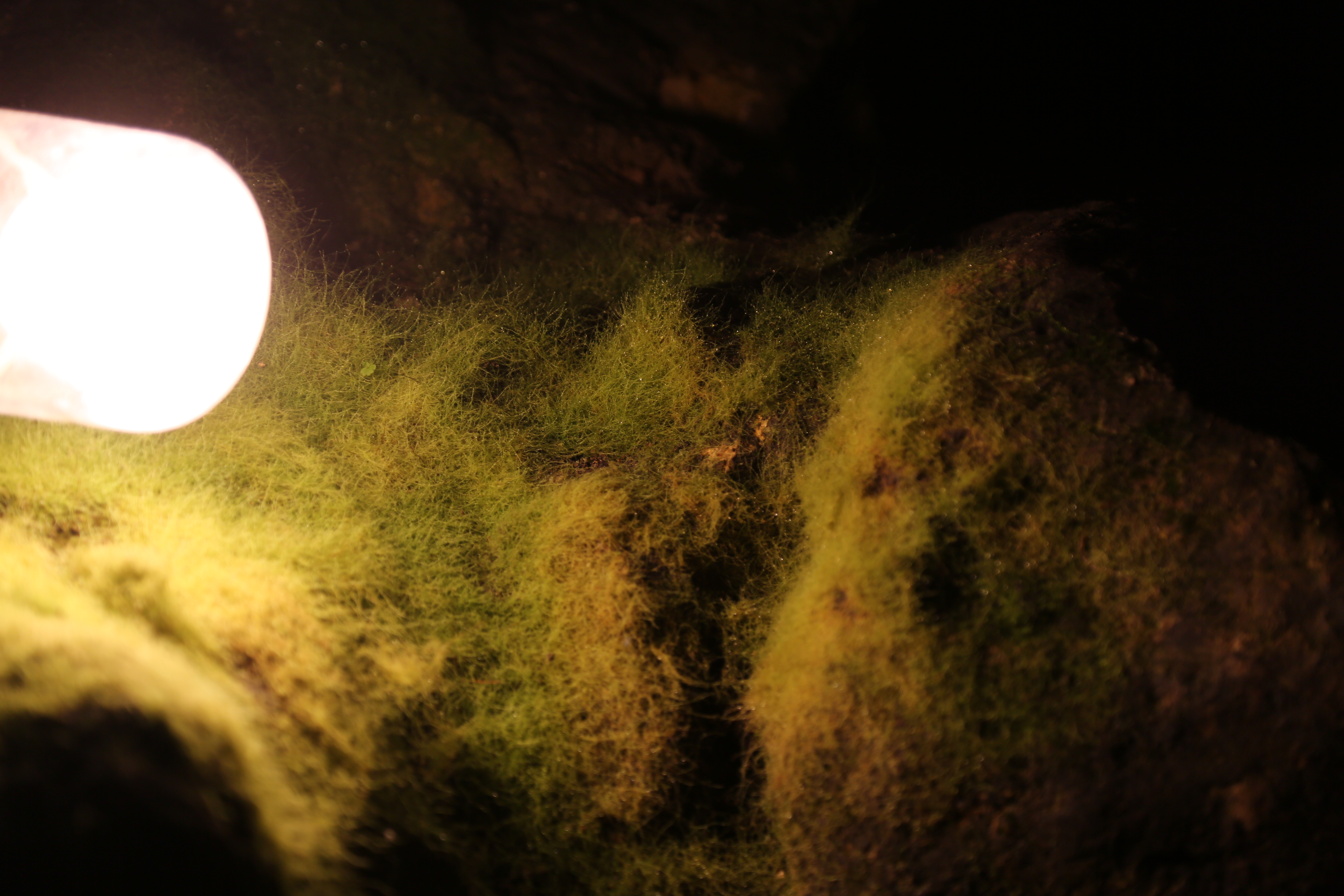
Moss in the UNESCO World Heritage Cave Hohler Fels

Lampenflora, also known in English as lamp-flora or lamp flora are autotrophic lifeforms present in natural or artificial caves associated with permanently installed lighting. Lampenflora are a problem with respect to the conservation of cave features, artworks, and fauna, and consequently their presence in caves can be referred to by the terms green sickness and la maladie verte.

== Etymology ==
The term "lampenflora" has come to English from German. It was coined by botanist Klaus Dobat in the 1960s, and just means "lamp flora" or "flora of the lamps"

== Taxa found in lampenflora ==
So far the following types of lampenflora have been described:

- cyanobacteria
- algae – Chlorophyceae, golden algae (Chrysophyceae), diatoms (Bacillariophyceae)
- non-vascular plants – Marchantiophyta (Marchantiophyta), moss (Bryophyta)
- ferns – Species of the genera Asplenium (spleenworts), Cystopteris (bladder ferns), Adiantum (maidenhair ferns), etc.
- flowering plants – alternate-leaved golden-saxifrage (Chrysosplenium alternifolium); black elder (Sambucus nigra) has been growing in the Lurgrotte near Peggau in Styria.

Fungi and roots growing into caves, as well as plants growing in naturally illuminated areas, are not lampenflora.

== Development ==
The requirements for the development of lampenflora are sufficient (artificial) light and moisture. An increase in nutrient content (e.g. fertilizer usage on land above the cave) or heat (e.g. incandescent lighting) may lead to an increase in lampenflora. The germs, seeds or spores can get brought into the cave by air, water, animals or people.

Lampenflora tend to grow best on rough surfaces and in red or blue light due to the plant's absorption rate of this light into its chlorophyll. However, pre-established colonies of lampenflora can survive even after long periods of light deprivation.

In the aphotic (lightless) part of caves, short-term growth of photosynthetic plants is possible thanks to the seed's nutritive tissue. After this is consumed, the plant dies.

== Lampenflora as a problem ==
Lampenflora can cause various problems: Since lampenflora changes the appearance of show caves, it can give visitors wrong impressions of natural caves. It does not exist in caves not developed for humans. The weak acids excreted by lampenflora can also cause damage to and change limestone and other rocks. Lampenflora is especially dangerous to artifacts present in caves, such as cave paintings. The appearance of algae was one of the reasons the Lascaux cave was closed to the public.

Lampenflora is often overlooked as an issue because show caves bring in such a large profit to the community. Sometimes lampenflora is used as being a part of the 'natural' attraction and are shown off as another part of the cave. While presenting it as an attraction is uncommon, it has been known to occur in the Natural Bridges Caverns (Texas) or in Karstic Caves in Vietnam.

== Reduction of lampenflora ==
There are several methods for reducing lampenflora. A lot of measures involve changing lighting in caves, such as lighting which only activates when people are nearby, LED lighting which produces less heat, and placing lighting further away from surfaces. Reducing red and blue light in favor of yellow light can also help, but generally makes caves less visually appealing and can make certain structures less visible. Even with special lighting certain algae species can still appear.

Lampenflora can also be periodically removed either physically or chemically. The use of phytotoxic compounds must take into account the integrity of the ecology both inside and outside the cave, and the health of visitors and cave guides.

Cave Effected & Location	Cave Closed?	Effects of Lampenflora and treatment of Lampenflora
Lascaux, France	Yes	Suffered ecological successive crisis; Radial change in ecological conditions
Crypt of Original Sin, Italy	No	Lampenflora was treated with biocides; Treatment permanently damaged the substrate underneath
Javoříčko Cave, Czech Republic	No	Lampenflora was successfully removed with a Sodium Hypochlorite solution; Substrate was damaged due to the treatment
