= Lurgrotte =

Cave and archaeological site in Austria

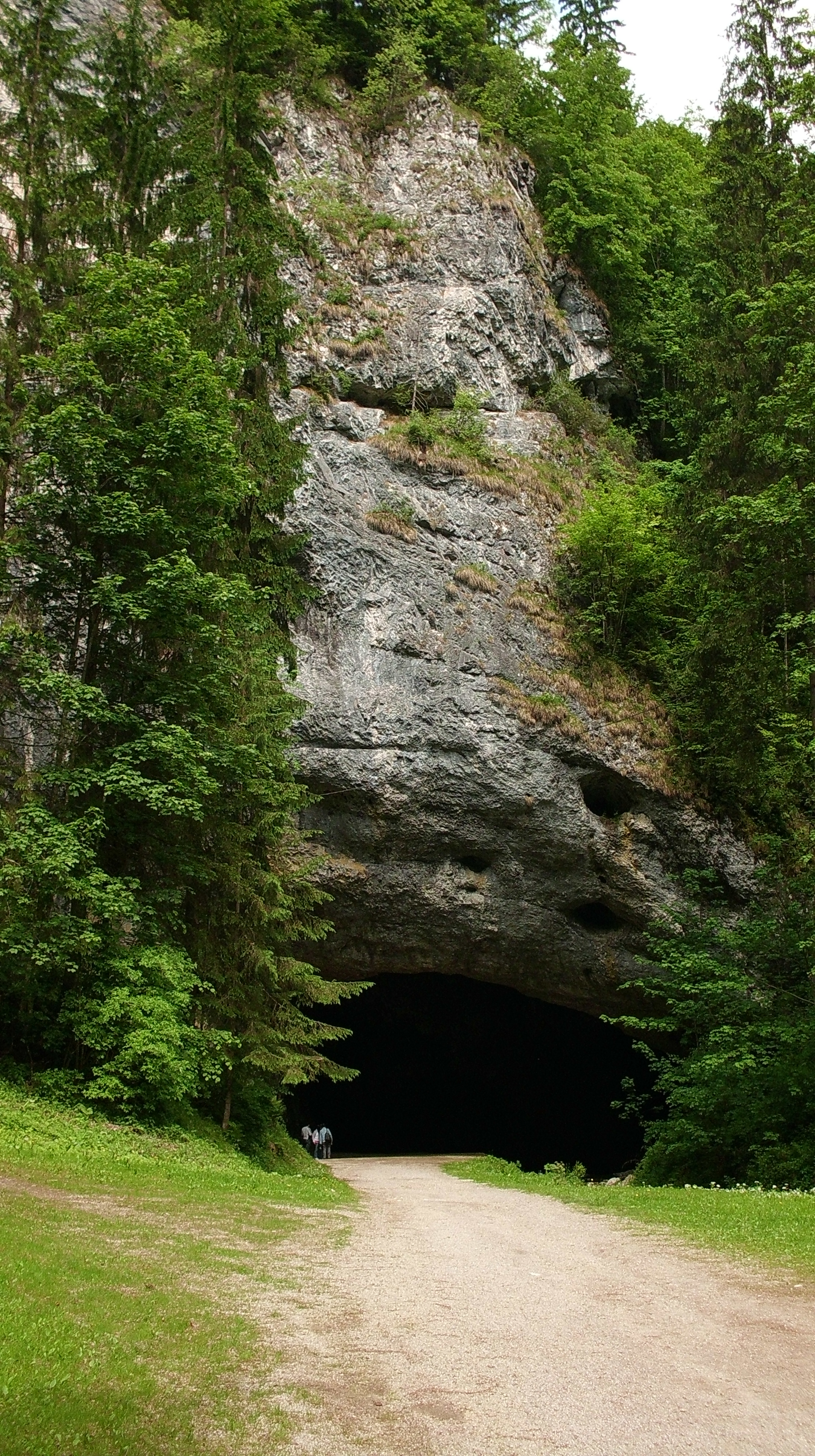
- Entrance to the Lurgrotte near Semriach

- Location within Austria
- Interactive map of Lurgrotte
- Location: Styria, Austria
- Coordinates: 47°13′37″N 15°22′46″E
- Depth: -273 m (896 ft)
- Length: 5,975 m (19,603 ft)
- Elevation: 640 m (2,100 ft)
- Discovery: 1893
- Geology: Karst
- Entrances: 2
- Entrances list: Semriach; Peggau
- Access: Public at both entrances
- Show cave opened: 1933
- Show cave length: Approximately 2 km (1.2 mi)
- Lighting: Electrical
- Registry: Austrian Cave no. 2836/1

The Lurgrotte karst cave is the largest cave in the Eastern Alps of Styria, Austria. It is located about 16 km (9.9 mi) north of Graz and crosses the Tannenben karst region. The cave has two accessible entrances, one at the village of Semriach and the other at the village of Peggau. At the Semriach entrance, the Lurbach River sinks into the cave. At the Peggau entrance, the Schmelz River emerges from within the cave, flowing to the west and eventually joining the Mur River.

== History ==
Archaeologists have found material in and around the cave that indicates habitation since the Paleolithic era. One specimen, a reindeer bone with tool markings, has been radiocarbon dated to approximately 52,000 years ago.

The cave was first scientifically explored by the Italian cave explorer Max Brunello on April 1, 1894. While the higher portions of the cave were known to locals, Brunello was the first to discover the lower portion of the cave. The next attempt to explore further provoked disaster.

On April 29, 1894, seven cavers entered the Lurgrotte, despite heavy rainfall. A flash flood occurred while they were inside, and they wound up trapped for ten days. Emperor Franz Joseph I approved a rescue effort, employing large numbers of workers, miners, and divers who bailed out the water and successfully rescued the trapped cavers.

In February 1905, members of the Austrian Tourist Club surveyed 1,002 m (3,287 ft) of passages within the Lurgrotte.

In the 1920s, the cave explorer Hermann Mayer worked with his father to develop the Peggauer section of the Lurgrotte for visitors. In addition, they tried to find a link between the Peggauer entry and Semriach entry. On November 26, 1924, the route was cleared by explosives, but it was not until 1935 that the first crossing was possible.

On May 23, 1926, the pioneering female cave explorer Leopoldine "Poldi" Fuhrich fell approximately 20 m (66 ft) to her death while exploring Lurgrotte. There is a memorial plaque for her still inside the cave.

On February 24, 1927, the city of Frohnleiten hosted an auction for the grotto, including a restaurant, two mansions, and 35,359 m^{2} (380,600 sq ft) of ground, in the interests of preserving the Lurgrotte as a domestic enterprise. On July 8, 1927, the District Court of Frohnleiten held another auction of the Lurgrotte, which was eventually won by a wine-trader named Pezzi. Pezzi planned to turn the Lurgrotte into a show cave and construct railway through the cave.

The first complete crossing of about 5 km (3.1 mi) long cave succeeded in 1935. In the following years the Lurgrotte was developed into a show cave, with infrastructure such as bridges, walkways, and lights added for visitors. From 1962 it was possible for visitors to wander through the entire cave, until 1975, when parts of the infrastructure were washed away in a powerful storm. Because the flooding recurs on a yearly basis, the full infrastructure has never been repaired.

== Hydrology ==
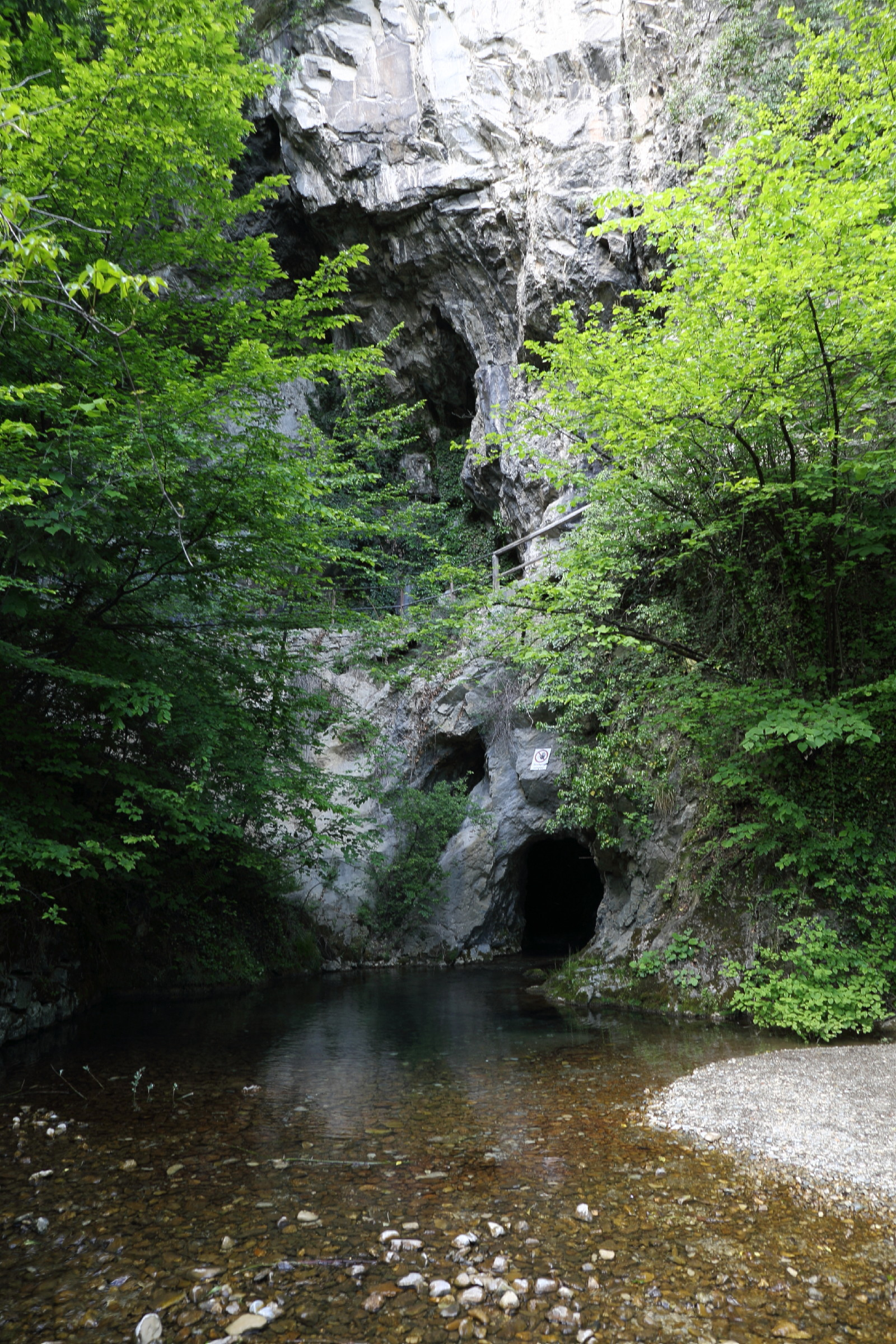
The Schmelz River flowing from the Peggau entrance to the Lurgrotte.

The Lurgrotte is a complex, three-level cave which forms a drainage system for the entire Tanneben karst area. Because of its complexity, and the difficulty in exploring the cave's numerous underground channels, the cave's hydrology is poorly understood. It is known that the Lur River enters at the Semriach entry, and the Schmelz River exits from the Peggau side. When rainfall is heavy, excess water from the Lur system can overflow into the Schmelz system, so it is confirmed that there is a high-water connection between the two, although its location and extent are still unknown.

Attempts to trace the outflow using dye have shown that the water from the Lur emerges in springs south of the cave, while the flow of the Schmelz appears to originate from sources north of the Lurgrotte.

== Tourism ==
Since the flooding of 1975, it is no longer possible to cross through the caves from one side to another. Visitors can instead tour through a shortened area at each end of the cave. From Peggau, regular guided tours enter 1 km (0.62 mi) into the cave, although in the winter longer tours of up to 4 km (2.5 mi) are available by appointment.

From Semriach, tourists have access to approximately 2 km (1.2 mi) of the cave, including its largest gallery, called the Big Dome or the Bear Grotto due to the cave bear bones that have been found within. At 120 m (390 ft) long, 80 m (260 ft) wide, and a 40 m (130 ft) tall, it is one of Central Europe's largest underground rooms.
