= Sinzing–Alling railway =

Railway line in Bavaria, Germany

History
- Opened: 20 December 1875

Technical
- Line length: 4.1 km (2.5 mi)
- Track gauge: 1,435 mm (4 ft 8 1/2 in)

The Sinzing–Alling railway in the Upper Palatine district of Regensburg was one of the shortest branch lines in Bavaria, southern Germany.

== History ==
Only a little over one year after the opening of the Regensburg–Ingolstadt railway, the Royal Bavarian State Railways opened a four-kilometre (2.5 mi) long Vizinalbahn (light branch line) on 20 December 1875 that ran from Sinzing station into the valley of the Schwarze Laber. It ended at the village of Alling, that just 35 years later – before the start of the First World War – numbered 116 inhabitants. It belonged to the rural district of Viehhausen with a population of about 800, that lay about three kilometres from the station and belonged to the Stadtamhof district office.

The numbers of railway passengers were accordingly low - three daily pairs of trains being sufficient, all of which ran to and from Regensburg Hauptbahnhof. But even by 1914 there were additional trains on Sundays and holidays for tourist traffic to the Upper Palatine Jura (Oberpfälzer Jura). During the course of the years - interrupted by various setbacks – the number of train pairs to Alling rose to nine in 1950, albeit several only went to Sinzing. Thereafter they declined again because buses were introduced running directly to Viehhausen. ON 1 March 1967 passenger services by rail ended.

Much more important for the small line was goods traffic. After all even before 1914 Alling had a filter cloth and paper factory as well as a sawmill. In addition a 600mm gauge mine railway transported brown coal until 1959 that was delivered to Viehhausen. Goods traffic continued to operate until the end of 1985.

== See also ==
- Royal Bavarian State Railways
- List of closed railway lines in Bavaria

== Sources ==
- Gerald Hoch, Andreas Kuhfahl: Nebenbahnen in der Oberpfalz. 1. Auflage. Eisenbahn-Fachbuch-Verlag Resch, Neustadt bei Coburg 2000, ISBN 3-9805967-7-X.
