= Habsberg =

Pilgrimage site in Neumarkt County, Germany

Coordinates: 49°18′48″N 11°37′55″E

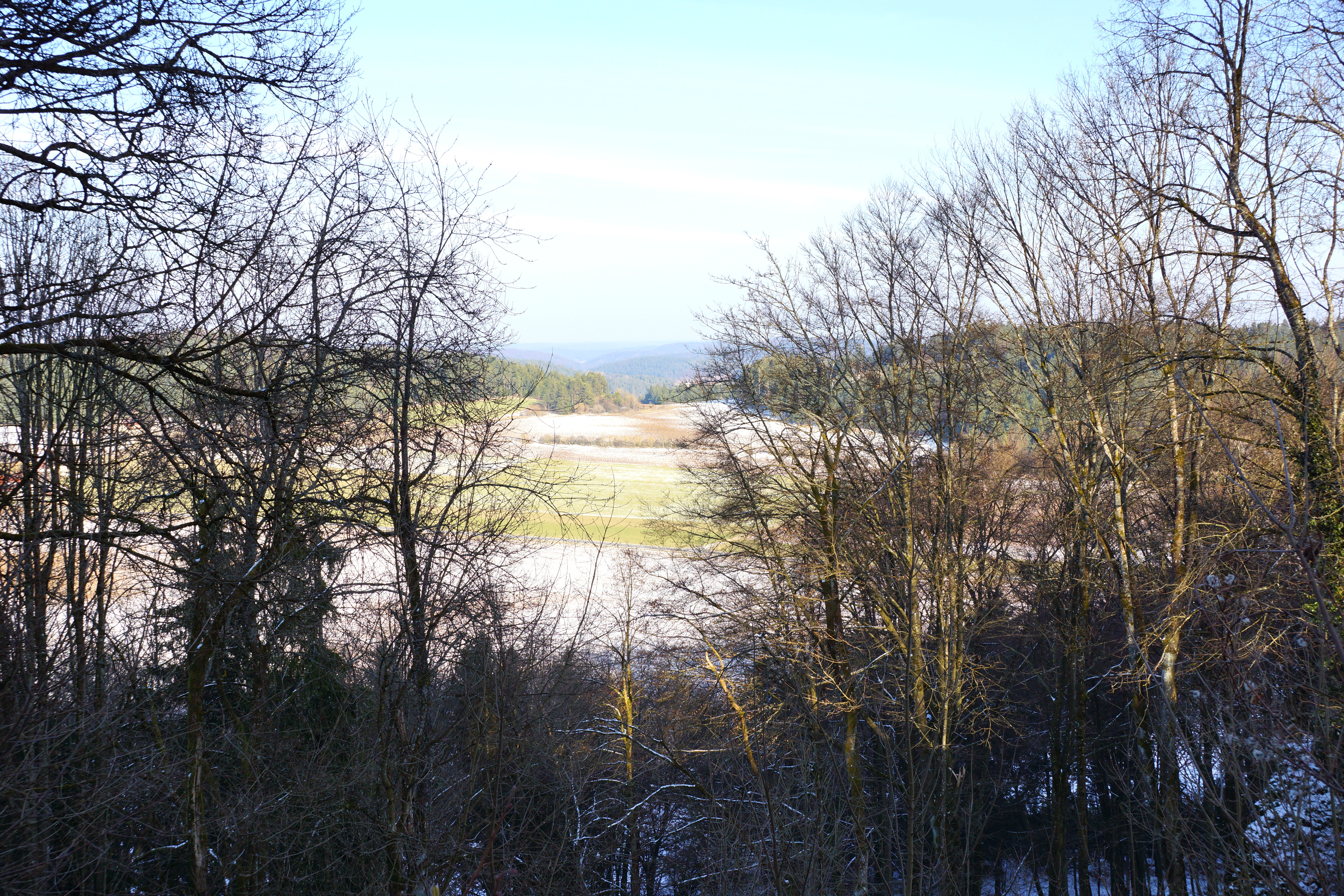
The Habsberg

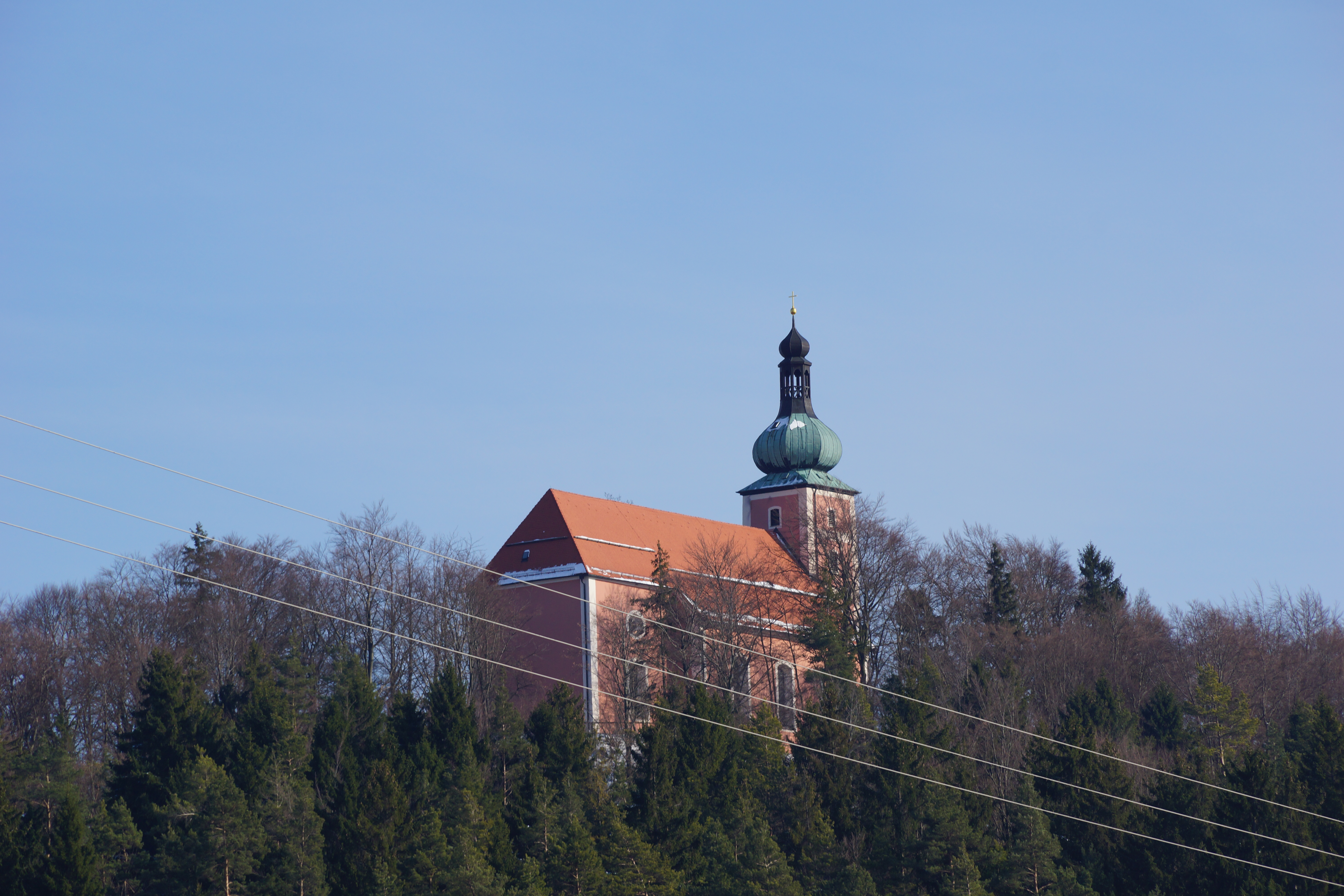
View of the pilgrimage church

The Habsberg near Velburg in the county of Neumarkt in the Upper Palatinate is a place of pilgrimage in the Oberpfalz Jura. On the mountain is the church of Our Lady of Health (Maria Heil der Kranken), a chapel of grace, and a diocesan youth house belonging to the Diocese of Eichstätt. The mountain is 621 metres high.

== History ==
In the Middle Ages there was a small castle on the Habsberg known as Habsberg Castle, of which a cistern has survived to the present day. The origin of the pilgrimage is associated with the construction of the first chapel around 1680. According to local accounts a man fell from the Helfenburg near Lengenfeld fell very ill with gout. As he prayed, he heard a voice that said to him that he should build a chapel on the Habsberg. So the estate was purchased and, in 1682, the chapel was completed.

The Habsberg became well known for being the site of several miraculous healings. As a result, in 1730 a larger chapel was built.

In 1760 the church of Our Lady of Health (Maria Heil der Kranken) was built in the rococo style. Today it is the pilgrimage church.

In 1961 a youth house was built which has been remodelled several times. Halfway up the mountain is a woodland cemetery.
