= Deusmauer Moor =

Nature reserve in Bavaria, Germany

- IUCN category IV (habitat/species management area)
- Interactive map of Deusmauer Moor
- Location: Velburg, Landkreis Neumarkt in der Oberpfalz, Bayern
- Coordinates: 49°15′24″N 11°36′53″E
- Area: 0.73289 km^{2} (0.28297 sq mi)
- Designation: NSG-00130.01
- Established: 28 June 1980 (1952)
- Administrator: County of Neumarkt in der Oberpfalz

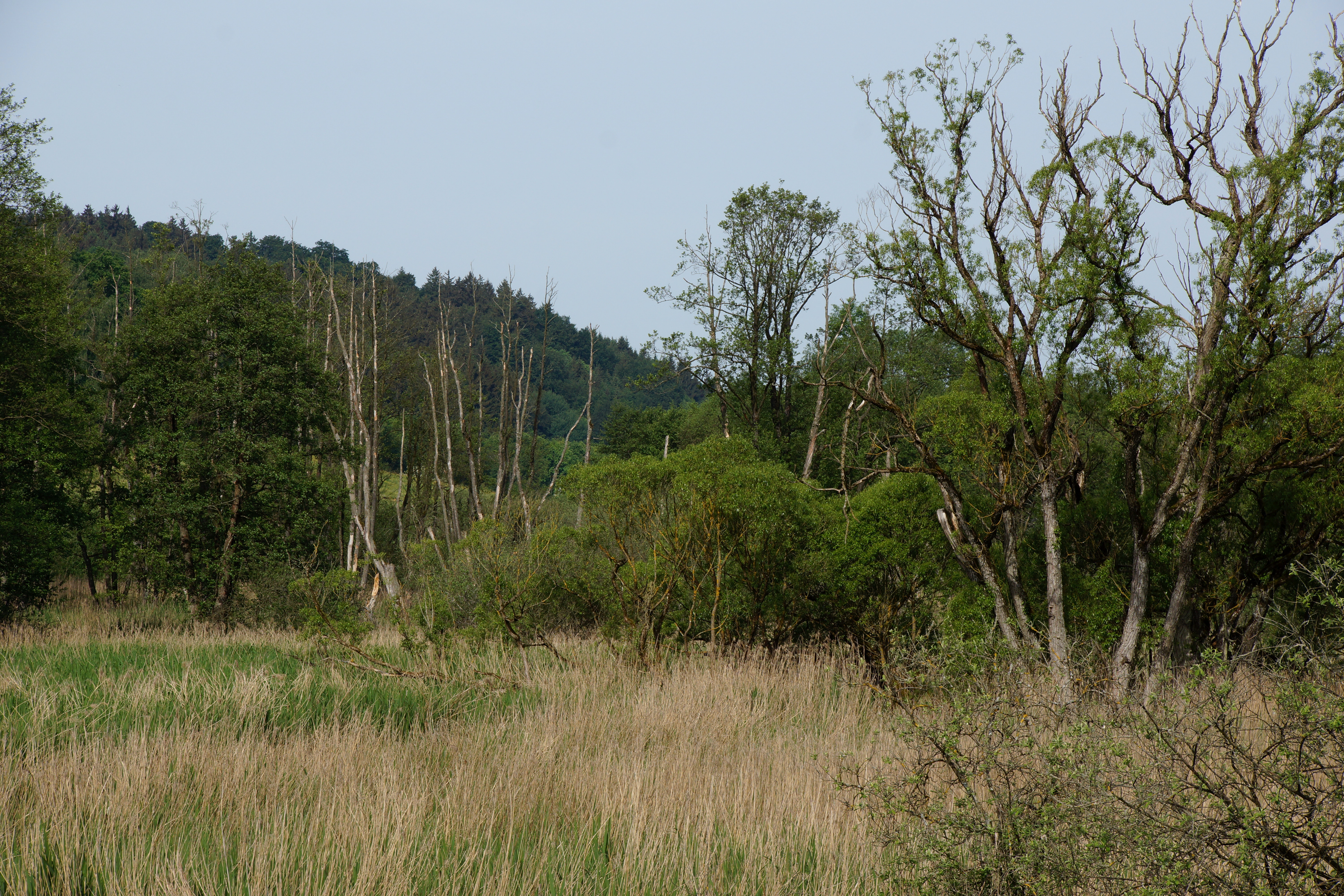

The Deusmauer Moor is a nature reserve near Deusmauer, in the municipality of Velburg in the Upper Palatine county of Neumarkt in der Oberpfalz in the German state of Bavaria.

The reserve is located 5.8 kilometres northwest of Velburg. It is part of the Special Area of Conservation called Talmoore an der Schwarzen Laaber.

The reserve covers an area of 73 hectares and is an extensive fen complex on the Schwarze Laber river. It is notable due to the presence of rare plants that are ice age relics. To preserve its characteristic wetland flora, conservation has been carried out for years. The reserve was designated in 1952 and placed under further protection by a new regulation on 28 June 1980.
