= König-Otto-Tropfsteinhöhle =

Show cave in the Neumarkt district in the Upper Palatinate in Bavaria

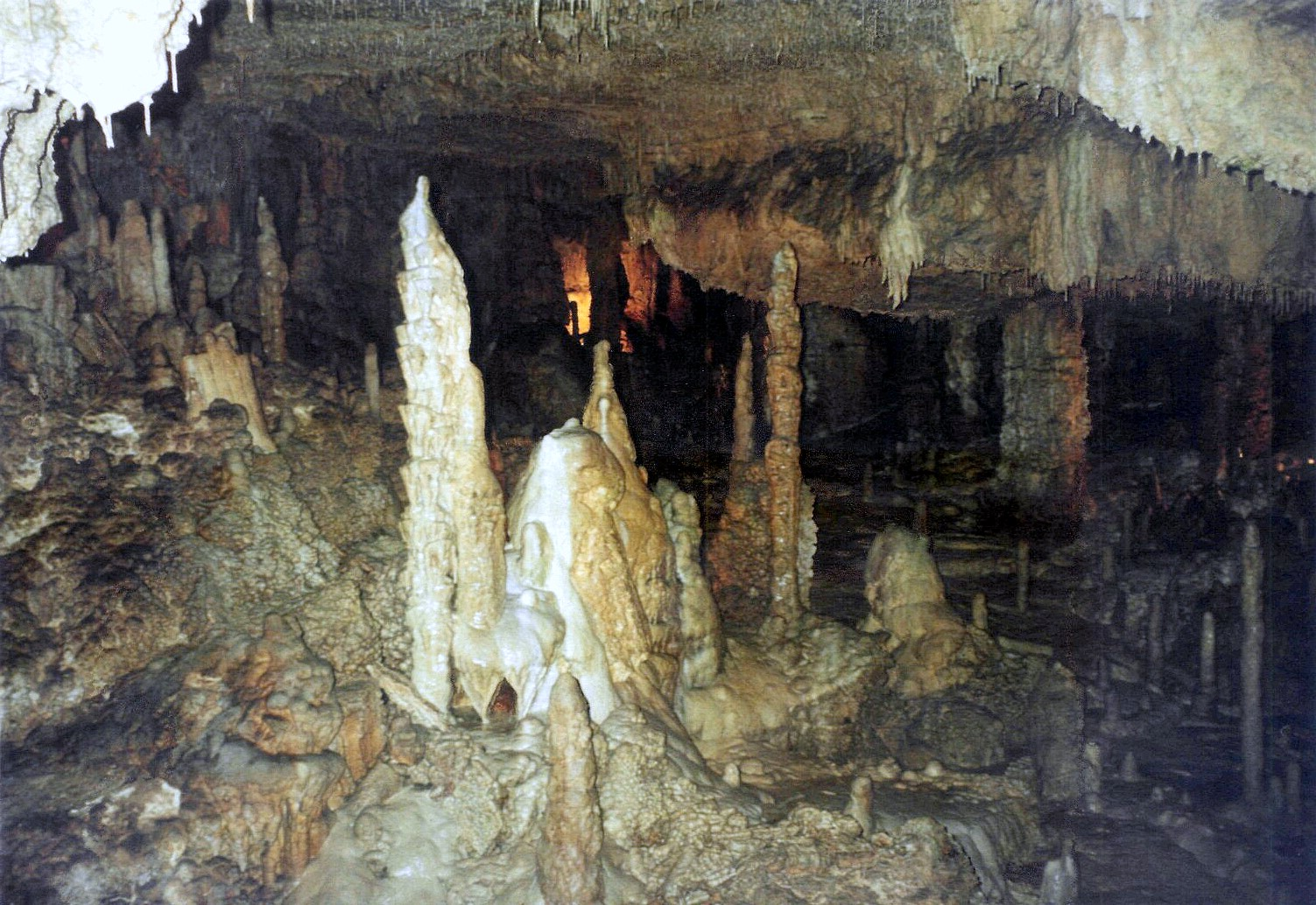
- Stalagmites in the Advent Hall

- Location within Bavaria
- Location: Upper Palatinate, Germany
- Coordinates: 49°15′17″N 11°41′24″E
- Length: 450 m (1,480 ft)
- Discovery: 1895
- Show cave opened: since 1896
- Show cave length: 270 meters
- Lighting: electric (since 1954)
- Visitors: Annual:18,200 (2007–2011), Current: 19,443 (2011)
- Translation: King Otto stalactite cave

The König-Otto-Tropfsteinhöhle (lit. English: King Otto stalactite cave) is a natural karst cave near Sankt Colomann (Velburg), a district of the Upper Palatinate town of Velburg in the southeast of the district of Neumarkt in der Oberpfalz, Bavaria, Germany.

It is considered one of the most beautiful stalactite caves in Germany. It stretches for 450 metres (1,480 ft), with approximately 270 metres (890 ft) accessible to visitors through a guided tour that takes about 30 to 40 minutes. The cave was discovered by shepherd Peter Federl on 30 September 1895, the name day of the Bavarian King Otto, hence the name. A significant addition to the cave's attractions occurred in Advent 1972 when an unknown section of the cave, known as the Advent Hall, was discovered. This part was later connected to the main cave and opened for public access. The König-Otto-Tropfsteinhöhle is part of the show caves that make up the Erlebniswelt Jurahöhle group.

== History ==
=== Discovery ===
On 30 September 1895 a shepherd named Peter Federl, living in the hamlet of Sankt Colomann, noticed a fox disappearing into the mountainside on the Bockenberg. This particular location had attracted his attention before because of the rapid snowmelt and sparse forest growth. He began by clearing a small opening and following the path taken by the fox. As he progressed, he crawled through a passage that led deeper into the mountain until he arrived in a wide, shallow cave. However, without a source of light, he was hesitant to venture further.

Federl's curiosity led him to seek assistance from two individuals, namely Josef Erl, a master chimney sweep, and Josef Kuhn, a master mechanic from Velburg, for further explorations of the cave. The three men discovered a beautiful stalactite cave with many different white stalactite formations by candlelight on 30 September 1895. Their explorations unveiled a series of underground chambers, many of which required crawling or stooping to enter because of their narrow passages. The cave was discovered on the name day of the Bavarian King Otto, so the cave was named after him.

The news of the cave's discovery spread quickly, and it was not long before the Velburg Tourist and Beautification Association recognized the potential of this dripstone cave as a significant regional attraction. In the next eight months, the pathways were extended and deepened to allow for easier exploration. By May 1896, just a short time after the cave's discovery, the first visitors could be guided through the cave. These guided tours were conducted solely by candlelight, torches, or magnesium lamps and continued in this manner until 1954.

=== Expansion to show cave ===
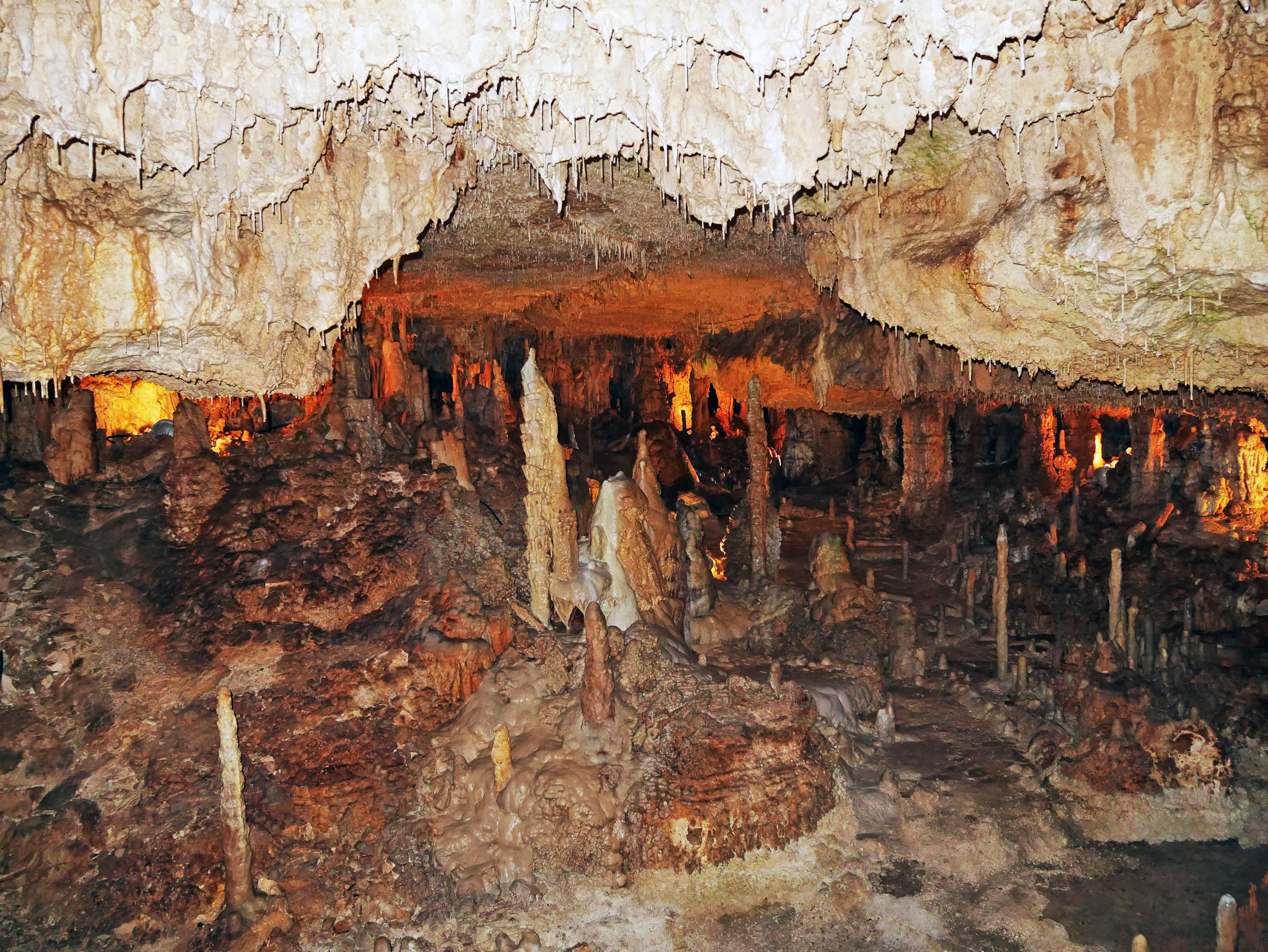
Sinter wall

Over the years, the Velburg Tourist Association continued to operate and maintain the show cave, solidifying its place among the noteworthy show caves. In the 1930s, various enhancements were made to facilitate guided tours, including the installation of a wooden staircase and other necessary amenities. However, in 1951, a significant threat loomed over the cave's existence. It was within an area slated for redevelopment as part of the Hohenfels military training area. To safeguard the cave from potential damage, its owners decided to brick up its entrances as a precautionary measure. When it became evident that the cave would remain outside the military training area, it was promptly reopened to the public.

In 1952, the Velburg Tourist Association took a lease on the cave and embarked on a two-year renovation effort. During this period, the pathways were further developed, and permanent steps were installed. In 1953, the cave was once again reopened to visitors, this time with the addition of electric lighting, eliminating the need for torches that had been detrimental to the stalactites. The installation of electric illumination was completed in 1954, and the first regular guided tours began that year, led by Hans Federl, the son of the cave's discoverer.

=== Advent Hall ===
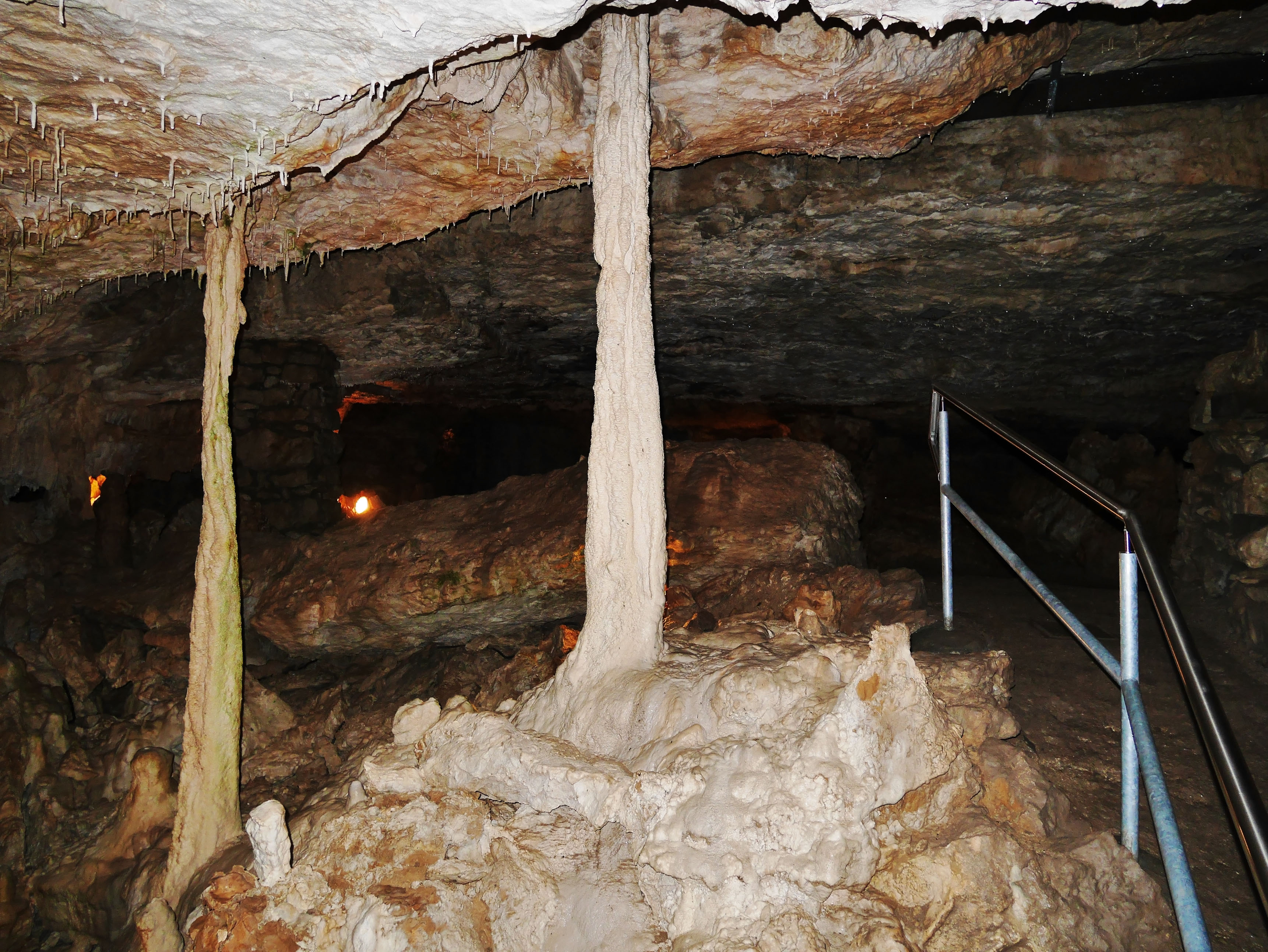
Stalagnates in the Advent Hall

In August 1968, a 17-year-old named Helmut Schlierf, who had first visited the cave two years earlier with his parents and had developed a deep fascination for it, teamed up with his friend Michael Kirnberger to explore the cave further. Hans Wieser, the cave guide, permitted them to explore the cave at their leisure to search for new passages.

Their explorations led to a significant discovery by 19 October 1969, when they uncovered a crevice. They began digging it out in May 1970, a process that continued through March 1971. The two explorers encountered Forschungsgruppe Höhle und Karst Franken (FHKF), a caving research group during this time. Members of this group joined in the digging efforts on 11 May 1972. The pivotal moment came on 2 December 1972, when, with the assistance of numerous helpers and powerful equipment, they managed to crush a large block that had obstructed their path. Schlierf, the discoverer of the crevice, was the first to crawl through it and enter a small chamber. Following him, the other cavers ascended a slope through a narrow passage, eventually reaching what would later be known as the Advent Hall—a spacious, hall-like grotto adorned with various stalactite formations. The discovery of this new section of the cave occurred during Advent, which inspired the explorers to name it the Advent Hall. In total, seven individuals played a role in this discovery.

Following the discovery of the Advent Hall, surveying of the new chambers commenced on 3 December 1972, and was completed by March 1973. Subsequent exterior surveying efforts continued in the following years. In autumn and winter of 1976-77, a tunnel was excavated into the Advent Hall from the north side of the Bockenberg after previous test drilling. Simultaneously, older installations were renovated and improved. In 1976, a gallery near the Erlhain was excavated, and another tunnel was built, connecting the old cave to the Advent Hall.

During the development work on the Advent Hall, it was heavily modified and partially destroyed. A concrete bridge with steel pipe railings was built over a large sinter pool, and dripstones that obstructed the path were removed. Additionally, the once-white nodule sinter was partially soiled and trampled during these activities. The sinter pool itself nearly dried up during the development work, leading to considerable changes in the cave's appearance. On 3 June 1977, the Advent Hall was officially opened to visitor traffic.

== Description ==
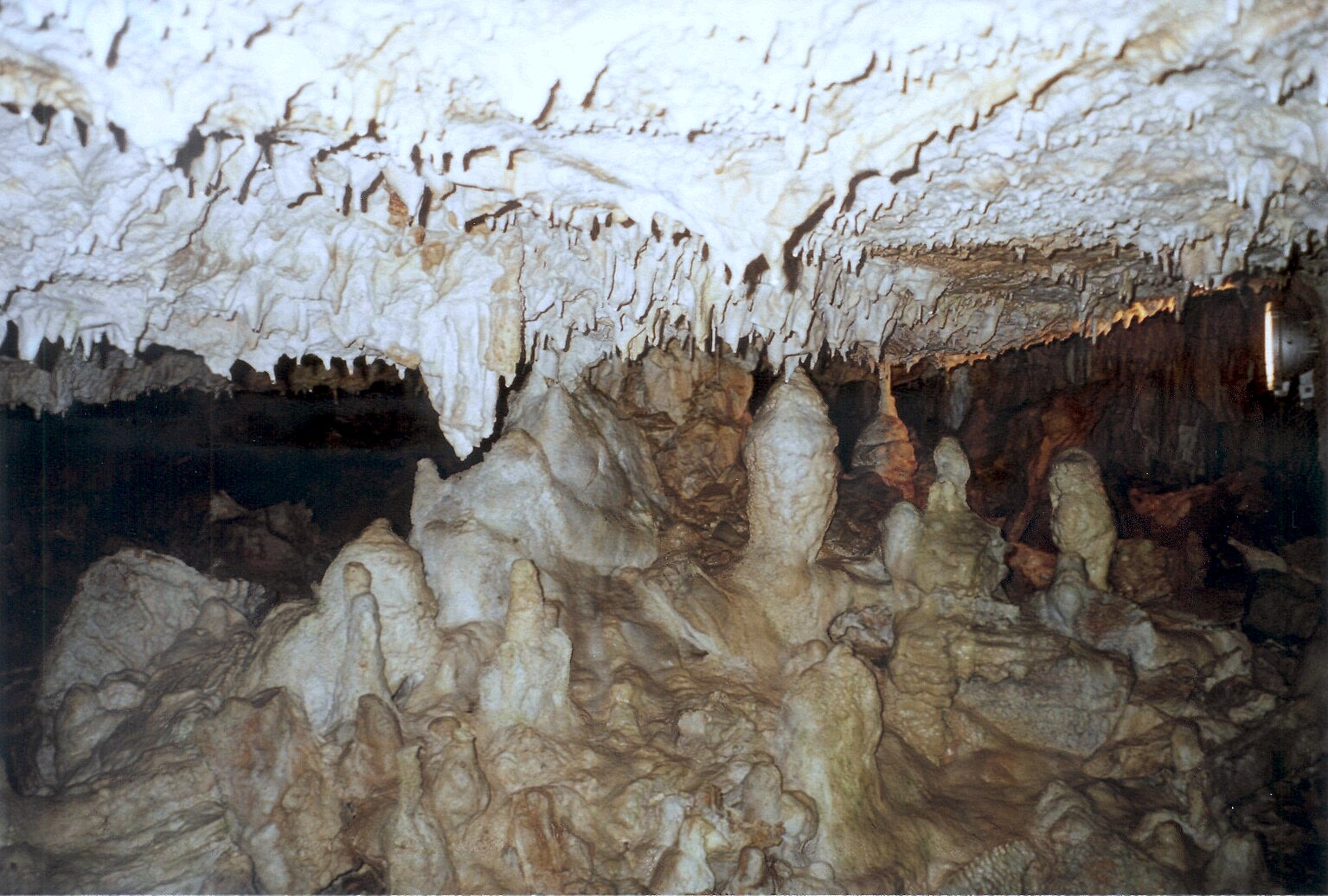
Stalactite formations

The interior of the cave is accessed by 47 steps that descend to the Federl Cave. This initial chamber is named after the cave's first discoverer. From the Federl Cave, a narrow passage continues into the King's Grotto. The passage, carved into the rock, features a low ceiling adorned with substantial sinter columns that appear as if they have been broken off. The King's Grotto derives its name from King Otto, in honor of whom the cave was named.

Within the cave, various parts have been named in recognition of the individuals who played a role in its discovery and development. Additionally, some sections are named based on the appearance of the dripstone formations they contain. King's Grotto, for instance, is a chamber that rises irregularly to a height of eight to ten meters. Within this grotto, there are numerous low, hood-shaped stalagmites. These distinct stalactite formations have been given names such as "Buddha", "Castle", and "Hermits".

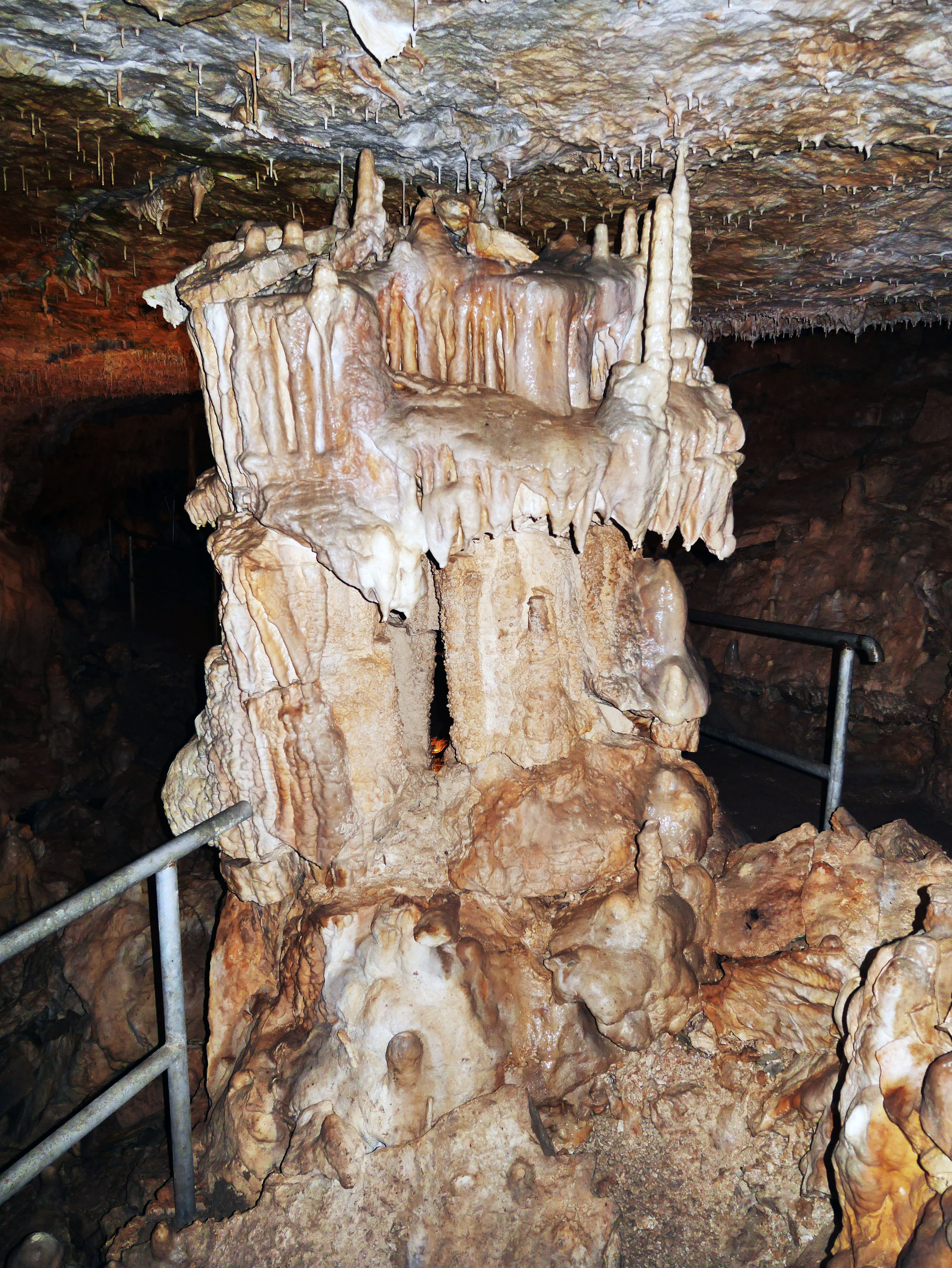
Large sinter formation

The path leads past a large stalagmite and over a rocky ridge into the Niederwaldgrotte. This chamber is only about the height of a man. It is adorned with numerous sinter tubes hanging from the ceiling, displaying various colors due to their different mineral compositions. Many of these sinter tubes are filled with water, which drips onto the stalagmites below, contributing to their growth. However, some areas in this part of the cave are quite dry, indicating variations in water flow. This is also a sign that precipitation seeps into the cave to different extents. A passage that was excavated in 1976 in this section of the cave reveals how the cave has become overgrown with formations over the centuries. In the Niederwald grotto there is a niche called the "treasure chamber". In this niche, water collects in a small basin lined with sintered material at the edges. Within this pool of water, stalagmites of varying sizes rise, resembling small islands, some looking like capped mushrooms or little hats. This pool of water always remains full. The stalactites in the cave are dark or black. This is because the cave used to be explored with torches that produced soot. Since the introduction of electric lighting, white sinter deposits have begun to form in many areas once again.

At a new passage is the Erl Grove, named after the co-discoverer, Josef Erl. The limestone vault here is grand and is supported by columns resembling a "fairy forest". These columns, referred to as stalagnates, are formed by stalactites and stalagmites growing together and give the appearance of a forest with gnarled oak trunks. Within this collection is a stalactite formation known as the "Lovers". In a showcase within this area, the bones of cave bears are on display. Afterwards, the visitor goes up a staircase and through a 70-metre (230 ft) passage to the Cow Cave, named after another co-discoverer, Josef Kuhn. Near the entrance of the passage, on the right side, is the old cave exit. Here, there are extensive sinter formations resembling solidified cascades. Towards the bottom, a stalactite formation resembles a dinosaur. Further down, the view falls into the Grape Chamber, where pearl-like stalactites once grew underwater. However, this part of the cave has since dried up.

Visitors embark on a journey through an extensive long corridor, in which fracture zones can be seen. This passage eventually leads to the Advent Hall, discovered in 1972, which is one of the most beautiful cave rooms in the Franconian Alb. Even in the vestibule preceding the Advent Hall, visitors are struck by the contrast between the gleaming white stalactites and the nearly black formations found in the older sections of the cave. Torches were never used in the Advent Hall, so the formations were not blackened by soot. On the floor there are large stone blocks originating from former ceiling collapses. On the fallen ceiling parts, there are already rich stalactite formations. These fragments are often already sintered together.

From here a few steps lead to the actual Advent Hall, a hall-like grotto with an abundance of stalactites in a diverse array of forms and hues. The walls are adorned with colored sinter beads, evidence that the cave was underwater for a substantial period. Notably, water level lines of varying heights provide a visual record of water levels experienced by the cave over time. Countless sinter tubes with water droplets protrude from the ceiling. Also striking are sawtooth-like sinter plumes and small spiral-shaped stalactites. There are also some stalagnates several meters in height. Departing from the Advent Hall, visitors go through a brief corridor with two doors ultimately leading to the artificial exit.

== Geology ==
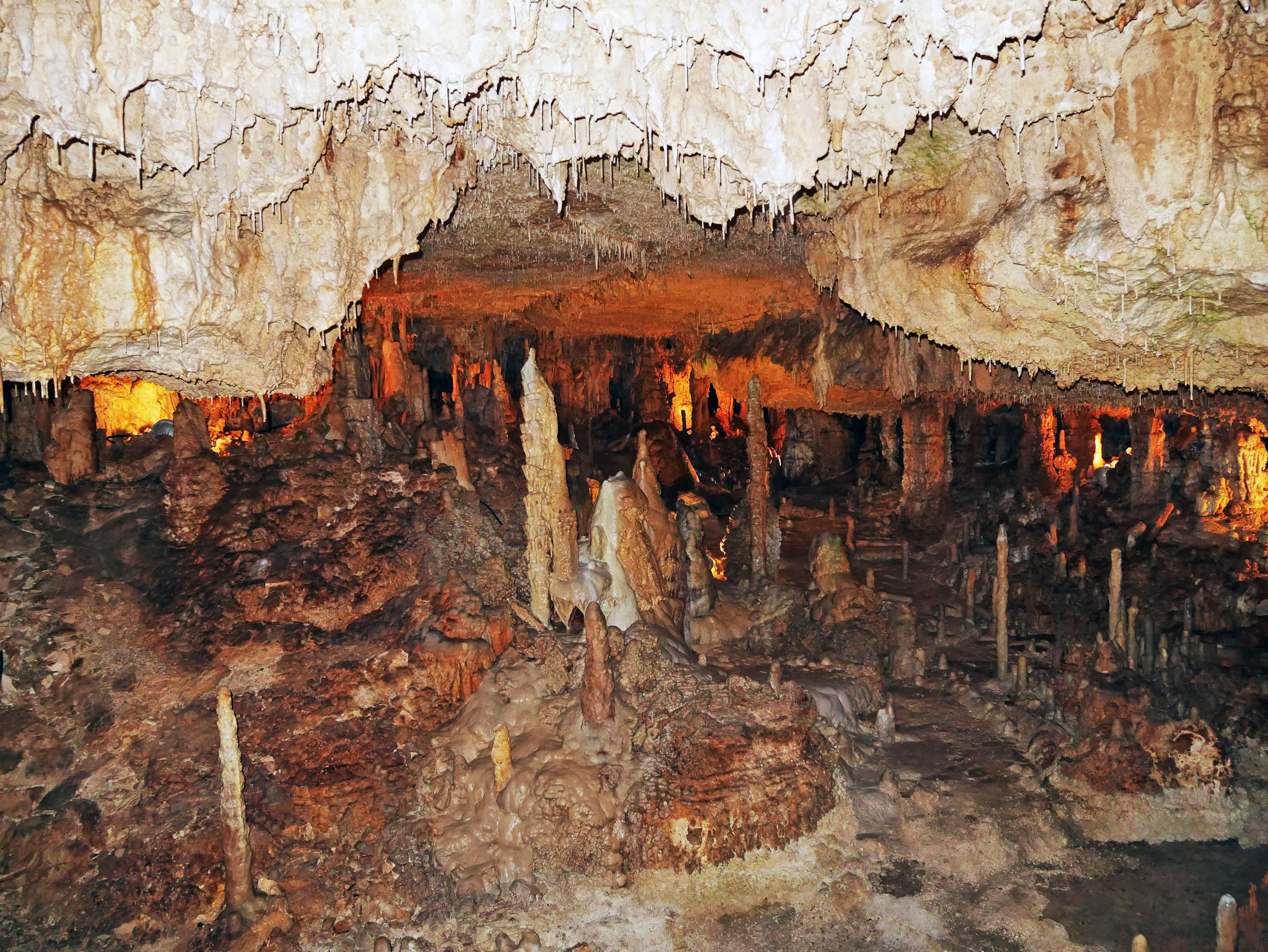
Stalactites and stalagmites

The cave is within the geological formation of the Frankendolomite, especially in the Malm stage of the Jurassic period. It can be classified as a type of hall cave. It lies predominantly parallel to the slope, running north–south, facilitating the present exit in the Advent Hall. Within the cave are several large chambers. The largest is the Advent Hall, with an impressive ceiling of almost ten meters. Following closely in size is the King's Grotto, the second largest room. Several excavations in the King's Grotto failed to reach the true floor at any point. The sinter layers exposed in the profile are 1.8 metres (5 ft 11 in) thick and continue downwards. These profiles contain ancient generations of dripstones, the largest stalagmite reaching a height of about 0.7 metres (2 ft 4 in). The Versturzberg was formed by at least two to three slab collapses. These collapses extend to the ground surface, although the terrain over-formation no longer indicates a collapse.

=== Geotope ===
The cave is designated by the Bavarian State Office for the Environment as Geotope 373H001.

== Tourism ==
=== Tourist development ===
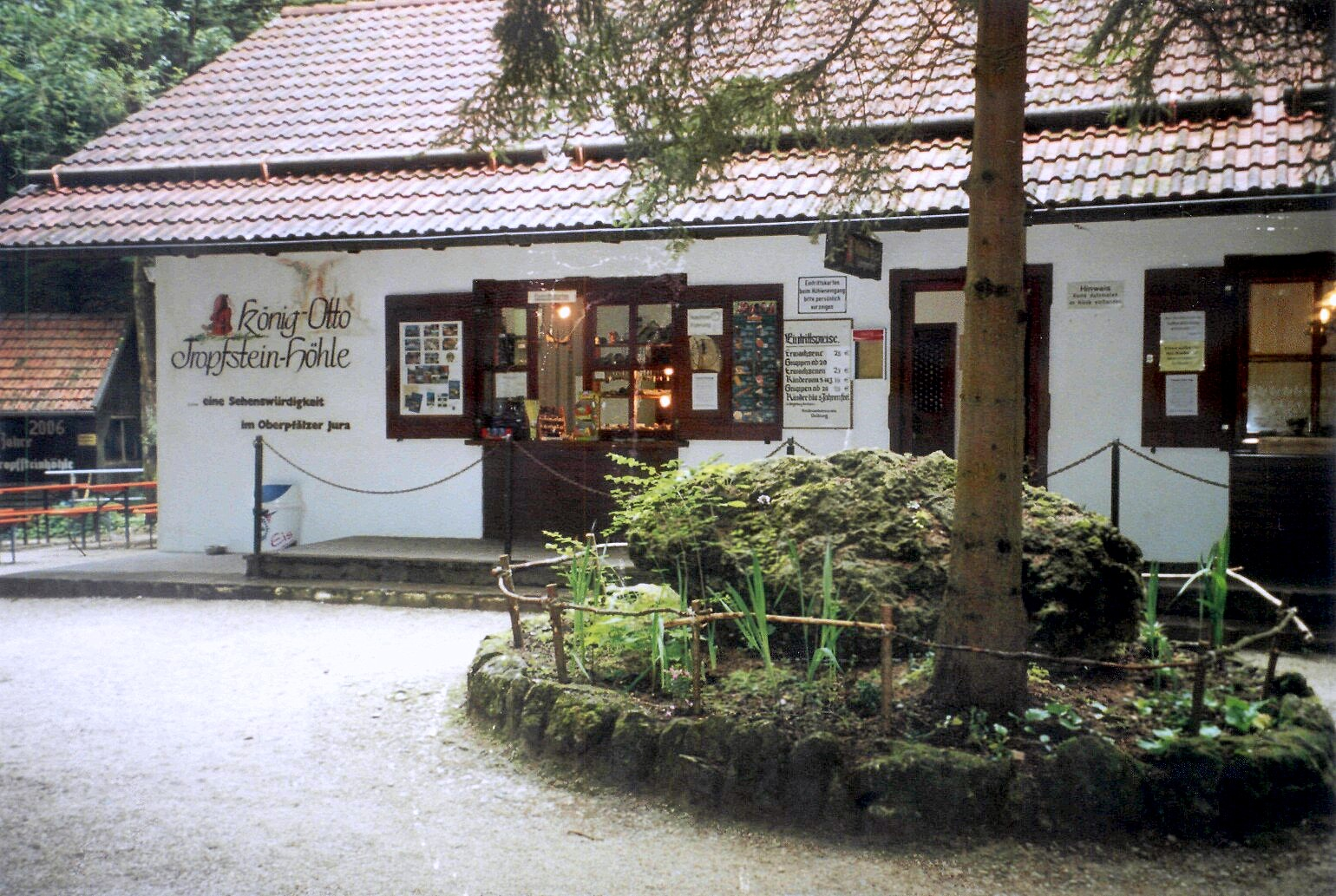
Cave buildings

From April to October, regular guided tours take place via easily accessible paths with staircases to the individual chambers and stalactite formations. In the winter months, from November to March, guided tours are available only by appointment for groups of 20 or more. From the exit of the cave, a forest nature trail leads back to the cave's main building.

=== Visitor numbers ===
The King Otto Stalactite Cave has played a significant role in regional tourism since its discovery. However, its visitor numbers have consistently trailed behind those of the Devil's Cave, ranking just ahead of the Bing Cave and the Sophia Cave in terms of attendance. Nevertheless, the King Otto Stalactite Cave receives more visitors than Maximilian's Grotto and the Easter Cave. The peak in visitor numbers occurred in 1989, with 31,955 visitors. Subsequently, attendance figures gradually declined, hovering just below the 25,000 mark. In 2004, there was a temporary resurgence, with 25,170 visitors. However, in 2006, the number of visitors dropped below 20,000 for the first time, reaching 19,658. The lowest point in recent years was in 2008, with only 15,977 visitors. In 2009, attendance increased to 17,034, followed by 18,392 visitors in 2010 and 19,443 in 2011. Between 1989 and 1993, the cave experienced its highest five-year average, with 31,000 visitors. In 2009, the millionth visitor toured the cave. From 2007 to 2011, the average number of visitors was 18,177.

== See also ==
- List of show caves in Germany
