= Streptomyces boninensis =

Scientific classification
- Domain: Bacteria
- Kingdom: Bacillati
- Phylum: Actinomycetota
- Class: Actinomycetia
- Order: Streptomycetales
- Family: Streptomycetaceae
- Genus: Streptomyces
- Species: S. boninensis

Binomial name
- Streptomyces boninensis Také et al. 2018

Species of bacterium

Streptomyces boninensis is a bacterium species from the genus Streptomyces which has been isolated from soil from a limestone cave from the Ogasawara Islands in Japan.

== See also ==
- List of Streptomyces species
