= Schwarze Laber =

River in Germany

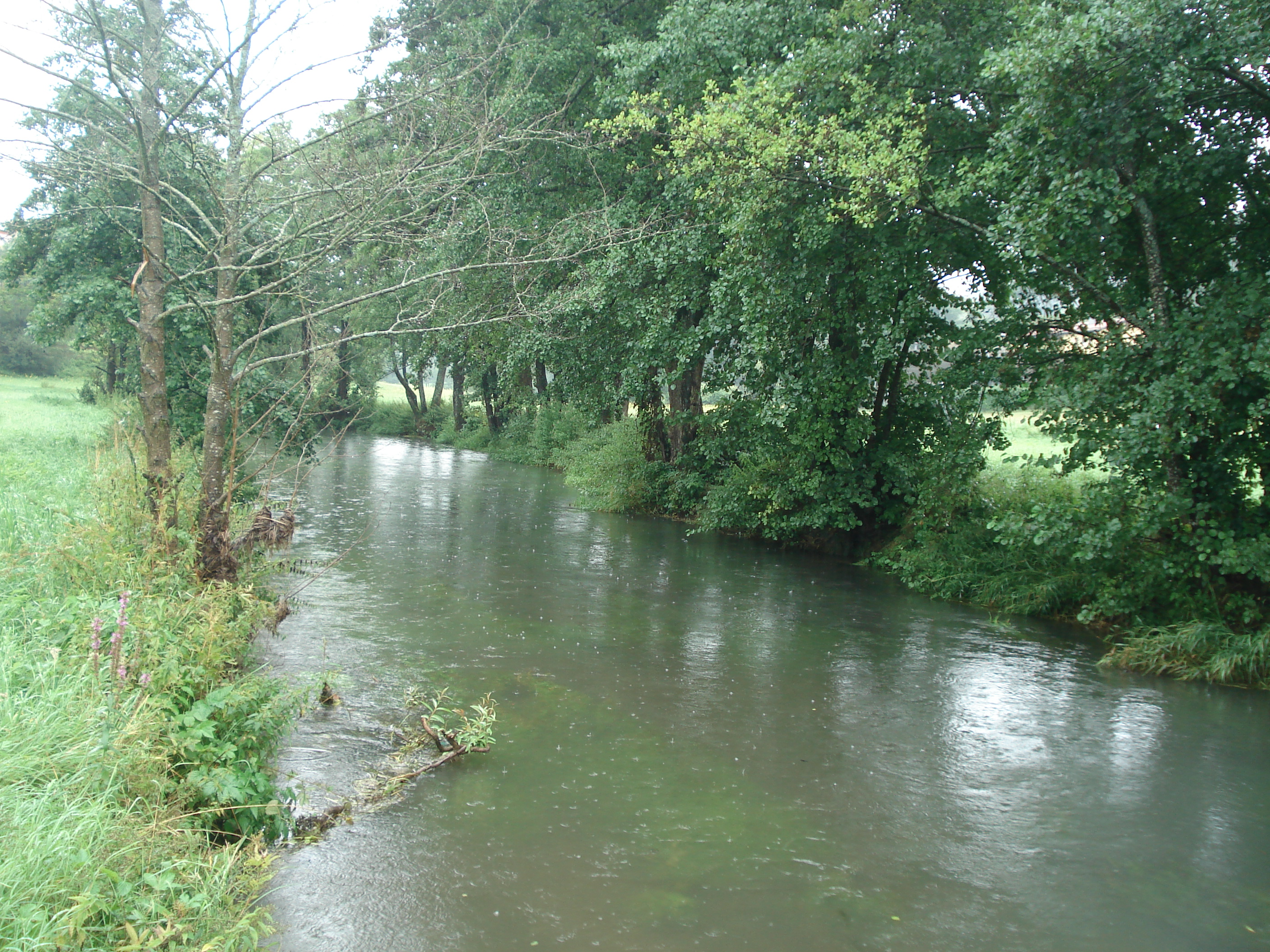
- The Schwarze Laber at Parsberg

Location
- Country: Germany
- State: Bavaria

Physical characteristics
- Source
  - location: Bavarian Jura
- Mouth
  - location: Danube
  - coordinates: 48°59′46″N 12°2′29″E
- Length: 77.7 km (48.3 mi)
- Basin size: 468 km^{2} (181 sq mi)

Basin features
- Progression: Danube→ Black Sea

The Schwarze Laber (German pronunciation: [ˈʃvaʁtsə ˈlaːbɐ], lit. 'Black Laber') is a river in Bavaria, Germany, and a left tributary of the Danube. Its source is near Neumarkt in der Oberpfalz. It is approx. 78 km long. It flows southeast through the small towns Parsberg, Beratzhausen, Laaber and Deuerling. It flows into the Danube in Sinzing.
