= Cuevas de Sorbas =

Coordinates: 37.0921°N 2.1074°W

Cuevas de Sorbas are gypsum caves frequented by tourists in Sorbas in Almeria, Spain. The formations are 6 million years old and consist of karst in gypsum rock.
