= Hotel zur Post (Velburg) =

Hotel in Velburg, Germany

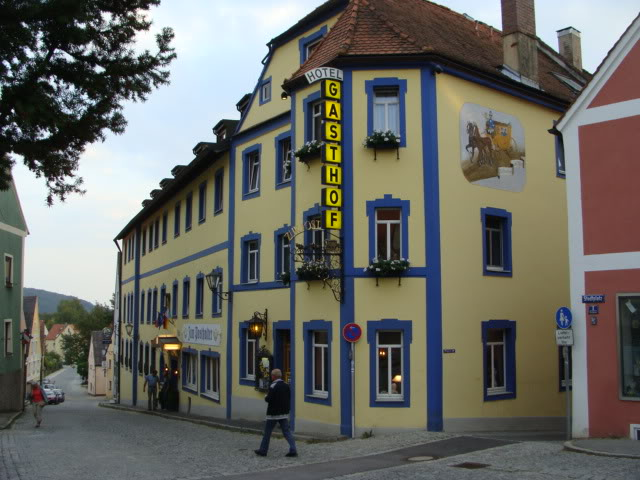
- Hotel zur Post Velburg

General information
- Location: Velburg, Bavaria, Germany
- Owner: Richard Stigler

Website
- Hotel zur Post Website

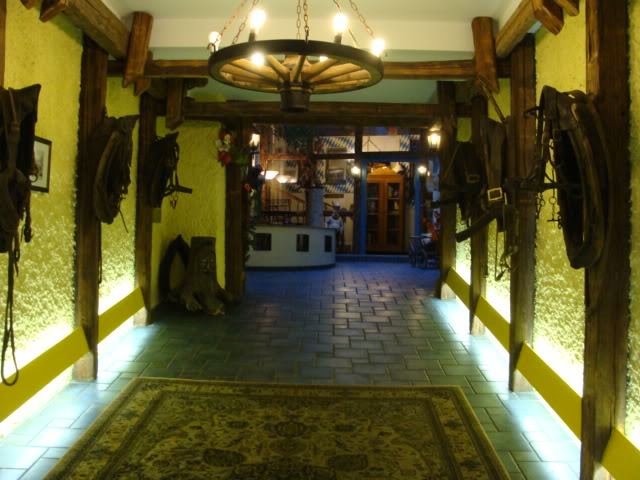
Hotel zur Post Interior

Hotel zur Post is the largest hotel in the vacation town of Velburg, Germany.

== History ==
Hotel zur Post was once known as the "Cross Landlord" until it was purchased by Joseph Glossner in 1907 and renamed.

Glossner was named Keeper of a Post Station in the order of Thurn und Taxis and conducted a stage service to Parsberg and Seubersdorf. In 1923, the stage service was replaced by a bus.

The post office was located in the hotel until 1966.

Richard Stigler married into the Glossner family and took over operation of the hotel in 1990. In 2009, Richard's son, also named Richard, took over operation of the hotel.
