= Gaststätte Röhrl =

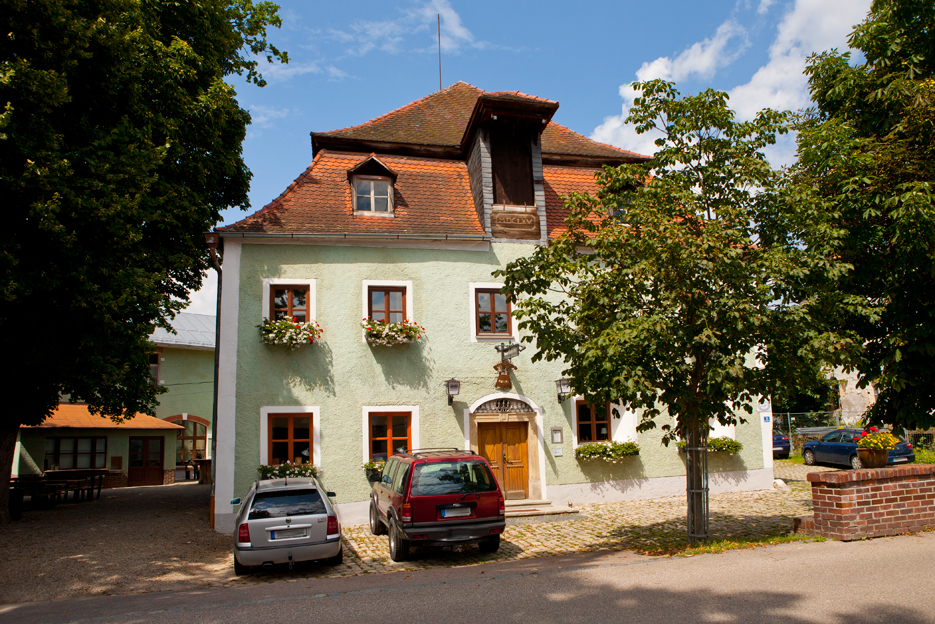
Gaststätte Röhrl in Eilsbrunn (main building)

The Gaststätte Röhrl (Röhrl restaurant) is a restaurant with beer garden in Eilsbrunn in the district of Regensburg, Germany. Since 1658 it is continuously operated and owned by the Röhrl family.

In November 2010 the Guinness Book of Records introduced the restaurant as the oldest continuously operated restaurant in the world, conducting business for more than three and half centuries.

== Location and property ==
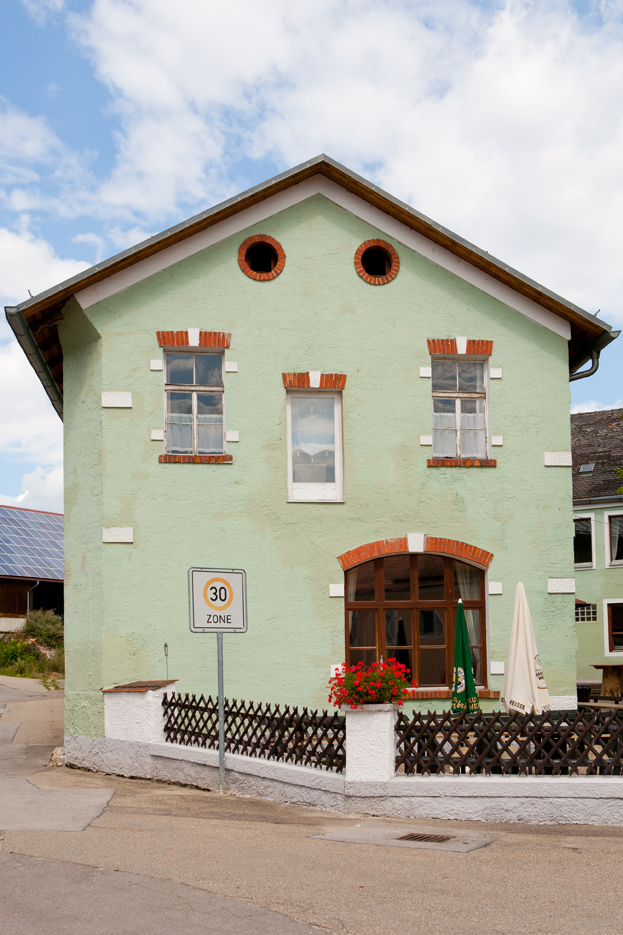
Festival hall ("Festsaal"), western side

The restaurant is located on the western edge of Eilsbrunn, opposite the parish church of St. Wolfgang.

The oldest part of the restaurant, the main building is a two-storey building with garett hip roof and the taproom behind segmental arch windows on the ground floor. This component was built before 1800, maybe early as 1665 as the inscription MDCLXV suggests. Approximately 50 guests can be accommodated; the decor is simple and largely obtained in the first half of the 20th century according to their time of origin. Above the entrance stands a large dormer with a pulley from the roof.

A two-storey gabled roof construction from 1839 connects to the main building. In the early 20th century another saddleback roof building for a festival hall with space for 250 guests was erected; the Art Nouveau door at the entrance to the old building was originally part of this component. The beer garden hosts further 400 guests.

The property is under conservation.

== History ==
The restaurant is operated in the eleventh generation by members of the family Röhrl.

In 1658 the family got the restaurant by marriage of Andreas Röhrl (app. 1636–1706) with Susanna Hofmeister, the innkeeper Georg Hofmeister's daughter. Röhrl was henceforth brewer and landlord of Eilsbrunn. Married twice he left the business to his son Joachim (1676–1737). The year MDCLXV on the entrance facade suggests that a conversion or new construction of the property was done in 1665. After the death of the fifth Röhrl male in a row, his widow took over the business. In 1839 she reconstructed the building and set up an extension. She later bequeathed the property to her youngest son. A picture in the guest room shows her grandson and successor to her son Johann Nepomuk Röhrl. The opening of the nearby railroad made the area a popular tourist destination for visitors even from other parts of Germany, so that a large festival hall and guest rooms (now discontinued) were erected.

After the death of another Johann Nepomuk Röhrl, taking over the inn after World War II, the daughter Antonie Kolbe took over the Gaststätte Röhrl. In 1971 the brewery was shut down. Since 2006 the inn is directed by her nephew Muk Röhrl, a skilled cook and businessman.

Today the beer sold in the restaurant is mainly produced by the Röhrl brewery in Straubing. This brewery was founded by Josef Röhrl, the first Johann Nepomuk's brother, in 1881.

== Literature ==
- Karl Gattinger: Der Röhrlwirt in Eilsbrunn. In: Bayerisches Staatsministerium für Wissenschaft, Forschung und Kunst: Genuss mit Geschichte. Einkehr in bayerischen Denkmälern – Gasthöfe, Wirtshäuser und Weinstuben, 2. Auflage, Volk Verlag, Munich 2009, ISBN 978-3-937200-70-5, p. 95–97 (German)
