= Velburg =

- Town
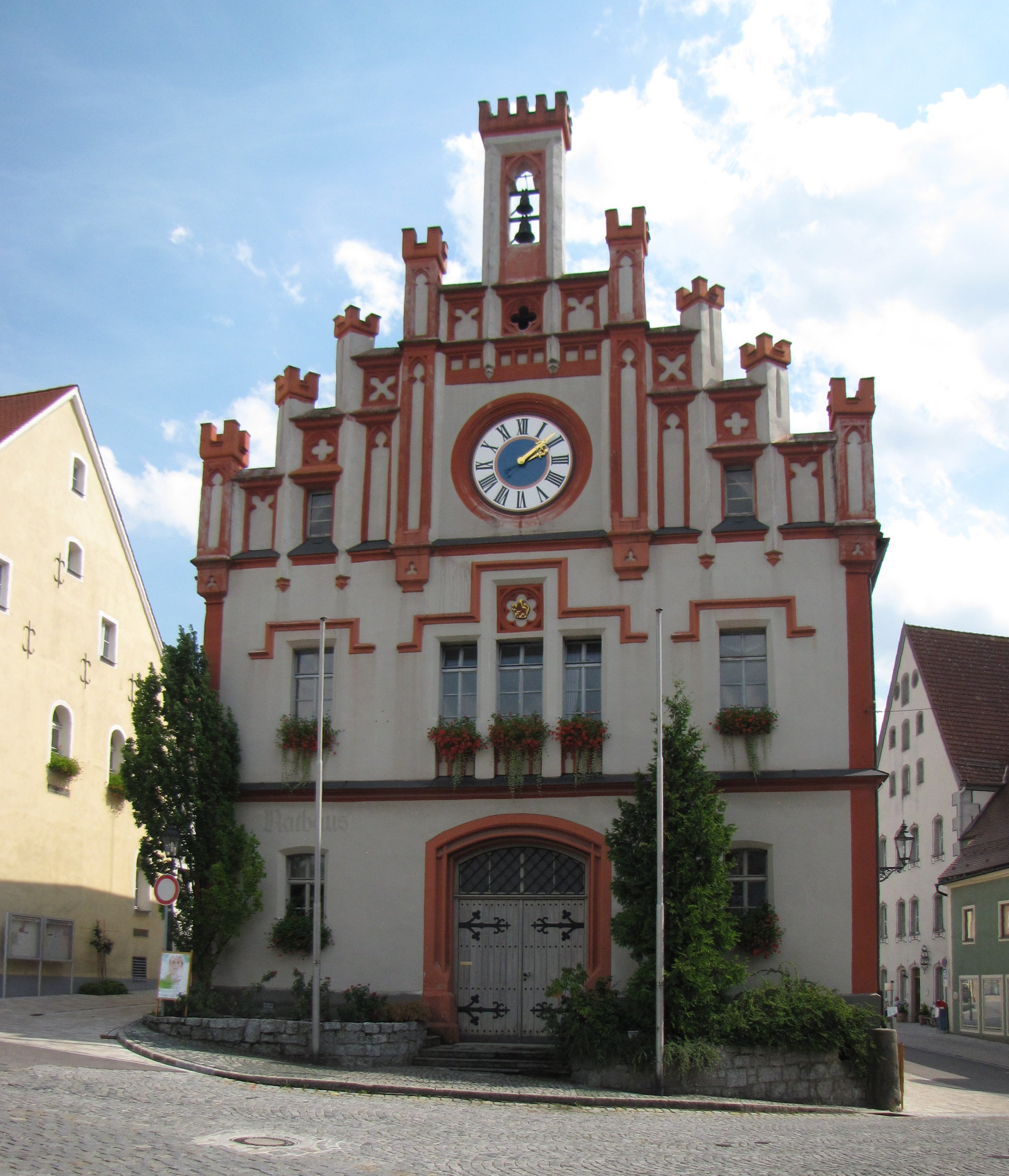
- Town hall

- Coat of arms

- Location of Velburg within Neumarkt in der Oberpfalz district
- Interactive map of Velburg
- Location within Germany Location within Bavaria
- Coordinates: 49°13′58″N 11°40′19″E
- Country: Germany
- State: Bavaria
- Admin. region: Oberpfalz
- District: Neumarkt in der Oberpfalz
- Subdivisions: 7 Ortsteile

Government
  - Mayor (2020–26): Christian Schmid (CSU)

Area
  - Total: 175.66 km^{2} (67.82 sq mi)
- Elevation: 492 m (1,614 ft)

Population (2025-12-31)
  - Total: 5,457
  - Density: 31.07/km^{2} (80.46/sq mi)
- Time zone: UTC+01:00 (CET)
  - Summer (DST): UTC+02:00 (CEST)
- Postal codes: 92355
- Dialling codes: 09182
- Vehicle registration: NM
- Website: www.velburg.de

Velburg (German pronunciation: [ˈfɛlbʊʁk]) is a town in the district of Neumarkt in Bavaria, Germany. It is situated 17 km southeast of Neumarkt in der Oberpfalz, and 39 km northwest of Regensburg.

== Castle ==
The town of Velburg has a castle ruin which occupies the highest point of land. The castle is triangular in outline, with a central keep which is nearly intact, having been partly restored. The castle stands at a height of 621.5 metres above sea level and was initially constructed in 1129. The castle was captured and damaged in 1633 during the Thirty Years War after which it was abandoned. The town bought the castle in 1793, and many attempts were made to restore it, with the most successful attempt being in 1986, which was the last restoration to date.

== Trails ==
Velburg is located in a scenic area with many walking trails, including the eastern portion of the Main-Danube Trail.

== Accommodation ==
Accommodation in the Velburg village include the historic Hotel zur Post.

== Culture and sights ==
- Ruins of Velburg Castle
- Ruins of Helfenberg Castle
- Ruins of Adelburg Castle near Hollerstetten
- Pilgrimage church of Habsberg, St. Mary, Health of the Sick (Maria Heil der Kranken)
- Parish church of the Birth of the Virgin Mary (St. Mariä Geburt) in Oberweiling
- Town church of St. John the Baptist, three-aisled church whose oldest elements date to the 13th century.
- Pilgrimage church of St. Wolfgang, late Gothic church and formerly an important pilgrimage site for the Regensburg bishop St. Wolfgang
- Pilgrimage church of the Sacred Heart (1770/1792) with hermitage, the only Sacred Heart pilgrimage church in Bavaria
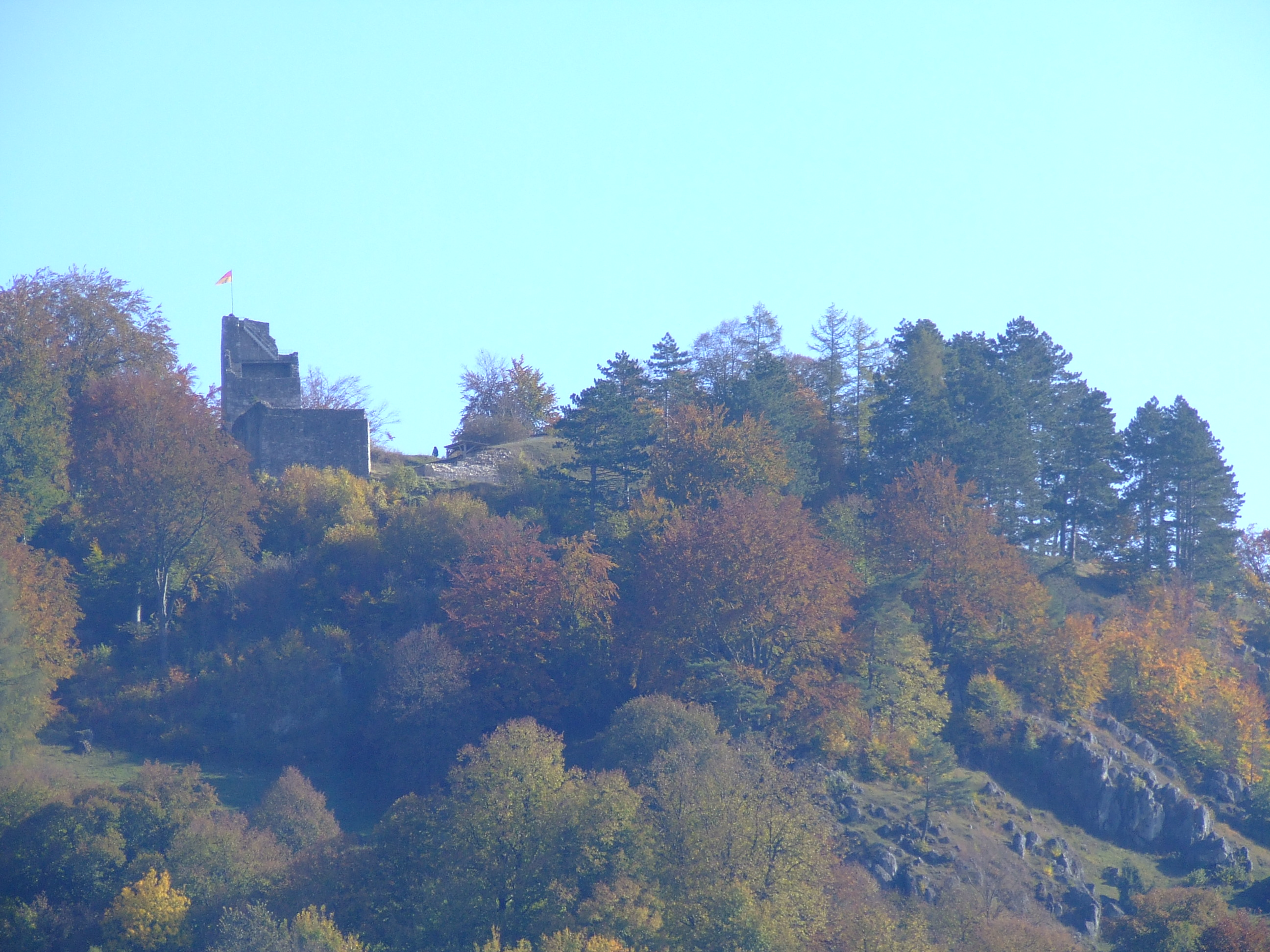
Velburg castle ruins

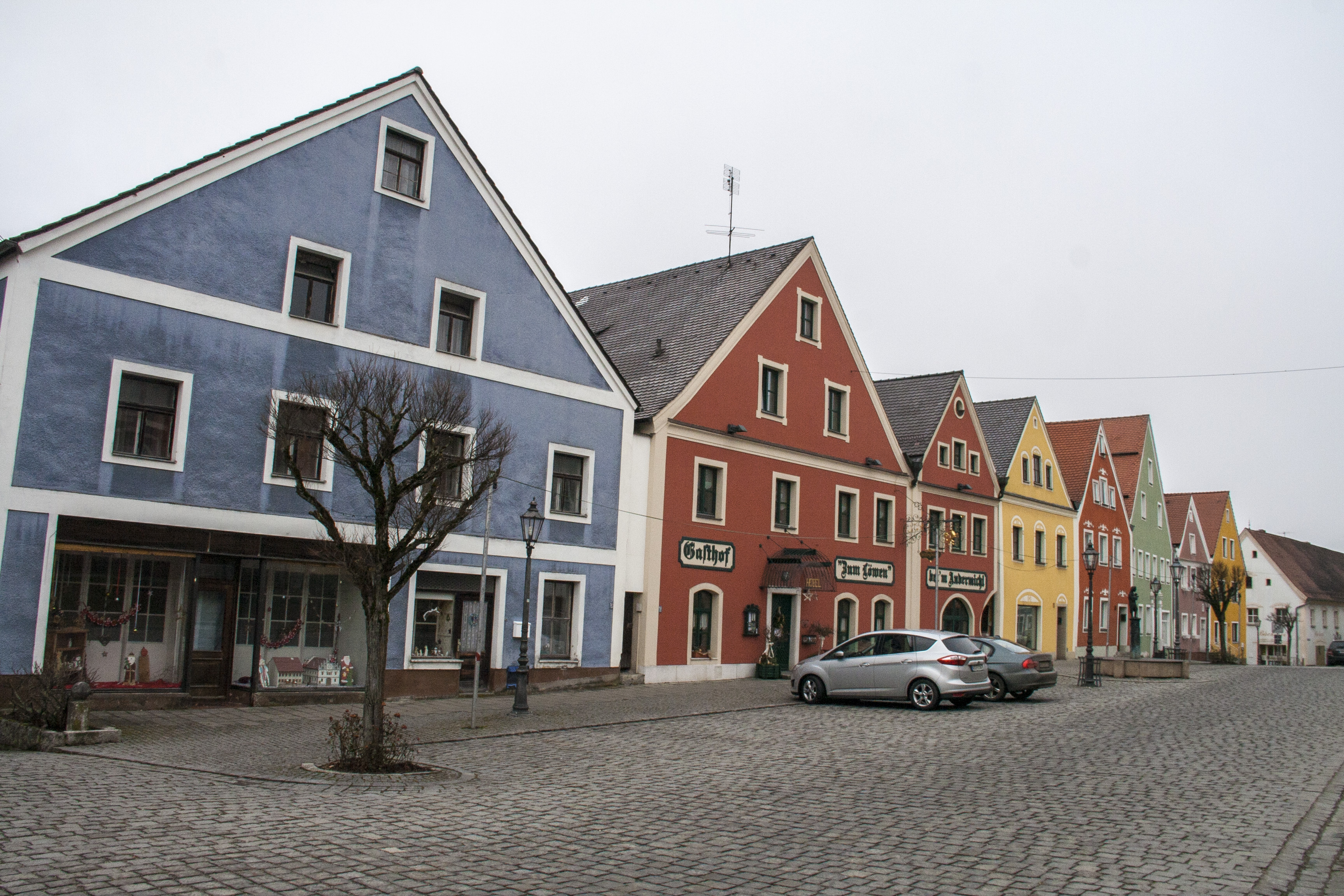
Centre of Velburg

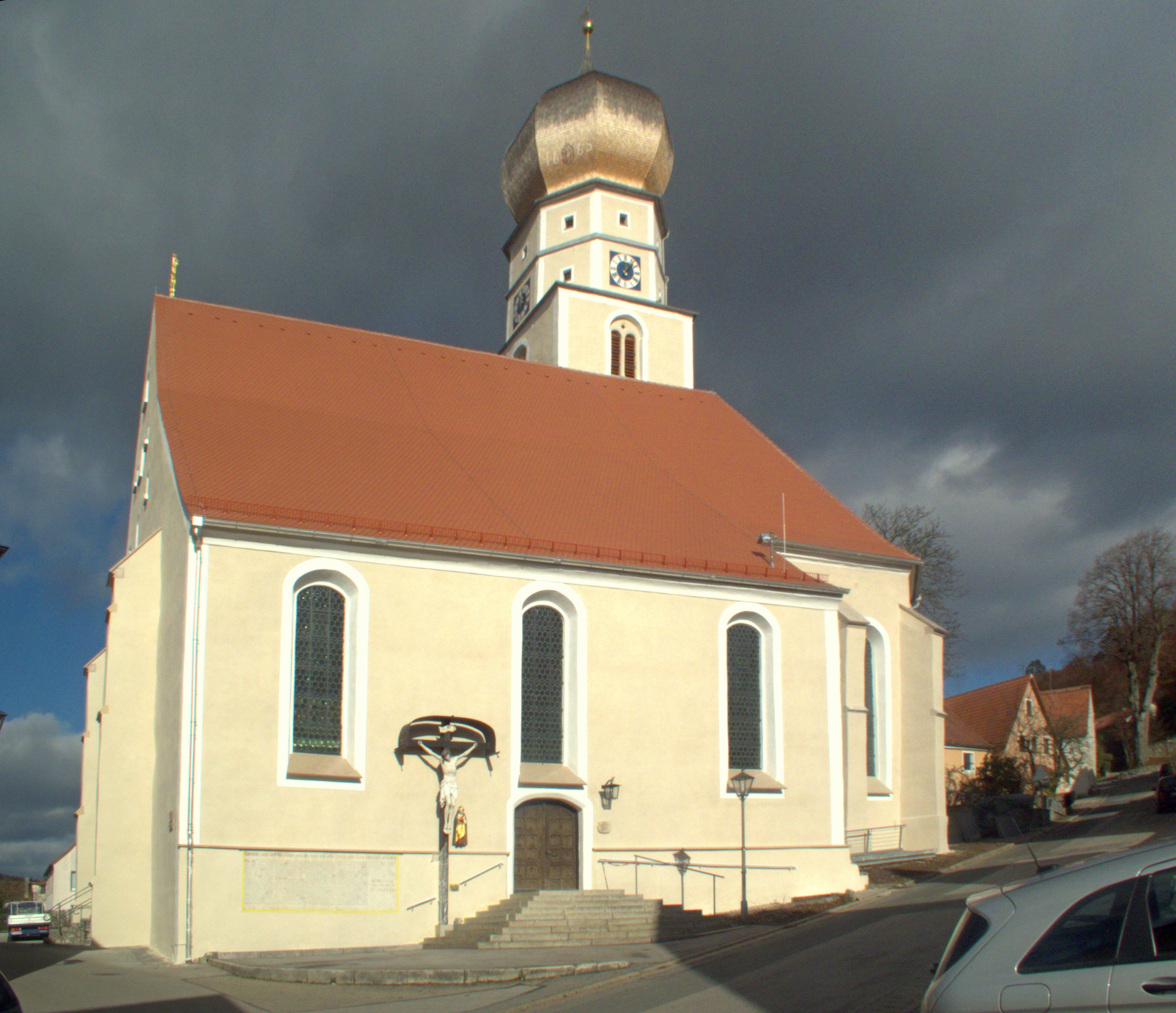
St John the Baptist

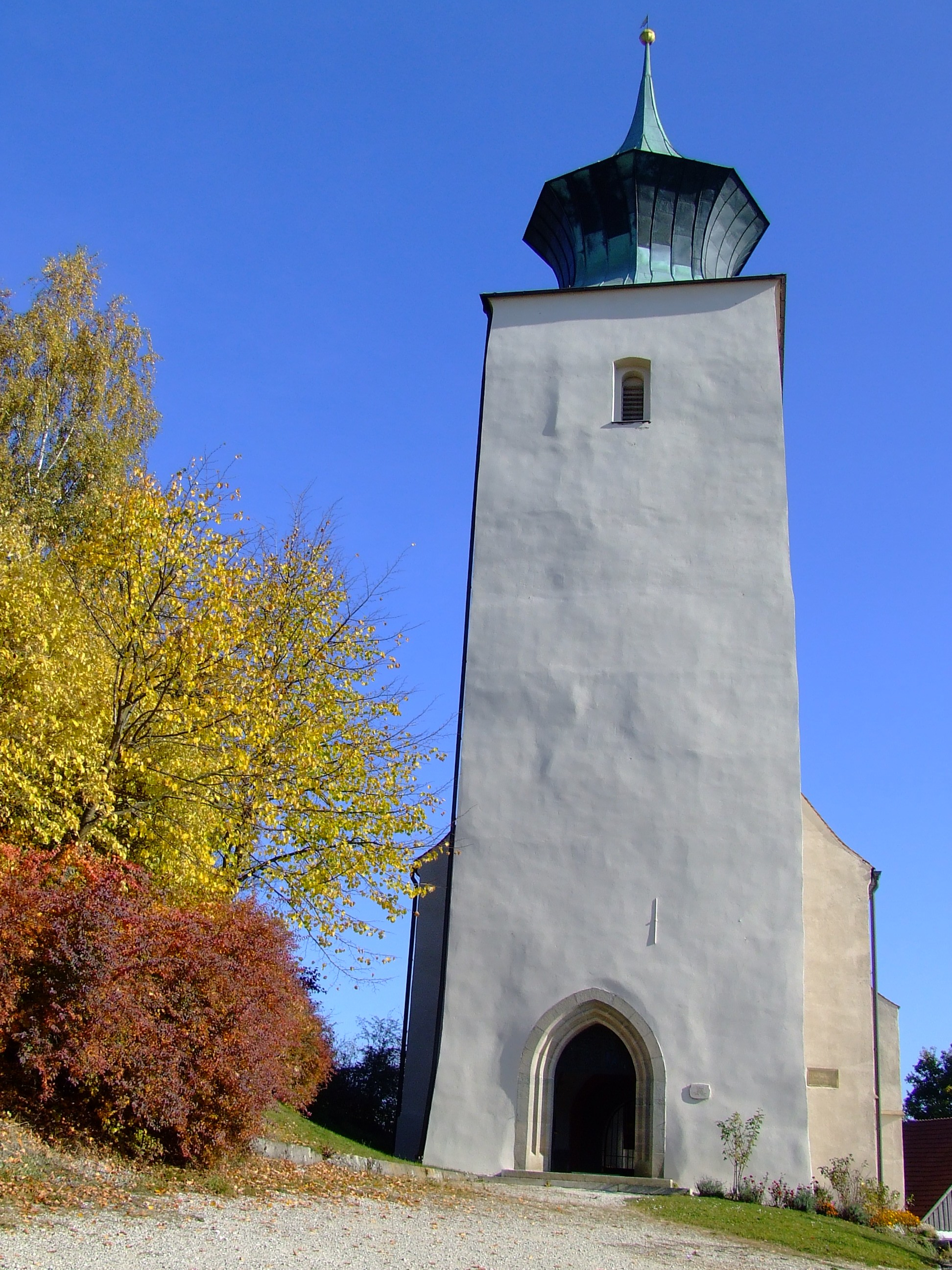
Pilgrimage church of
St. Wolfgang

=== Nature reserves ===
- The Deusmauer Moor near Deusmauer

=== Geotopes ===
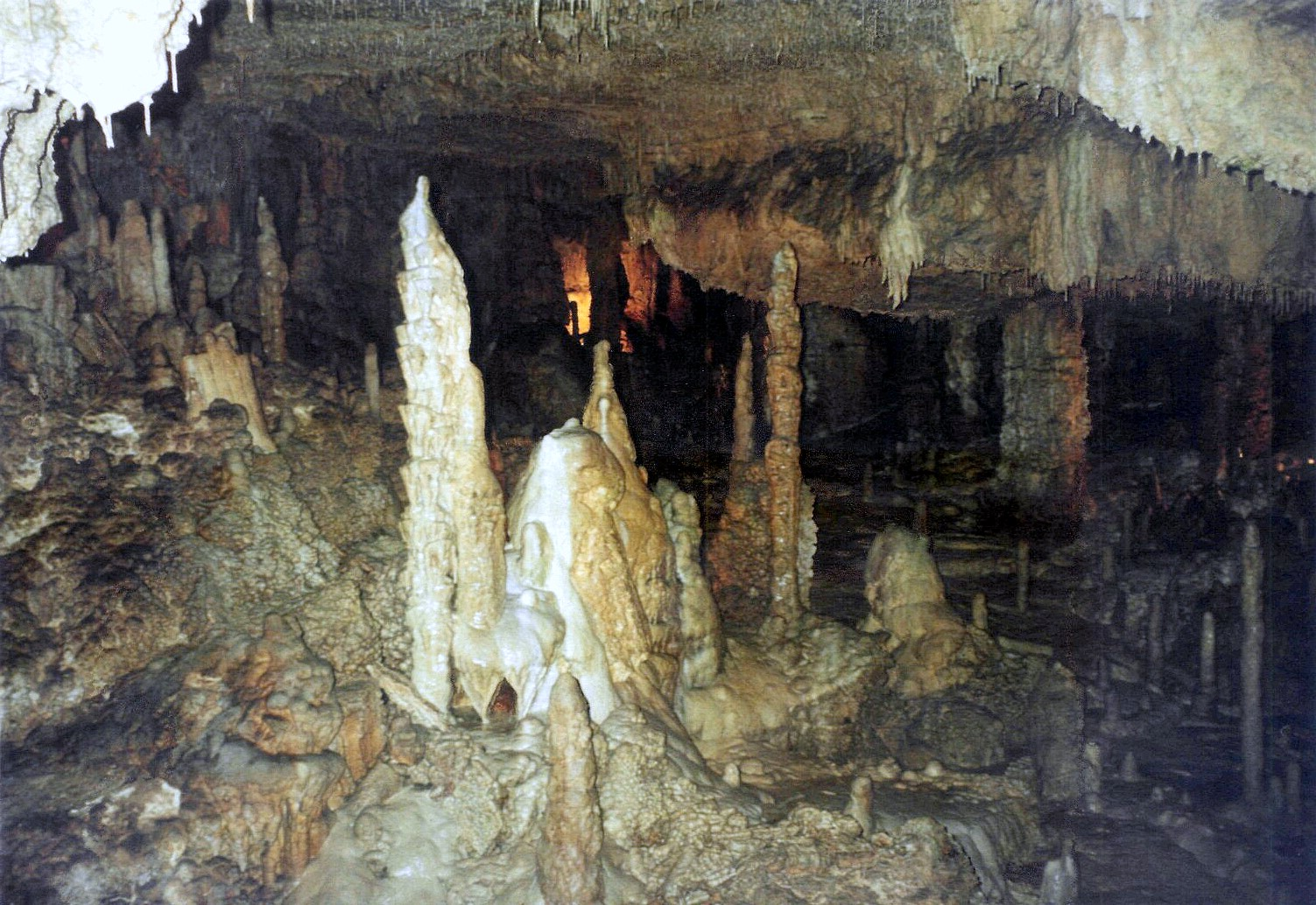
Dripstone in the King Otto dripstone cave

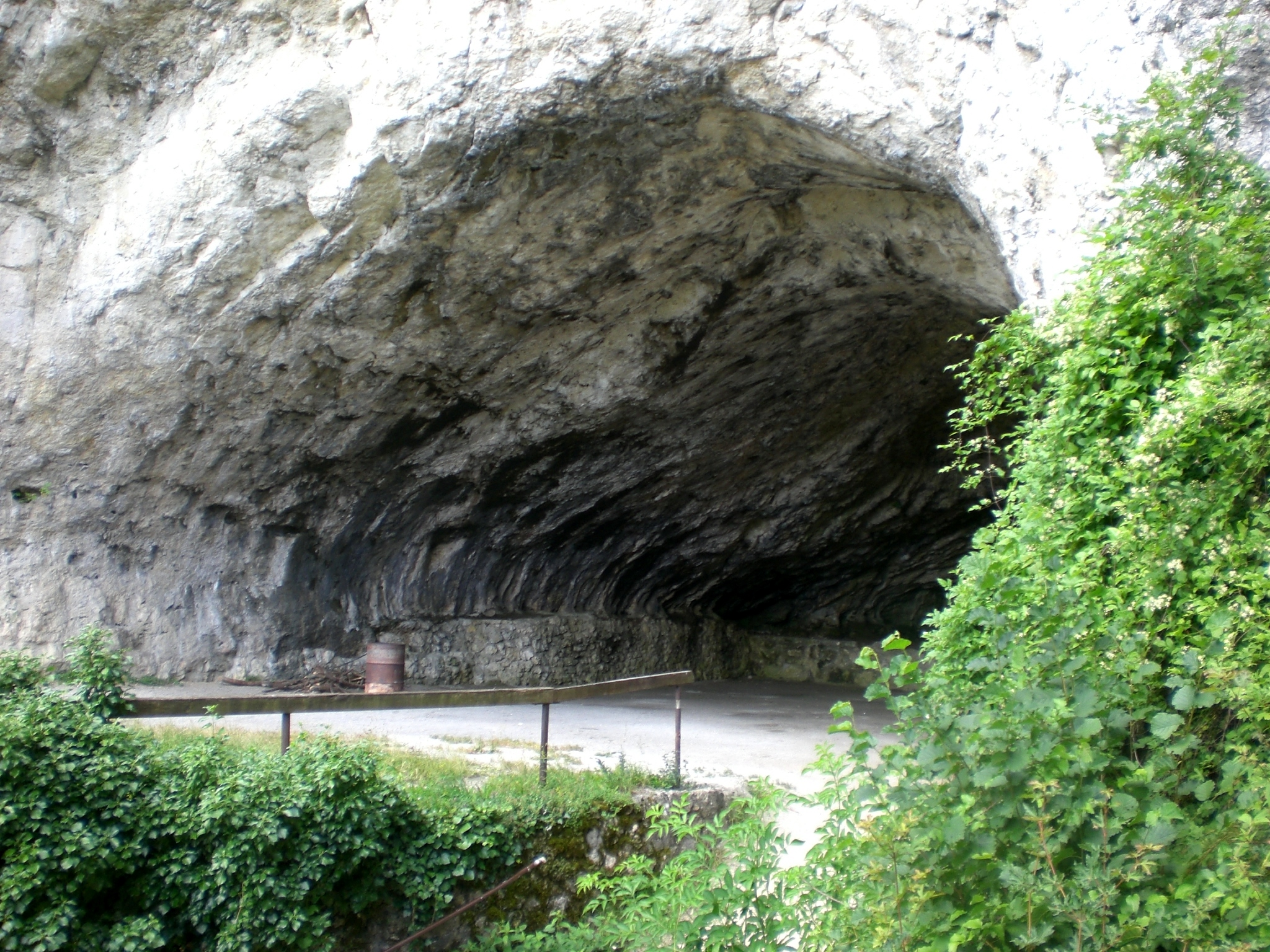
The Hohlloch

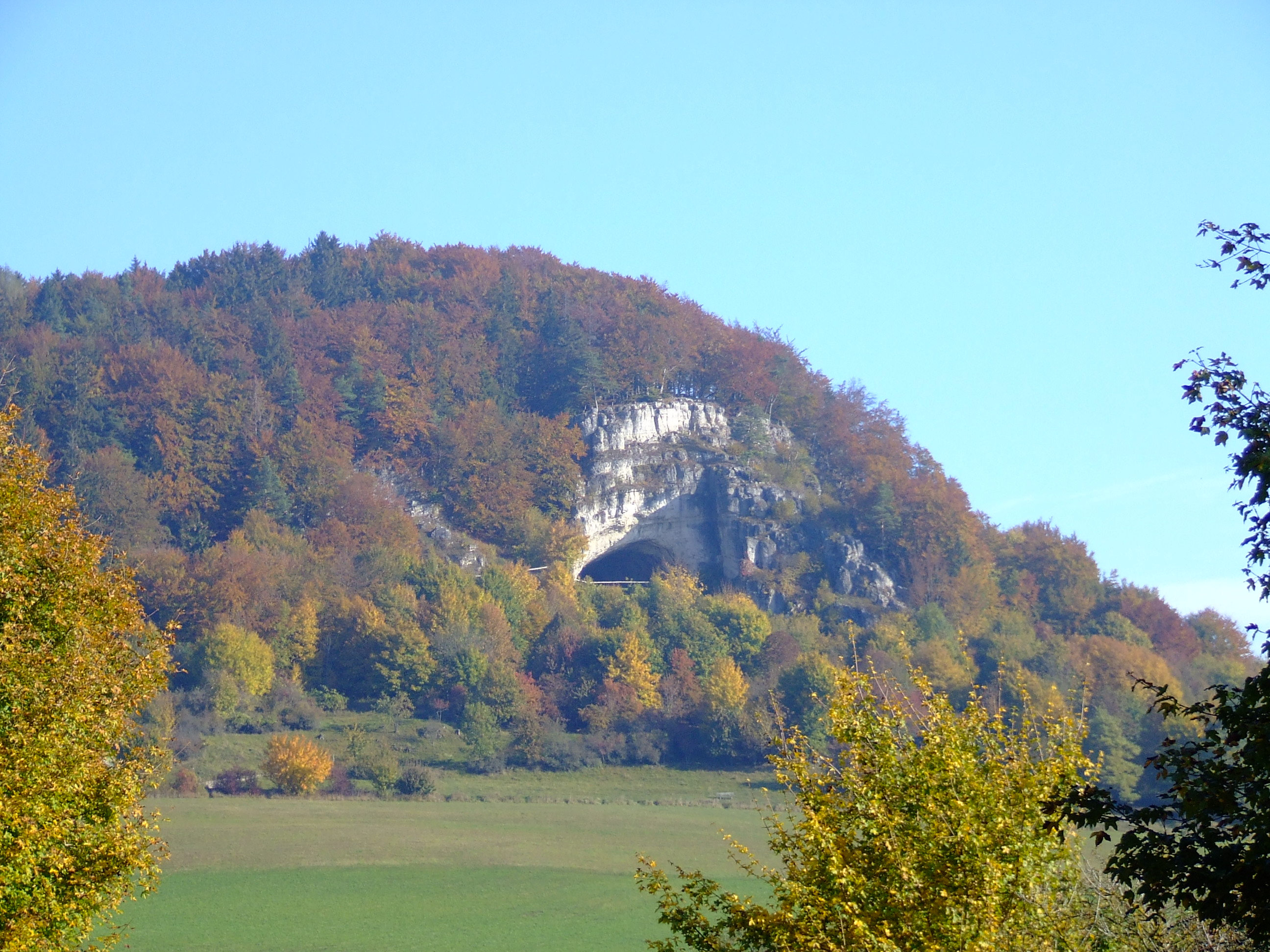
Hohllochberg
- the King Otto Dripstone Cave near St. Colomann (373H001)
- the Hohlloch near St. Wolfgang (373H002)
- the Hohenberg Cave west of Velburg (373H005)
- the Mantlach Doline (373R001)
- the Schwammerl Rocks west of St. Colomann (373R002)
- the Hohllochberg near Velburg (373R003)
- the Dolomite on the castle hill of Velburg Castle (373R004)

=== Natural monuments ===
- King Otto Cave with its advent hall, open from 1 April to 31 October.
- Hohlloch is a grotto and cave complex. In the largest grotto festivals take place.

=== Leisure facilities ===
- Open air swimming pool in Altenveldorf
- Adventure park and climbing garden in Sankt Colomann (6 different courses, 1 baby course)
- Woodland education path
- Cycleways and footpaths

== Sons and daughters of the town ==
- Richard Paul Wagner (1882–1953), engineer, father of the Einheitsdampflokomotive
