= Sinzing =

- Municipality
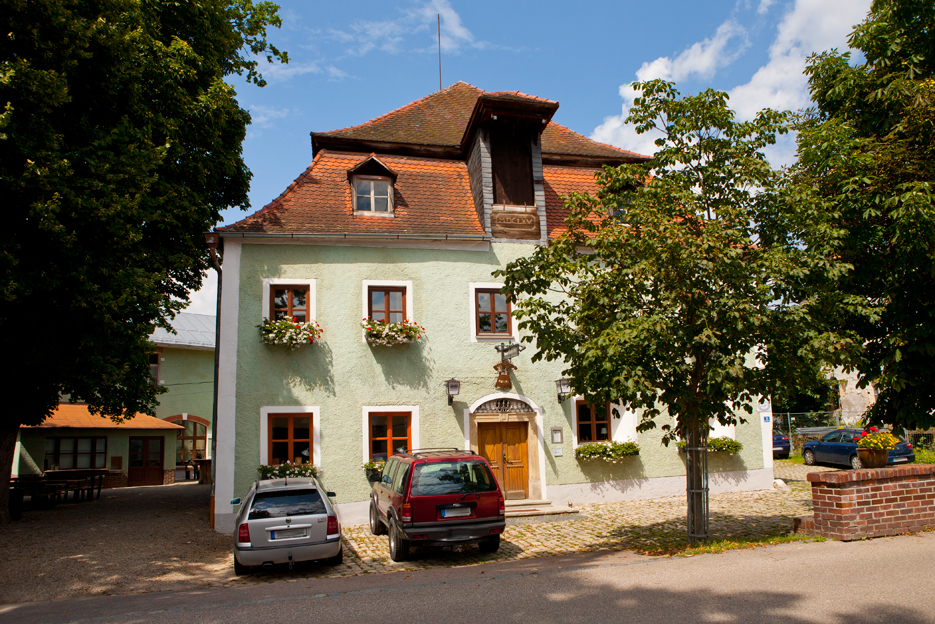
- Gaststätte Röhrl

- Coat of arms

- Location of Sinzing within Regensburg district
- Interactive map of Sinzing
- Location within Germany Location within Bavaria
- Coordinates: 48°59′28″N 12°02′05″E
- Country: Germany
- State: Bavaria
- Admin. region: Oberpfalz
- District: Regensburg
- Subdivisions: 24 Ortsteile

Government
  - Mayor (2024–30): Martin Brix (CSU)

Area
  - Total: 44.12 km^{2} (17.03 sq mi)
- Elevation: 338 m (1,109 ft)

Population (2025-12-31)
  - Total: 7,306
  - Density: 165.6/km^{2} (428.9/sq mi)
- Time zone: UTC+01:00 (CET)
  - Summer (DST): UTC+02:00 (CEST)
- Postal codes: 93161
- Dialling codes: 0941, 09404
- Vehicle registration: R
- Website: www.sinzing.de

Sinzing (German pronunciation: [ˈzɪntsɪŋ]) is a municipality in the district of Regensburg in Bavaria in Germany.

== Geography ==
Sinzing is located on the Schwarzen Laber and the Danube, about eight kilometers west of Regensburg.

== Municipality structure ==
There are 17 districts

Adlstein Alling Bergmatting Bruckdorf Dürnstetten Eilsbrunn Grafenried Hart (PLZ 93152) Kleinprüfening Kohlstadt Kühblöß Mariaort Minoritenhof Niederviehhausen Oberalling Reichenstetten Riegling Saxberg Schneckenbach Sinzing Steg Thalhof Unteralling Viehhausen Vogelsang Waltenhofen Zeiler (PLZ 93152)

== History ==
Sinzing first appeared in historical records in 921. In 1031, the part known as Eilsbrunn was mentioned. This part was, however, almost completely destroyed during the Thirty Years' War. The fortifications in Niederviehhausen were also destroyed; only a tower is still visible. From 1145 until 1966, it was possible to cross the Danube at Sinzing, and until 1485, Sinzing was part of the trade route between Regensburg and Nürnberg. Wine was cultivated in Sinzing up until the 17th century. In the 19th century Sinzing had many mills, some paper factories and a tobacco factory.

The modern district was created in 1972 by the incorporation of the previously independent districts of Sinzing, Viehhausen, Eilsbrunn, and Bergmatting. The Gaststätte Röhrl, the oldest continuously operated restaurant in the world, is located in Eilsbrunn.

== Culture and sights ==
Architectural engineering

Pilgrimage Church Mariaort: The town of Ort was first mentioned in a document in 1020. The church dates from 1192. It was looted in the Thirty Years War, expanded in 1774–1776 and badly damaged in World War II. Early classical high altar, side altars from 1650. The juniper bush on the pulpit on the outside of the church symbolizes that the miraculous image should have swum on a juniper bush from the Black Sea to Mariaort.

Oberviehhausen Castle: The small castle was first mentioned in a document in 1435, it changed hands several times over the centuries. It was destroyed by the Swedes during the Thirty Years War and only rebuilt in 1697. The castle building is now used as a rectory.

Castle ruin Niederviehhausen: The castle was destroyed by the Swedes during the Thirty Years War. Today only the six-story, 22-meter-high tower made of humpback ashlar remains.

Old church in Sinzing: Church with Romanesque frescoes from 1145. The building with the massive tower with pyramid roof probably dates from the 13th or 14th century. The furnishings are baroque.

Bruckdorf Church: mainly from the 11th century.

Röhrl restaurant in Eilsbrunn: Family-owned since 1658 and, according to the Guinness Book of Records, the oldest continuously operated restaurant in the world
