= Solutional cave =

Type of cave

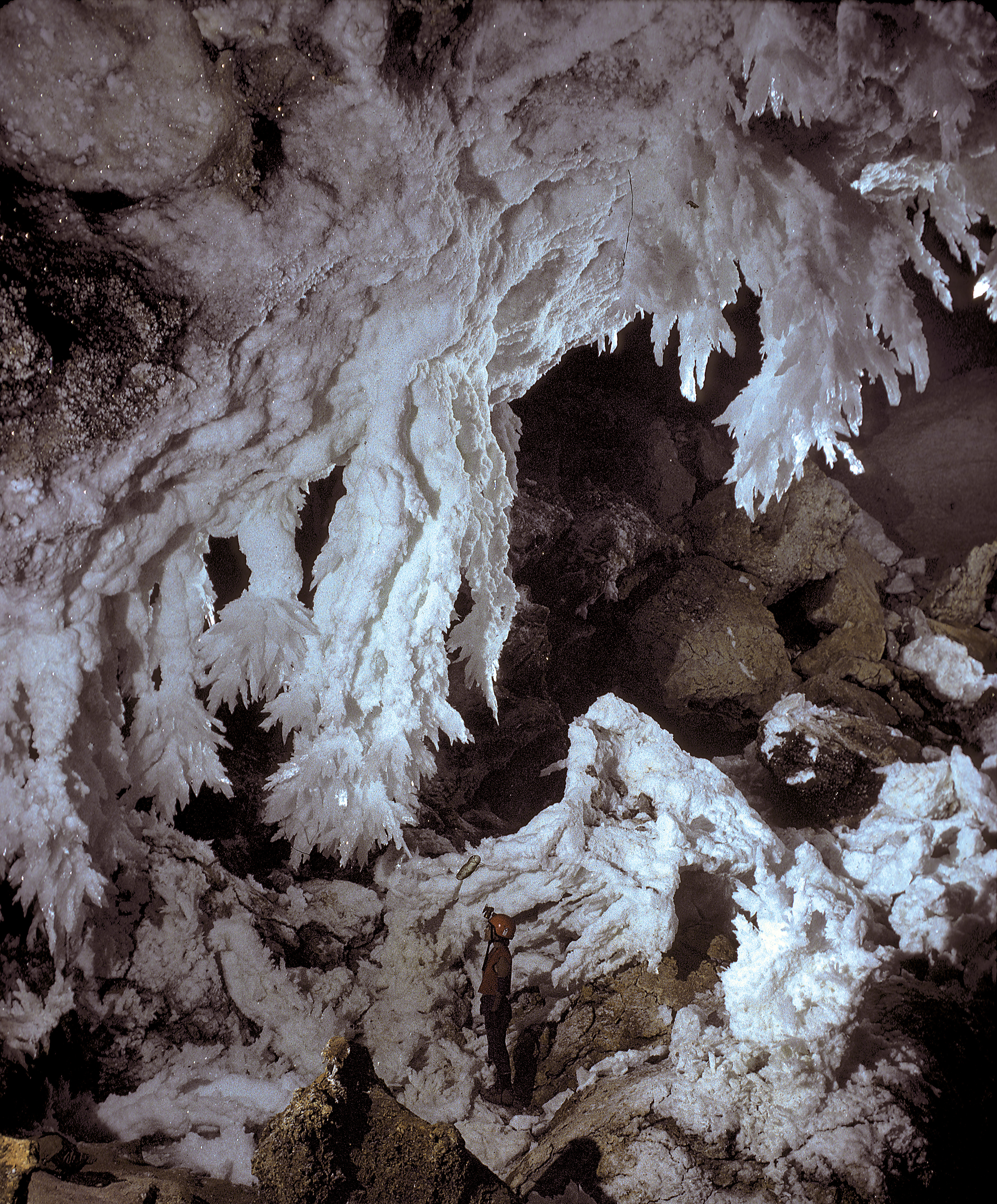
Gypsum stalactites in a cave formed via sulfuric acid dissolution (Lechuguilla Cave, New Mexico)

A solutional cave, solution cave, or karst cave is usually formed in a soluble rock like limestone, which is composed of calcium carbonate (CaCO_{3}). Being the most common type of cave, it can also form in other rocks, including chalk, dolomite, marble, salt beds, and gypsum.

== Process ==
Bedrock is dissolved by carbonic acid in rainwater, groundwater, or humic acids from decaying vegetation, that seeps through bedding planes, faults, joints, and the like. Over time, the surface terrain breaks up into clints separated by grikes and punctuated by sinkholes into which streams may disappear, crevices expand as the walls are dissolved to become caves or cave system. These may turn into large caverns or dolines when the roof collapses.

The portions of a solutional cave that are below the water table or the local level of the groundwater are flooded.

== Limestone caves ==
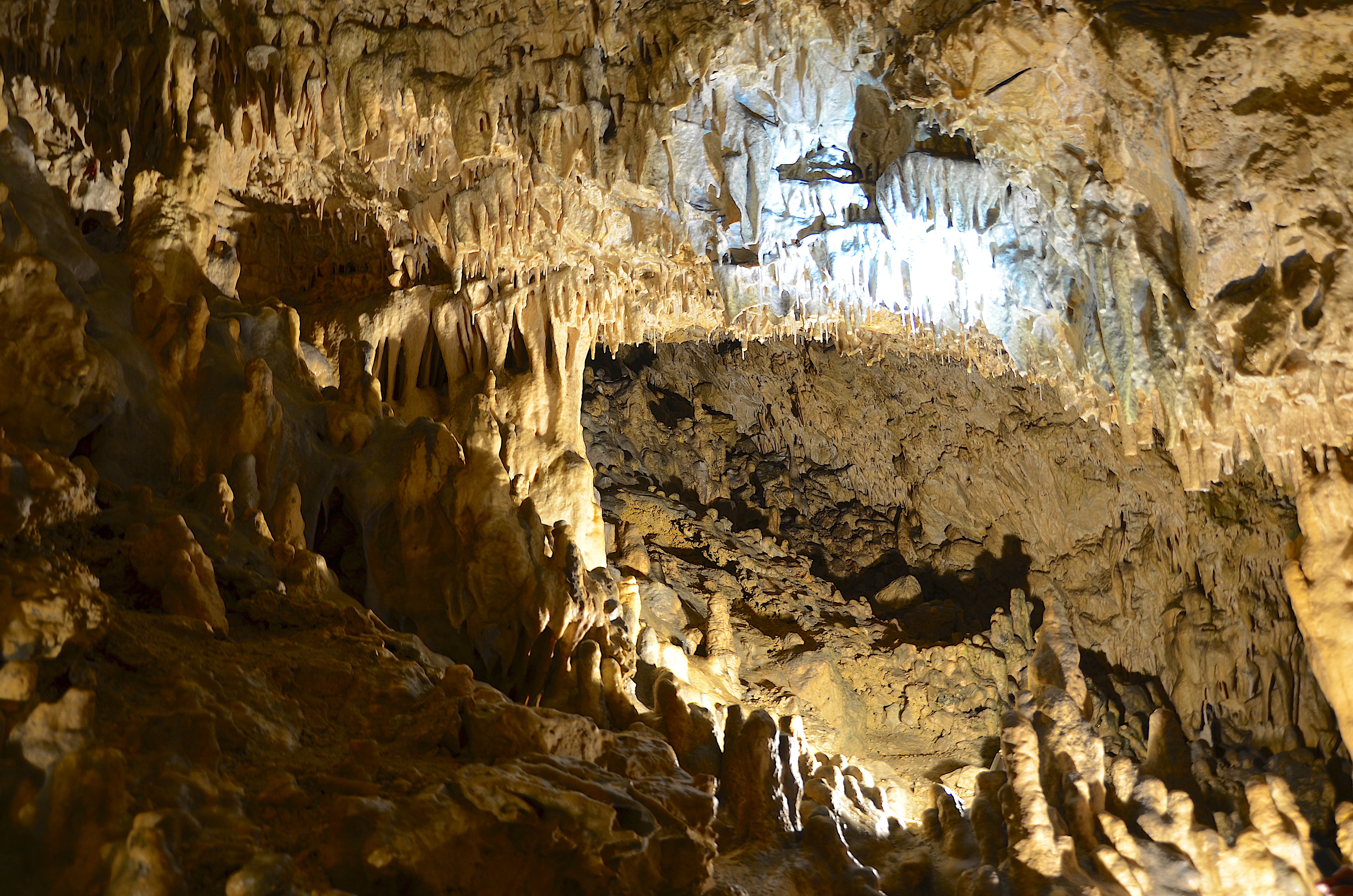
Limestone cave Kolbinger Höhle

The largest and most abundant solutional caves are located in limestone. Limestone caves are often adorned with calcium carbonate formations produced through slow precipitation. These include flowstones, stalactites, stalagmites, helictites, soda straws, calcite rafts, and columns. These secondary mineral deposits in caves are called "speleothems".

=== Carbonic acid dissolution ===
Limestone dissolves under the action of rainwater and groundwater charged with H_{2}CO_{3} (carbonic acid) and naturally occurring organic acids. The dissolution process produces a distinctive landform known as "karst", characterized by sinkholes and underground drainage. Solutional caves in this landform—topography are often called karst caves.

=== Sulfuric acid dissolution ===
Lechuguilla Cave in New Mexico and nearby Carlsbad Caverns are now believed to be examples of another type of solutional cave. They were formed by H_{2}S (hydrogen sulfide) gas rising from below, where reservoirs of petroleum give off sulfurous fumes. This gas mixes with ground water and forms H_{2}SO_{4} (sulfuric acid). The acid then dissolves the limestone from below, rather than from above, by acidic water percolating to the surface.

== Gypsum caves ==
Some solutional caves form in gypsum. Gypsum karst is very rare. It depends on deposits of gypsum or anhydrite, often also called alabaster. Chemically it is calcium sulfate, CaSO_{4}.

Gypsum caves can be found in several places on earth, including:

- Optymistychna Cave in Ukraine, considered the longest gypsum cave at 232 km
- Orda Cave underneath the Western Ural Mountains, with 5.1 km length, including 4.8 km underwater
- Cuevas de Sorbas in Almeria, Spain

Caves noted for large scale gypsum speleothems include:

- Cave of the Crystals in Chihuahua, Mexico
- Lechuguilla Cave in New Mexico, US

== Examples ==
=== Australia ===
- Jenolan Caves, New South Wales

=== Germany ===
- König-Otto-Tropfsteinhöhle

=== Malaysia ===
- List of caves in Malaysia

=== Taiwan ===
- Black Dwarf Cave, Pingtung County

=== United States ===
- Jewel Cave National Monument, South Dakota
- Mammoth Cave National Park, Kentucky
- Russell Cave National Monument, Alabama
- Cathedral Caverns State Park, Alabama
- Wind Cave National Park, South Dakota
- Oregon Caves National Monument and Preserve, Oregon
- Cumberland Caverns, Tennessee

=== Vietnam ===
- Hang Sơn Đoòng, Quảng Bình Province
