= Upper Palatinate Jura =

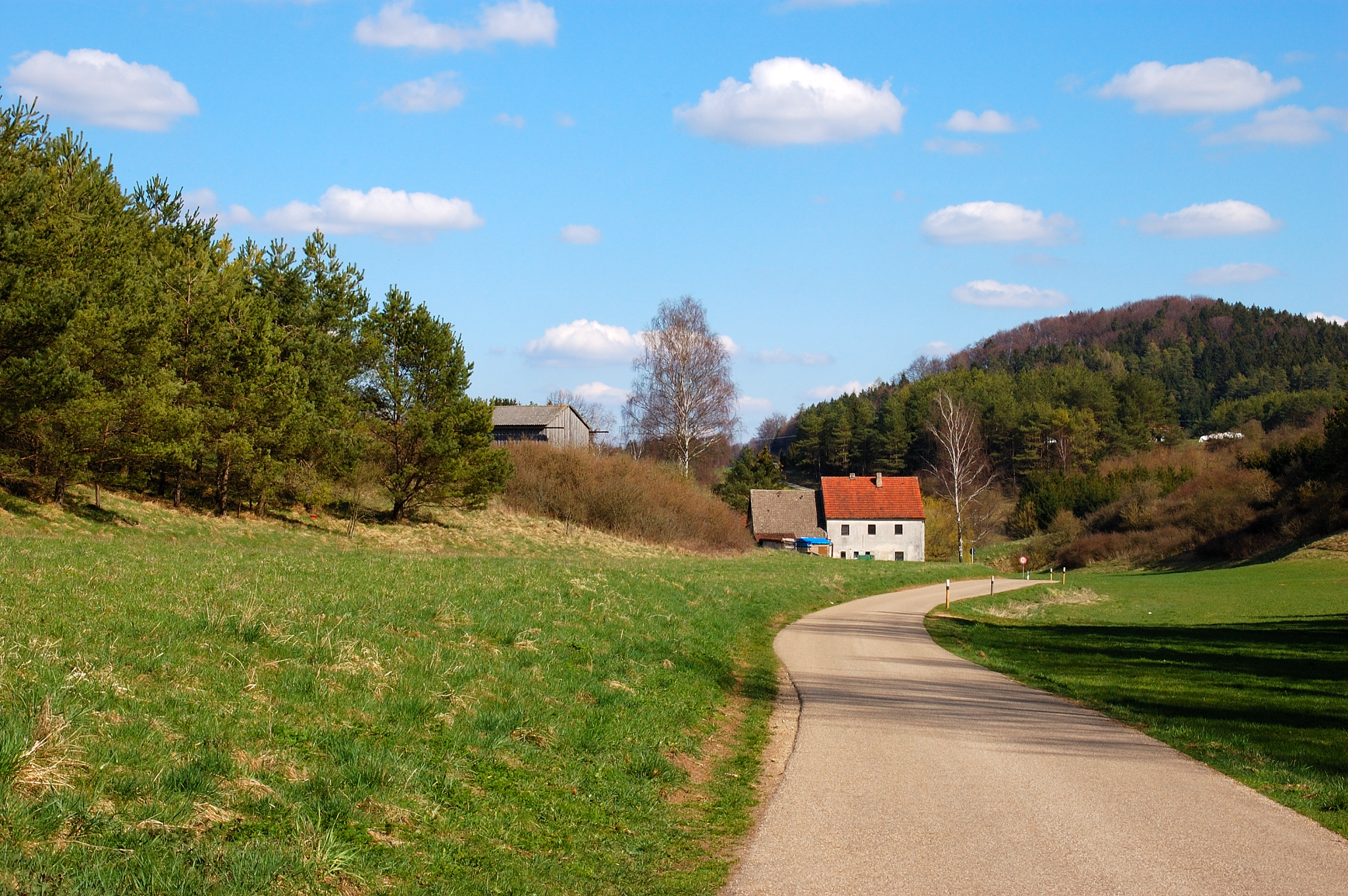
A typical landscape in the Upper Palatinate Jura.

The Upper Palatinate Jura, also called the Upper Palatine Jura (German: Oberpfalz Jura) is the part of the Franconian Jura. The main part is located in Upper Palatinate (German: Oberpfalz) in Bavaria, Germany. It extends over the districts of Amberg-Sulzbach, Neumarkt, the east of Nürnberger Land, small part in the west of Schwandorf the northwest of Regensburg and north of Kelheim.

== Literature ==
- Dietz, Christian and Andreas Kiefer (2016). Bats of Britain and Europe. London & NY: Bloomsbury.
- Walentowski, Helge, Gregor Aas, Alexander Göllner, Lisa Ahl and Martin Feulner (2018). Phytosociological studies of Malus sylvestris in North Hesse and Upper Franconia, Germany. Göttingen: Tuexenia.
