= Simbach am Inn–Pocking railway =

Former railway line in Bavaria, Germany

Simbach am Inn–Pocking
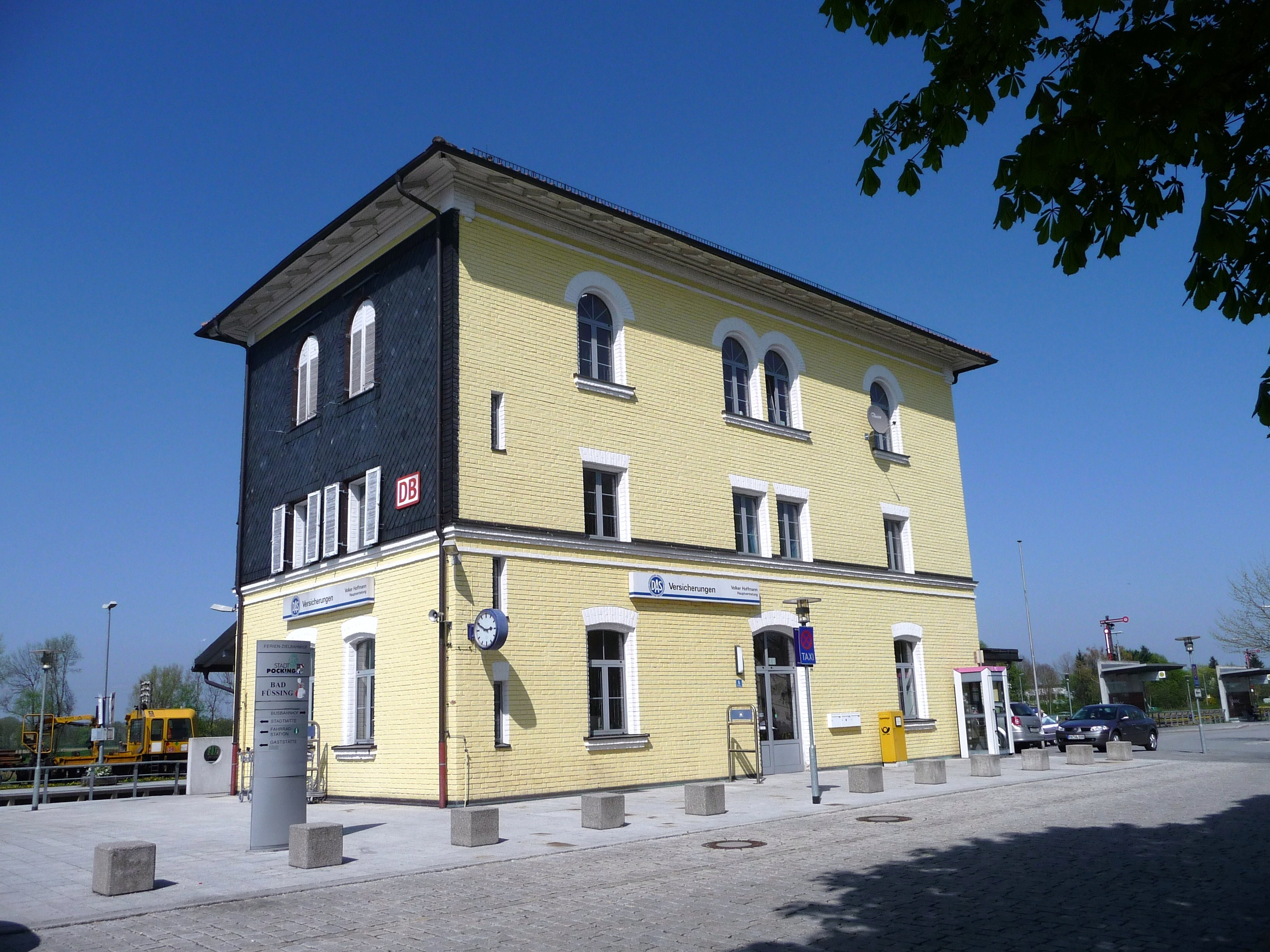
- The station of Pocking

Overview
- Line number: 5727

Service
- Route number: 427f (1969)

Technical
- Line length: 28.38 km (17.63 mi)
- Track gauge: 1,435 mm (4.708 ft)

The Simbach am Inn–Pocking railway was a single-tracked branch line between Simbach am Inn and Pocking in the province of Lower Bavaria in southern Germany.

== Preparations ==
=== Early planning ===
On 9 April 1894 the market town of Rotthalmünster and the communities to Simbach asked the head office of the Royal Bavarian State Railways for a branch line (Lokalbahn) to be built from Simbach am Inn to Rotthalmünster. Because that came to nothing, they pressed instead for a railway from Vilshofen to Simbach.

This proposal was presented by a delegation in Munich. Although this generated little enthusiasm with the head office, they did show a degree of interest in the original desire for a railway from Simbach to Rotthalmünster. So, on 3 December 1896 a new application for this line was submitted. On 30 January 1897 the Ministry for the Royal Household and Foreign Affairs announced their approval for the scoping of a Lokalbahn from Simbach am Inn to Rotthalmünster. In 1897 the state construction engineer, Ernst Arnold, started to plan a line to run alongside the River Inn to Rotthalmünster.

=== The intervention of Kößlarn ===
But at this point the market town of Kößlarn entered the scene. On 7 December 1897 Kößlarn's railway committee proposed a line from Simbach through the Lower Bavarian Hills via Wittibreut to Kößlarn and then from there to Rotthalmünster. The mayor, Johann Abtmaier, justified this on the grounds that otherwise Kößlarn would be isolated, a situation that would force them to oppose any project for a railway alongside the Inn.

The Royal Bavarian State Railways (K.Bay.Sts.B.) decided that only one railway could be built and that the line alongside the River Inn would be more promising than the one proposed by Kößlarn. This resulted in a protracted tug-of-war over the route. In 1899 Kößlarn sent in a list of the goods that would be handled by their proposed line and calculated that 61,260 tonnes of freight would be transported on it annually. On 6 May 1899, the undersecretary, Friedrich Krafft von Crailsheim, rejected this assessment of the data on the grounds that it was significantly overestimated. The Kößlarn railway was seen as less economical because it was about 3.7 kilometres longer and had 153 metres of additional height to overcome.

Undeterred, Kößlarn and Wittibreut sent a new petition to Munich on 27 October 1900 for the construction of a railway line to Kößlarn. The K.Bay.Sts.B.'s general manager, Gustav Ebermayer, ignored the letter, but let it be known that they were prepared to carry out a scoping exercise for a line from Rotthalmünster to Kößlarn on payment of 1,000 gold marks. Kößlarn transferred the money immediately.

== Construction of the Simbach–Rotthalmünster–Kößlarn line ==
In April 1901 construction began in Rotthalmünster. Immediately, Pastor Franz Xaver Almer complained to the head office that the railway was being built too close to the vicarage and its grounds. The resulting exchange of correspondence and local meetings cause a further delay. In 1902 another deputation from Kößlarn was sent to Munich with a request for an extension of the line to Kößlarn.

On 19 May 1903 there was a decisive meeting in Rotthalmünster at which all those affected were present from the district officer (Bezirksamtsmann) to representatives of every rural district. It transpired that 195,000 marks was needed for the purchase of land, of which 15,000 marks could be found.

On 10 August 1904 the law for the 23.07 kilometre long Lokalbahn from Simbach via Tutting to Rotthalmünster came into force. Kößlarn had to wait anxiously until a further law was passed on 26 June 1908 for the construction of the 6.23 kilometre long remaining section to the town. On 29 October 1910 the railway from Simbach to Rotthalmünster was opened and, on 1 May 1911 the rest of the line to Kößlarn went into service as well.

== Construction of the Tutting–Pocking line ==
Now the offensive began for the construction of a link line to Pocking. As early as 27 June 1901 a railway committee for a Simbach–Pocking Lokalbahn set out the necessity for a through link from Simbach to Passau. They pressed for a junction for the new line with the Passau–Neumarkt-Sankt Veit railway. In order to travel by rail from Simbach to Passau at that time the trains had to pass through Austrian territory for 84 kilometres, a journey that took five to six hours. By building a line from Tutting to Pocking it was argued that the distance could be reduced to 64 kilometres and the time taken to just three hours. There were also complaints that those participating in a pilgrimage from Passau to Altötting had to pay 2,000 marks for travelling on the Austrian Railway and had to put up with customs inspections as well.

On 28 July 1906 all the interested parties met in Pocking. A proposal from the Hartkirchen community to run the planned line via their village, was refused, because it would have meant the link being almost twenty kilometres long rather than eight. On 2 November 1912 the Tutting–Pocking line was approved and it went into service on 1 December 1914. It was 8.87 kilometres long.

== Operations ==
Trains ran through from Simbach to Pocking and also worked the stub line from Tutting via Rotthalmünster to Kößlarn. In 1921 four pairs of trains ran daily from Simbach to Pocking, the journey time for the 28.4 kilometres being 105 minutes; which represented an average speed of 16 km/h. On the Tutting–Kößlarn railway three pairs of trains worked the line each day, taking 38 minutes to traverse the 9.8 kilometre long route. In the winter of 1953/54 Uerdingen railbuses appeared on both lines, reducing the journey time to 57 and 22 minutes respectively. At the time eight train pairs ran daily on each line.

Despite that operations were always unprofitable. On 2 October 1960 the Deutsche Bundesbahn closed down the passenger services between Tutting and Kößlarn. On 1 June 1969 passenger services between Pocking and Simbach and goods services between Simbach and Tutting were withdrawn. Goods traffic between Rotthalmünster and Kößlarn ceased on 1 January 1970. In February 1972 work began on dismantling the line.

Only the goods traffic between Pocking and Rotthalmünster was maintained until the closure of the Tutting–Rotthalmünster section on 1 January 1996. This left the Bundeswehr transport from the Rott Valley Barracks in Kirchham. The siding to the barracks was lifted prematurely and so loading was moved to the station at Tutting until the barracks finally closed in 2002. On 1 July 2003 the Tutting–Pocking railway was finally closed.

In 2007 the former trackbed was released from railway requirements by the Federal Railway Office in a process under § 23 of the General Railway Law and so its last formal link with the railways was ended. The only signs of the old railway today are two bridges and the roads that are named after the stations. On the trackbed of the Tutting–Pocking section a cycle path was laid in 2008.

== See also ==
- Royal Bavarian State Railways
- Bavarian branch lines
- List of closed railway lines in Bavaria

== Sources ==
- Walther Zeitler: Eisenbahnen in Niederbayern und in der Oberpfalz, Weiden 1985, ISBN 3-924350-01-9
