= Tutting–Kößlarn railway =

Railway line in Germany

Tutting–Kößlarn
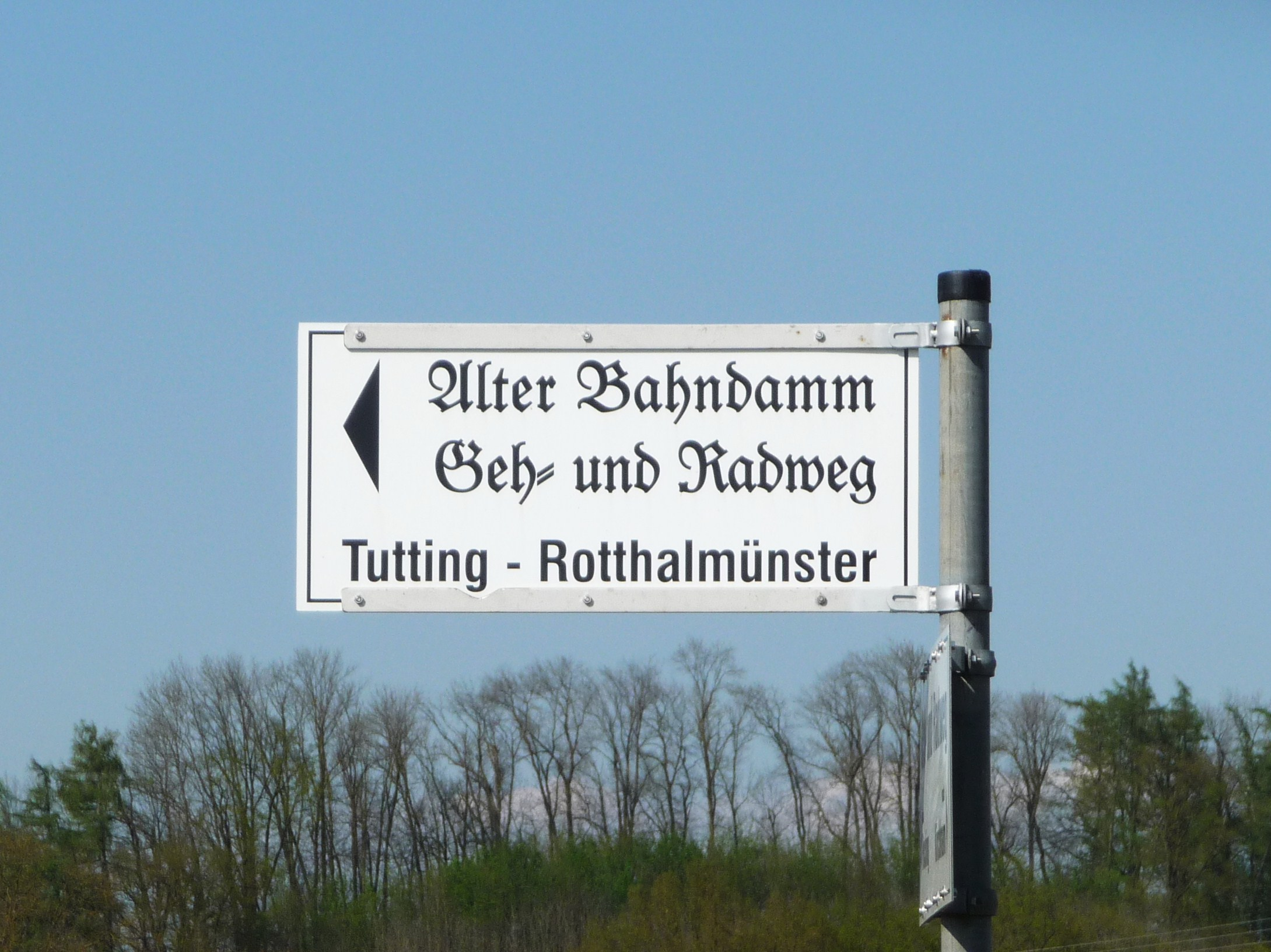
- Signpost in Tutting at the start of the cycle path

Overview
- Line number: 5728

Technical
- Line length: 9.78 km (6.08 mi)
- Track gauge: 1,435 mm (4.708 ft)

The Tutting–Kößlarn railway was a branch line from Tutting, in the municipality of Kirchham, to Kößlarn in the province of Lower Bavaria in southern Germany.

== Conception ==
This railway was the somewhat unexpected result of a tug-of-war lasting several years between the market towns of Rotthalmünster and Kößlarn, which both wanted a branch line (Lokalbahn) from Simbach am Inn with their own town as the terminus. The Royal Bavarian State Railways (K.Bay.Sts.B.) decided, however, that only one line could be built and the course alongside the River Inn to Rotthalmünster was judged to be the more favourable than the Kößlarn one that would have run via Wittibreut through hilly terrain.

Undeterred, Kößlarn and Wittibreut sent a new petition to the head office of the Bavarian State Railways in Munich on 27 October 1900 proposing the construction of a railway to Kößlarn. The K.Bay.Sts.B general manager, Gustav Ebermayer, noted that this submission was not much more promising, but was prepared to undertake the scoping of a Rotthalmünster–Kößlarn route, on payment of 1,000 gold marks, a sum which Kößlarn immediately forwarded.

On 10 August 1904 a law was passed that set things in motion on a 23.07 kilometre long Lokalbahn from Simbach via Tutting to Rotthalmünster. Kößlarn had been temporarily left out and it was not until a law of 26 June 1908 that construction on the remaining 6.23 kilometre section of line to Kößlarn was approved. On 29 October 1910 the line from Simbach to Rotthalmünster was opened, the remaining stretch to Kößlarn followed on 1 May 1911.

As early as 2 November 1912, however, another law was passed to extend the line from Tutting to Pocking in order to establish a link between Passau and Simbach. On 1 December 1914 the Tutting–Pocking section entered service which meant that the Simbach am Inn–Pocking railway was now open as well.

== Operation ==
As a result, the section from Tutting to Kößlarn became a stub line that was operated independently. This Lokalbahn proved to be just as unprofitable as the railway from Simbach am Inn to Pocking. In 1921 three pairs of trains ran daily between Tutting and Kößlarn, each covering the 9.8 kilometre long stretch in 38 minutes. From the winter of 1953/54 Uerdingen railbuses were also laid on, reducing the journey time to just 22 minutes. Nevertheless, the Deutsche Bundesbahn withdrew its passenger services on 2 October 1960. Goods traffic between Rotthalmünster and Kößlarn ended on 1 January 1970, and on 1 January 1996 the remaining section between Tutting and Rotthalmünster was closed. The entire line has now been dismantled and a cycle path built on the old trackbed.

In 2007 the old railway facilities were released by the Federal Railway Office in a process based on § 23 of the General Railway Law (Allgemeines Eisenbahngesetz) and thereby lost their final connexion with the railway.

== See also ==
- Royal Bavarian State Railways
- Bavarian branch lines
- List of closed railway lines in Bavaria

== Sources ==
- Walther Zeitler: Eisenbahnen in Niederbayern und in der Oberpfalz, Weiden, 1985, ISBN 3-924350-01-9
