= Bavarian Forest Club =

Hiking club

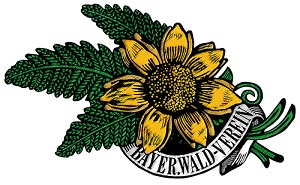
Bavarian Forest Club

The Bavarian Forest Club (German: Bayerische Wald-Verein), or BWV, is a German club that promotes culture, local history and folklore, nature and landscape conservation, and walking in the Bavarian Forest. It has its head office in Zwiesel and is registered in the register of clubs and societies in the district office at Deggendorf (VR 10158).

== History ==
The founder of the club was Anton Niederleuthner, senior judge in Passau. The foundation of the club in 1883 goes back to his meeting with foresters in Bodenmais. The Bavarian Forest Club was founded in Deggendorf Town Hall on 25 November 1883, with Bodenmais townsman Bartholomäus Stölzl appointed as its first chairman. On 6 June 1885, Niederleuthner established the Passau Branch, the club's first local branch. On 22 August, he was elected the first president and made Passau the club's base. He managed the club for over 20 years and founded more than 40 additional local branches. The club emblem used today originates from Niederleuthner.

A club magazine, Der Bayerwald, was also launched. Its editor in the 1930s was the Nazi, Eugen Hubrich.

The main goals of the club were to develop the Bavarian Forest as a hiking and holiday destination, create a dense network of hiking trails, and construct refuge huts. Later they concentrated on the maintenance and waymarking of trails, the conservation of refuge huts and viewing towers as well as measures such as the protection of the Schachten, the historical grazing areas of the highlands. Until the founding of the Bavarian Forest Nature Park in 1967 and the Bavarian Forest National Park in 1970, the Bavarian Forest Club was the only major institution that placed the culture and nature of the Bavarian Forest at the centre of its activities.

== Today ==
In 2016, the club comprised 60 branches and had about 20,000 members. The individual branches own important buildings and refuge huts. For example, Kollnburg Castle and Neunußberg Castle are owned by the Viechtach branch, and the Lusenschutzhaus by the Grafenau branch. Important annual events include the Bayerwaldtag (Bavarian Forest Day) and the art exhibition, Zwieseler Buntspecht, in Zwiesel. On the Oberbreitenau a youth education centre has been created in the Landshut House named after the Landshut branch.

On 26 October 2008, the club celebrated its 125th anniversary in the festival hall of Deggendorf's old town hall. Minister of State Josef Miller delivered a speech at the very spot where the Bavarian Forest Club was founded on 25 November 1883.

Since early 2016, the club has become a member of the German Hiking Association, to which it had already previously belonged until its departure on 31 December 2006. In the interim, the Interessensgemeinschaft Bayerischer Wald, consisting of the Dreiburgenland and Ruderting-Neukirchen branches, was a member of the German Hiking Association from June 2008 to the end of 2013.
