= Hutthurm =

Municipality in Bavaria, Germany

- Municipality
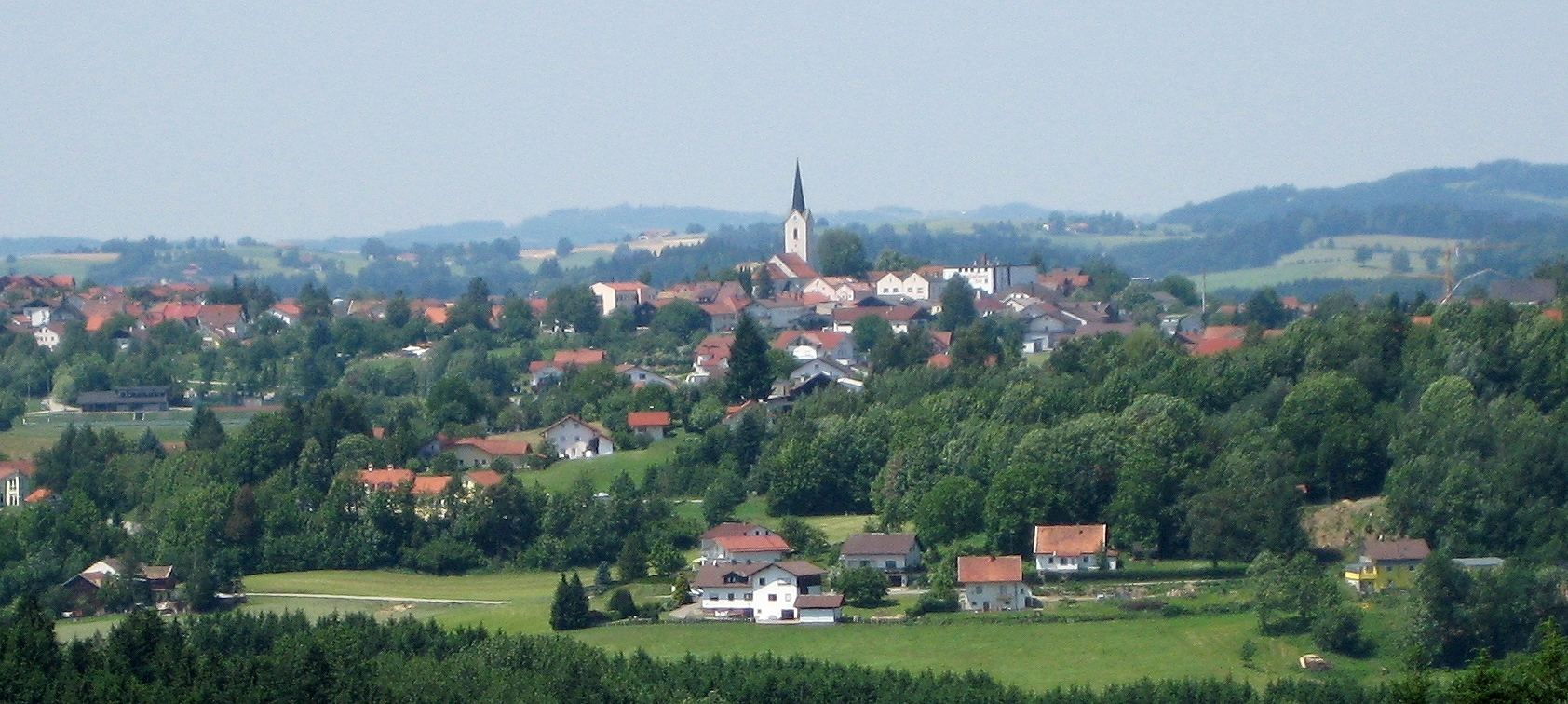
- Hutthurm seen from Büchlberg

- Coat of arms

- Location of Hutthurm within Passau district
- Interactive map of Hutthurm
- Location within Germany Location within Bavaria
- Coordinates: 48°40′N 13°29′E
- Country: Germany
- State: Bavaria
- Admin. region: Niederbayern
- District: Passau

Government
  - Mayor (2023–29): Maximilian Rosenberger (SPD)

Area
  - Total: 37.20 km^{2} (14.36 sq mi)
- Elevation: 465 m (1,526 ft)

Population (2025-12-31)
  - Total: 6,342
  - Density: 170.5/km^{2} (441.6/sq mi)
- Time zone: UTC+01:00 (CET)
  - Summer (DST): UTC+02:00 (CEST)
- Postal codes: 94116
- Dialling codes: 08505
- Vehicle registration: PA
- Website: www.hutthurm.de

Hutthurm (Central Bavarian: Huading) is a municipality in the district of Passau in Bavaria in Germany. Passau is also the nearest major city, 15 km away.

The municipality of Hutthurm consists of the market town of Hutthurm and more than 40 villages, hamlets and isolated settlements. The most important villages are Hötzdorf, München and Prag, other, smaller ones are Kalteneck, Leoprechting, Niederpretz and Großthannensteig. Hutthurm lies on a hill above the Ilz, Kalteneck in the valley of the Ilz, which flows into the Danube about 15 km further south.

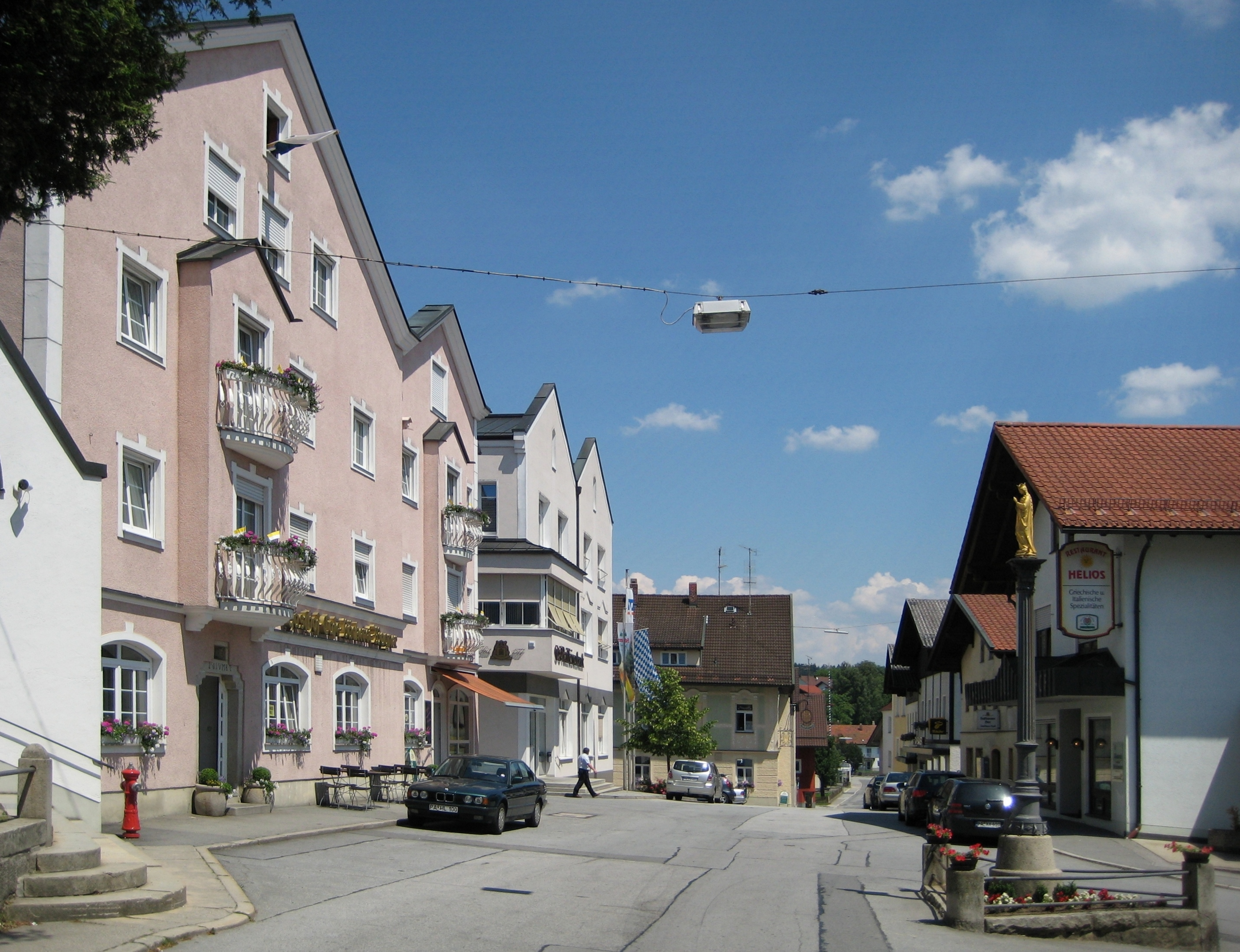
Market Place
