= Ralf Stadler =

German politician (born 1964)

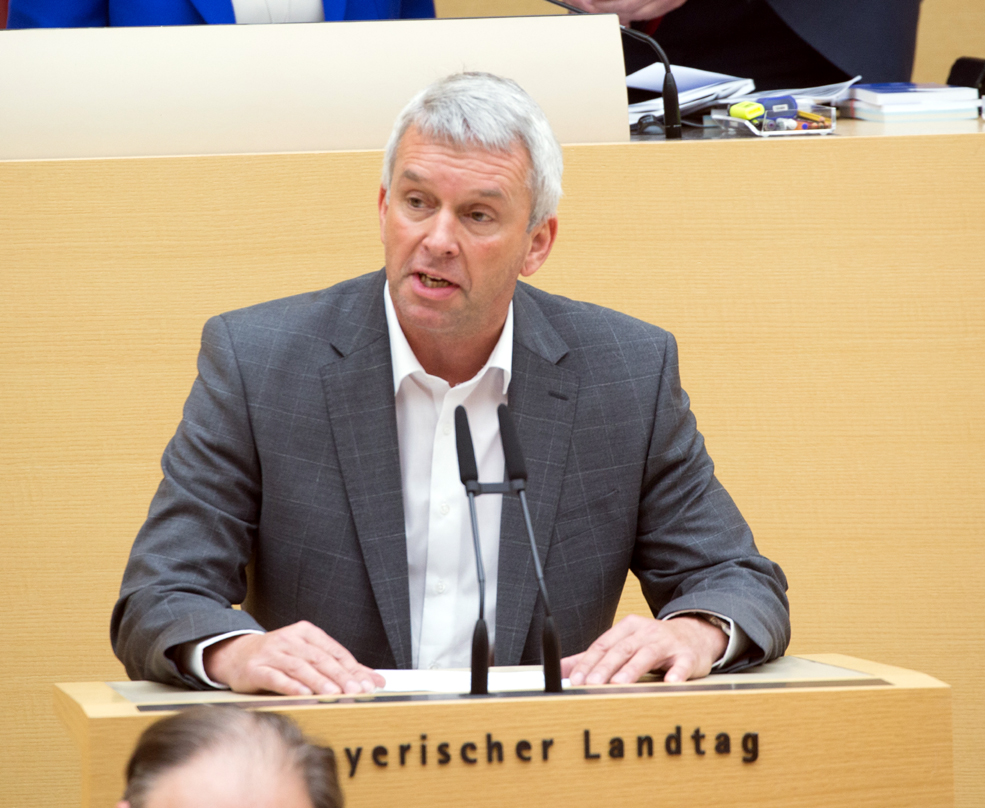
- Stadler in 2019

Member of the Landtag of Bavaria
- Incumbent
- Assumed office 5 November 2018
- Constituency: Lower Bavaria

Personal details
- Born: 31 December 1964 (age 61) Tittling
- Party: Alternative for Germany

Ralf-Dieter Stadler (born 31 December 1964 in Tittling) is a German politician serving as a member of the Landtag of Bavaria since 2018. He has served as chairman of the Alternative for Germany in Passau since 2017.
