= Obernzell =

- Municipality
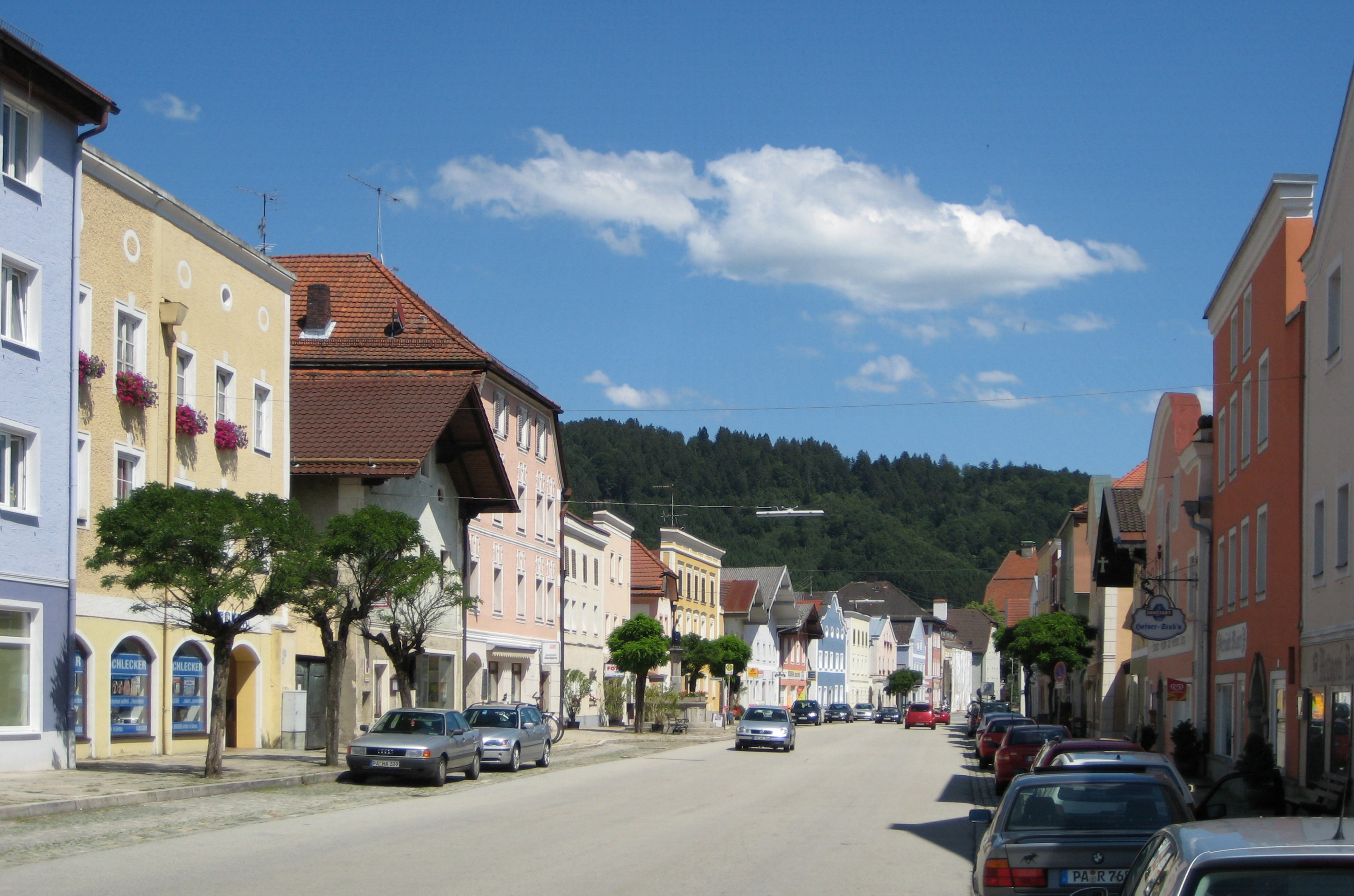
- Market square

- Coat of arms

- Location of Obernzell within Passau district
- Interactive map of Obernzell
- Location within Germany Location within Bavaria
- Coordinates: 48°34′N 13°39′E
- Country: Germany
- State: Bavaria
- Admin. region: Niederbayern
- District: Passau

Government
  - Mayor (2020–26): Ludwig Prügl (CSU)

Area
  - Total: 18.21 km^{2} (7.03 sq mi)
- Elevation: 294 m (965 ft)

Population (2025-12-31)
  - Total: 3,572
  - Density: 196.2/km^{2} (508.0/sq mi)
- Time zone: UTC+01:00 (CET)
  - Summer (DST): UTC+02:00 (CEST)
- Postal codes: 94130
- Dialling codes: 08591
- Vehicle registration: PA
- Website: www.obernzell.de

Obernzell (German pronunciation: [ˈoːbɐntsɛl]; Central Bavarian: Obanzoi) is a municipality in the district of Passau in Bavaria in Germany.

== Geography ==
=== Geographical location ===
Obernzell is located in the Donau-Wald region at the Danube River. The middle of the Danube River forms the border with Upper Austria.

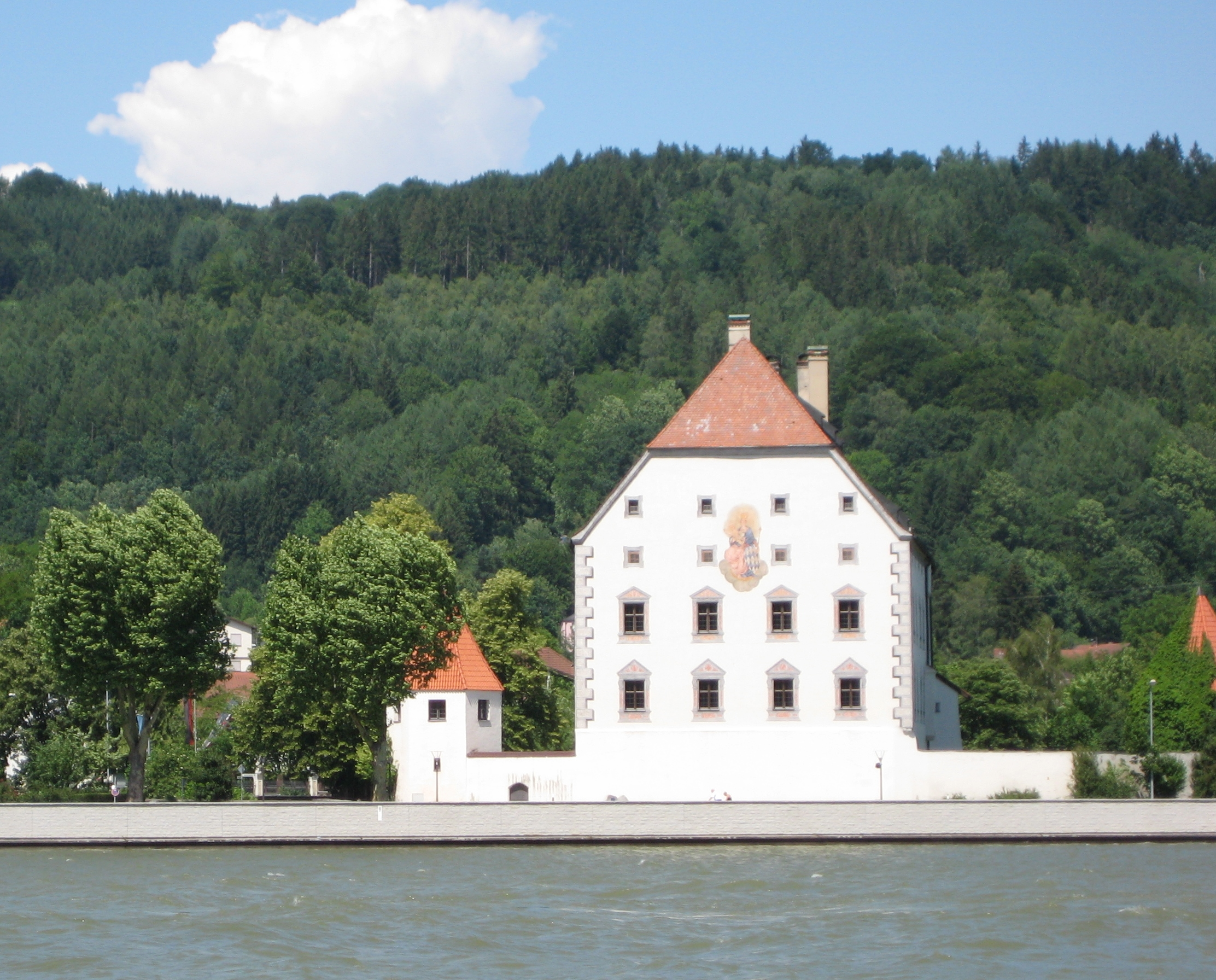
Schloss Obernzell

=== Neighboring communities in Bavaria ===
In Bavaria (Passau district):

- Thyrnau
- Untergriesbach

In Upper Austria:

- Vichtenstein
- Esternberg

=== Constituent communities ===
The Obernzell Municipality contains 21 Districts.:

- Bärnbachmühle
- Breitwies
- Eckerstampf
- Ederlsdorf
- Edlhof
- Erlau
- Figermühle
- Grub
- Haar
- Holzschleife
- Hötzmannsöd
- Leopoldsdorf
- Matzenberg
- Niedernhof
- Nottau
- Obernzell
- Öd
- Ödstadl
- Rackling
- Rollhäusl
- Steinöd

Hammermühle

There are the districts of Ederlsdorf, Kellberg and Obernzell .

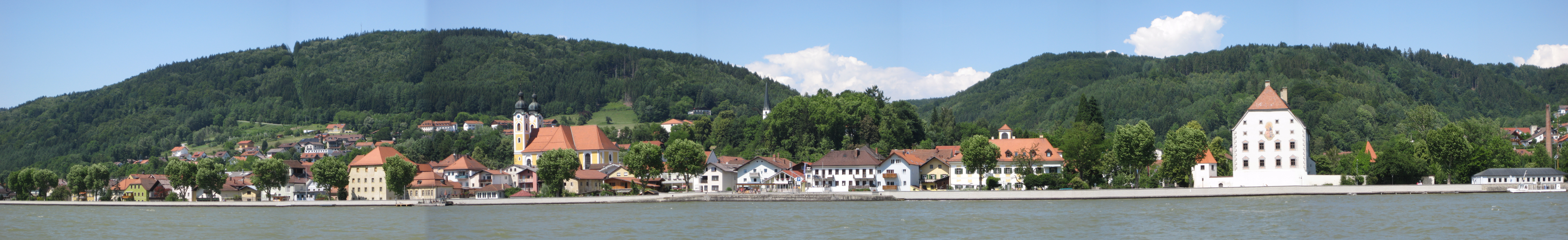
Obernzell

== History ==
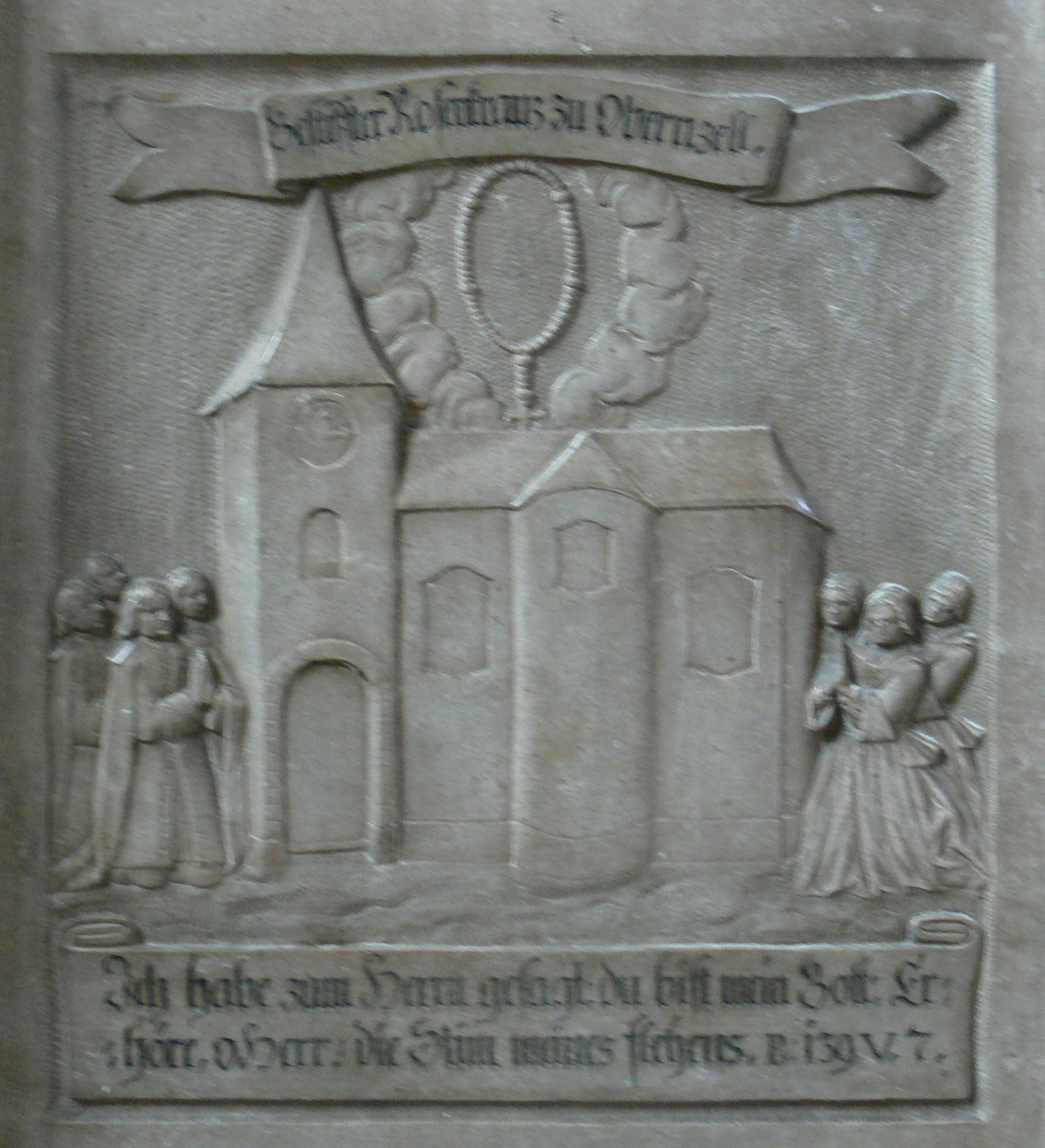
Epitaph Lukas Kern, Schiffermeister

Originating from a monastery, Obernzell was first owned by the Lords of Griesbach and belonged to Bishopric Passau since 1217 as Griesbach at lower market or low-Griesbach in the cell and it further comprised a unit with Untergriesbach. In 1283, it had a parish, in 1359 it was granted market rights. During this time, processing of clay and graphite was the most important economic factor. In 1516 the Obernzeller graphit melting had their own guilds. Around 1530 was the first time Hafner cell named after the potters resident. The crucible prepared consisted of 50% graphite, 40% clay and 10% quartz. They were primarily used by alchemists, metal casters and mints. The crucibles made Obernzell so famous that Bernhard Grueber and Adalbert Müller in 1846 The Bavarian Forest wrote in her book: :

Obernzell notwithstanding its smallness abroad known than many German residence city this reputation it owes the unsurpassable crucibles, which are manufactured here and shipped in half the world

Obernzell ist ungeachtet seiner Kleinheit im Auslande bekannter, als manche deutsche Residenzstadt. Diesen Ruf verdankt es den unübertrefflichen Schmelztiegeln, welche hier verfertigt und in die halbe Welt versendet werden.

=== Incorporations ===
Once an independent municipality, Ederlsdorf was incorporated on July 1, 1972.

=== Population development ===
- 1970: 3.426 Inhabitants
- 1987: 3.425 Inhabitants
- 2000: 3.790 Inhabitants
- 2011: 3.850 Inhabitants
