= Nebling =

Coordinates: 48.5972°N 13.6240°E

Nebling is a small village in the municipality of Untergriesbach in the District of Passau in Lower Bavaria, Germany.
