= Aidenbach =

- Municipality
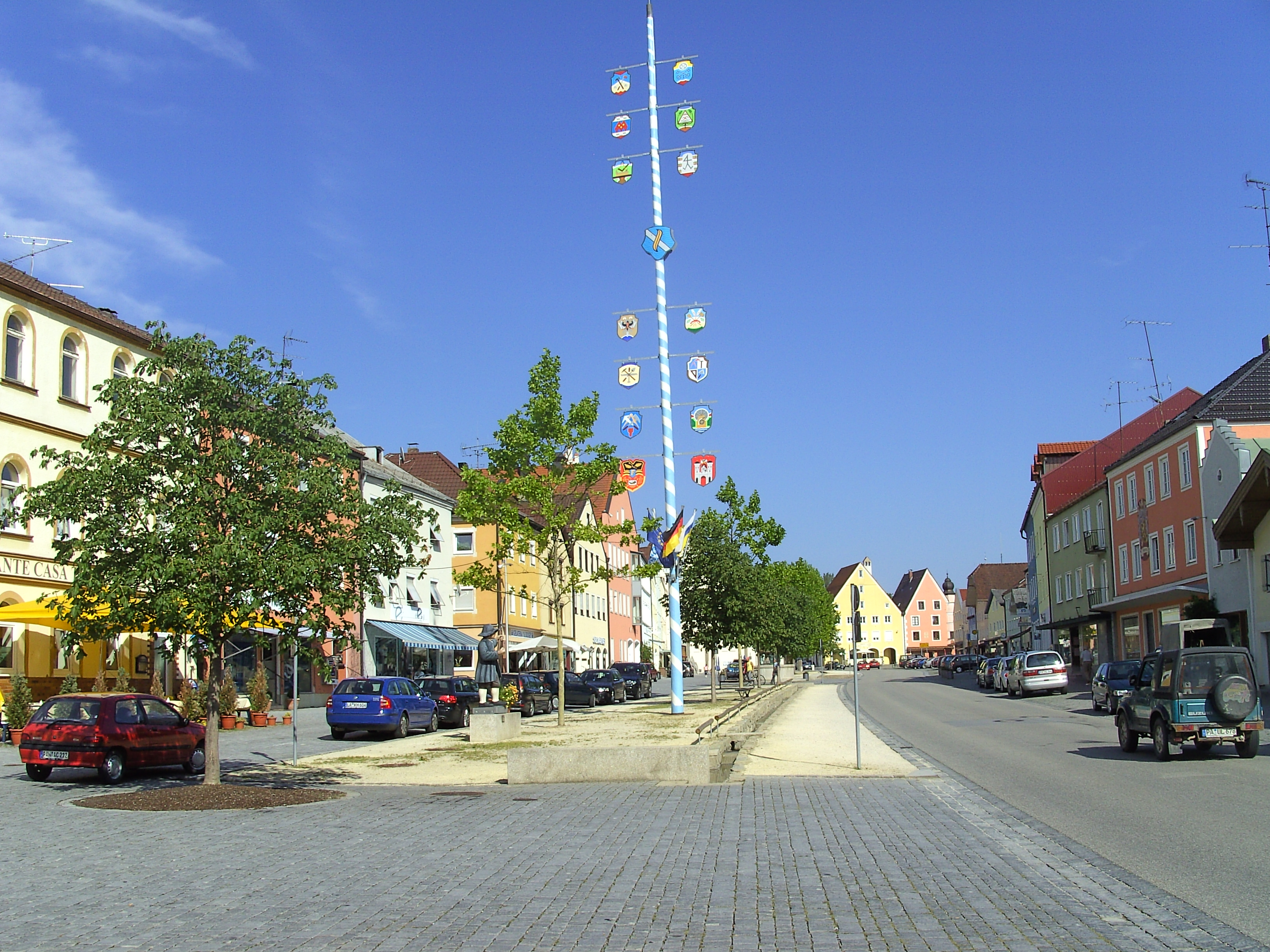
- Market square

- Coat of arms

- Location of Aidenbach within Passau district
- Interactive map of Aidenbach
- Location within Germany Location within Bavaria
- Coordinates: 48°34′N 13°6′E
- Country: Germany
- State: Bavaria
- Admin. region: Niederbayern
- District: Passau
- Municipal assoc.: Aidenbach

Government
  - Mayor (2023–29): Robert Grabler (CSU)

Area
  - Total: 17.1 km^{2} (6.6 sq mi)
- Elevation: 340–400 m (1,120–1,310 ft)

Population (2025-12-31)
  - Total: 3,006
  - Density: 176/km^{2} (455/sq mi)
- Time zone: UTC+01:00 (CET)
  - Summer (DST): UTC+02:00 (CEST)
- Postal codes: 94501
- Dialling codes: 08543
- Vehicle registration: PA
- Website: www.aidenbach.de

Aidenbach (German pronunciation: [ˈaɪdn̩bax]; Central Bavarian: Oambo) is a municipality in the district of Passau in Bavaria in Germany.
