= Tittling (Verwaltungsgemeinschaft) =

- Verwaltungsgemeinschaft
- Location of Tittling within Passau district
- Interactive map of Tittling
- Location within Germany Location within Bavaria
- Coordinates: 48°44′N 13°23′E
- Country: Germany
- State: Bavaria
- Admin. region: Lower Bavaria
- District: Passau
- Seat: Tittling
- Subdivisions: 2 municipalities

Area
  - Total: 39.52 km^{2} (15.26 sq mi)

Population (2025-12-31)
  - Total: 5,761
  - Density: 145.8/km^{2} (377.6/sq mi)
- Time zone: UTC+01:00 (CET)
  - Summer (DST): UTC+02:00 (CEST)
- Website: www.tittling.de

Tittling is a Verwaltungsgemeinschaft (municipal association) in the district of Passau in Bavaria, Germany. Its seat is in Tittling.

It consists of the following municipalities:

1. Tittling
2. Witzmannsberg
