= Aidenbach (Verwaltungsgemeinschaft) =

- Verwaltungsgemeinschaft
- Location of Aidenbach within Passau district
- Interactive map of Aidenbach
- Location within Germany Location within Bavaria
- Coordinates: 48°34′N 13°05′E
- Country: Germany
- State: Bavaria
- Admin. region: Lower Bavaria
- District: Passau
- Seat: Aidenbach
- Subdivisions: 2 municipalities

Area
  - Total: 37.49 km^{2} (14.47 sq mi)

Population (2025-12-31)
  - Total: 4,215
  - Density: 112.4/km^{2} (291.2/sq mi)
- Time zone: UTC+01:00 (CET)
  - Summer (DST): UTC+02:00 (CEST)
- Website: www.aidenbach.de

Aidenbach is a Verwaltungsgemeinschaft (municipal association) in the district of Passau in Bavaria, Germany. Its seat is in Aidenbach.

It consists of the following municipalities:

1. Aidenbach
2. Beutelsbach
