= Neuhaus am Inn =

- Municipality
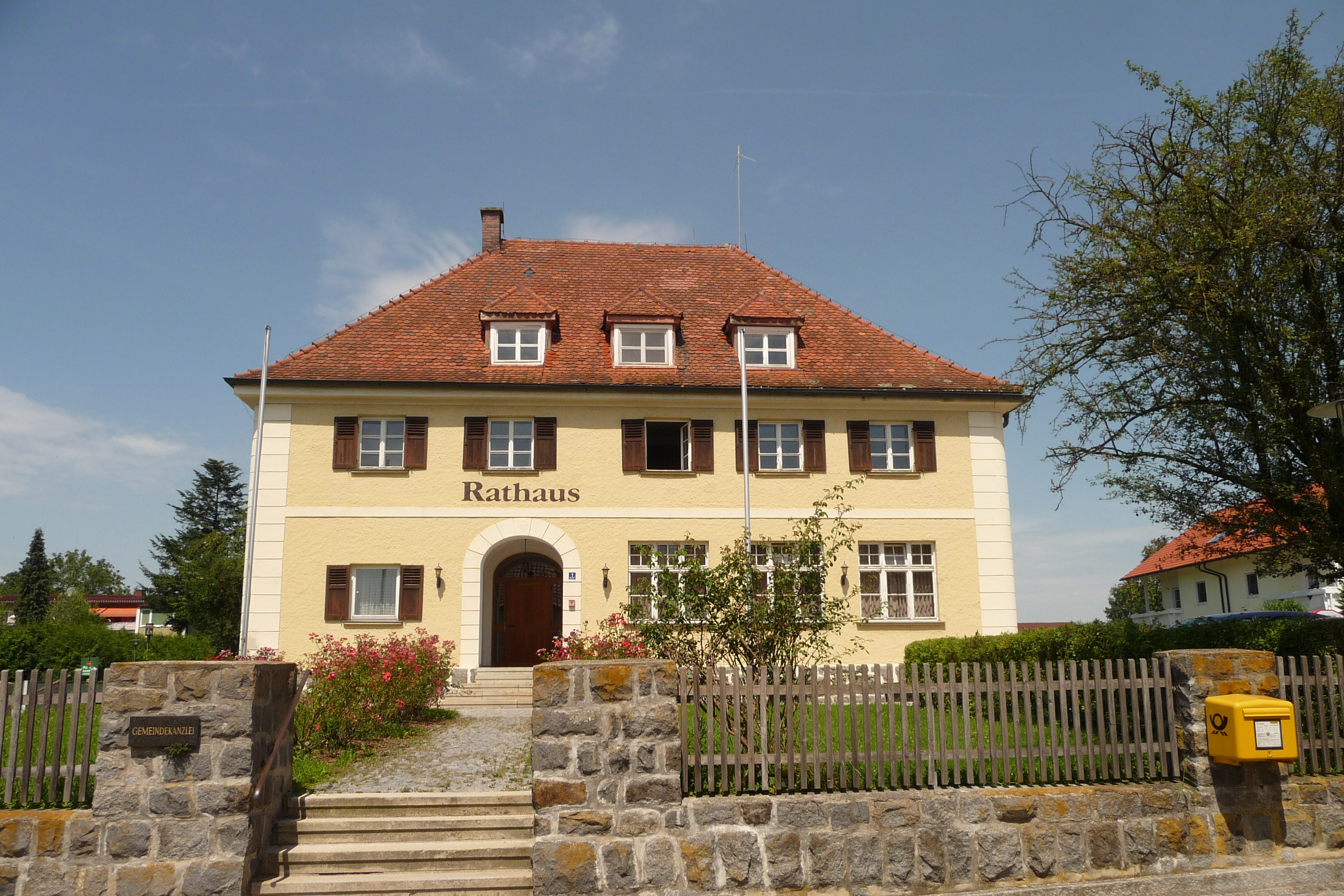
- Town hall

- Coat of arms

- Location of Neuhaus am Inn within Passau district
- Interactive map of Neuhaus am Inn
- Location within Germany Location within Bavaria
- Coordinates: 48°28′N 13°26′E
- Country: Germany
- State: Bavaria
- Admin. region: Niederbayern
- District: Passau

Government
  - Mayor (2020–26): Stephan Dorn (CSU)

Area
  - Total: 31.07 km^{2} (12.00 sq mi)
- Elevation: 323 m (1,060 ft)

Population (2025-12-31)
  - Total: 3,433
  - Density: 110.5/km^{2} (286.2/sq mi)
- Time zone: UTC+01:00 (CET)
  - Summer (DST): UTC+02:00 (CEST)
- Postal codes: 94152
- Dialling codes: 08503
- Vehicle registration: PA
- Website: www.neuhaus-inn.de

Neuhaus am Inn (German pronunciation: [ˈnɔʏhaʊs ʔam ˈʔɪn], lit. 'Neuhaus on the Inn') is a municipality in the district of Passau in Bavaria in Germany.
