= Rotthalmünster (Verwaltungsgemeinschaft) =

- Verwaltungsgemeinschaft
- Location of Rotthalmünster within Passau district
- Interactive map of Rotthalmünster
- Location within Germany Location within Bavaria
- Coordinates: 48°22′N 13°12′E
- Country: Germany
- State: Bavaria
- Admin. region: Lower Bavaria
- District: Passau
- Seat: Rotthalmünster
- Subdivisions: 2 municipalities

Area
  - Total: 69.79 km^{2} (26.95 sq mi)

Population (2025-12-31)
  - Total: 5,881
  - Density: 84.27/km^{2} (218.3/sq mi)
- Time zone: UTC+01:00 (CET)
  - Summer (DST): UTC+02:00 (CEST)
- Website: www.rotthalmuenster.de

Rotthalmünster is a Verwaltungsgemeinschaft (municipal association) in the district of Passau in Bavaria, Germany. Its seat is in Rotthalmünster.

It consists of the following municipalities:

1. Malching
2. Rotthalmünster
