= Witzmannsberg =

- Municipality
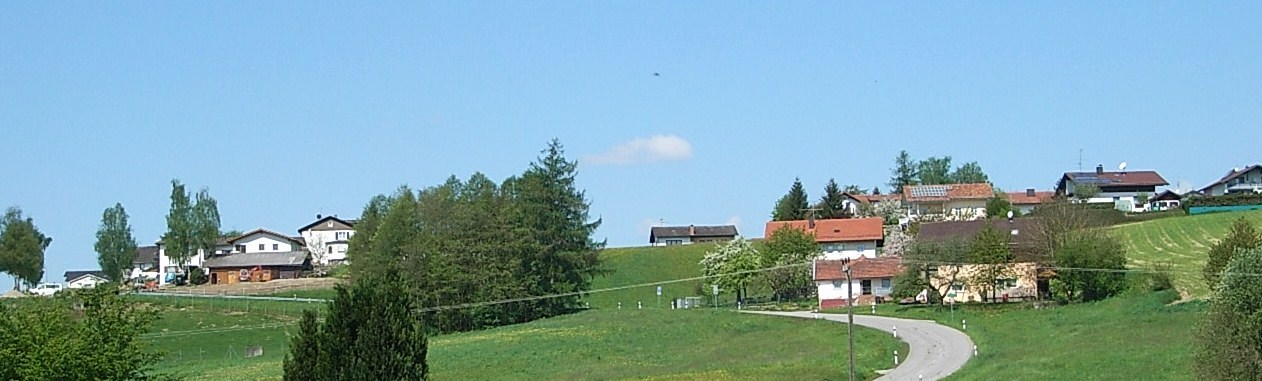
- Witzmannsberg

- Coat of arms

- Location of Witzmannsberg within Passau district
- Interactive map of Witzmannsberg
- Location within Germany Location within Bavaria
- Coordinates: 48°43′N 13°25′E
- Country: Germany
- State: Bavaria
- Admin. region: Niederbayern
- District: Passau
- Municipal assoc.: Tittling

Government
  - Mayor (2020–26): Josef Schuh (CSU)

Area
  - Total: 18.73 km^{2} (7.23 sq mi)
- Elevation: 495 m (1,624 ft)

Population (2025-12-31)
  - Total: 1,555
  - Density: 83.02/km^{2} (215.0/sq mi)
- Time zone: UTC+01:00 (CET)
  - Summer (DST): UTC+02:00 (CEST)
- Postal codes: 94104
- Dialling codes: 08504
- Vehicle registration: PA
- Website: www.witzmannsberg.de

Witzmannsberg is a municipality in the district of Passau in Bavaria in Germany.
