= Bavarian Forest Museum Village =

- Museumsdorf Bayerischer Wald
- Established: 1974
- Coordinates: 48°44′24.4″N 13°21′0.71″E
- Type: open air museum
- Founder: Georg Höltl

The Bavarian Forest Museum Village (German: Museumsdorf Bayerischer Wald) is an open air museum near Tittling on the southwestern shore of the Dreiburgensee lake in the Bavarian Forest. It covers about 25 hectares and has over 150 buildings from the period from 1580 to 1850 and a local history collection with 60,000 items. It is thus one of the largest open air museums in Europe.

The museum was founded in 1974 by Georg Höltl with the restoration of the 500-year-old Rothau Mill (Rothaumühle). This building which, following the collapse of its roof timbers in 1972, had been sold by Georg and Centa Höltl, still stands on its original site below the Dreiburgensee. Since then, numerous buildings from across the Bavarian Forest have been transported to the museum. Among the types of building on show are farmhouses, day labourers' houses, chapels, the oldest village school in Germany, workshops and mills. The comprehensive local history collection includes holy articles, farm furniture and household effects, clothing, agricultural tools, jewellery, glass products and carts. Several times a year, a large farmer's market takes place in the museum village, where there are many stalls and demonstrations of old customs and handicrafts.

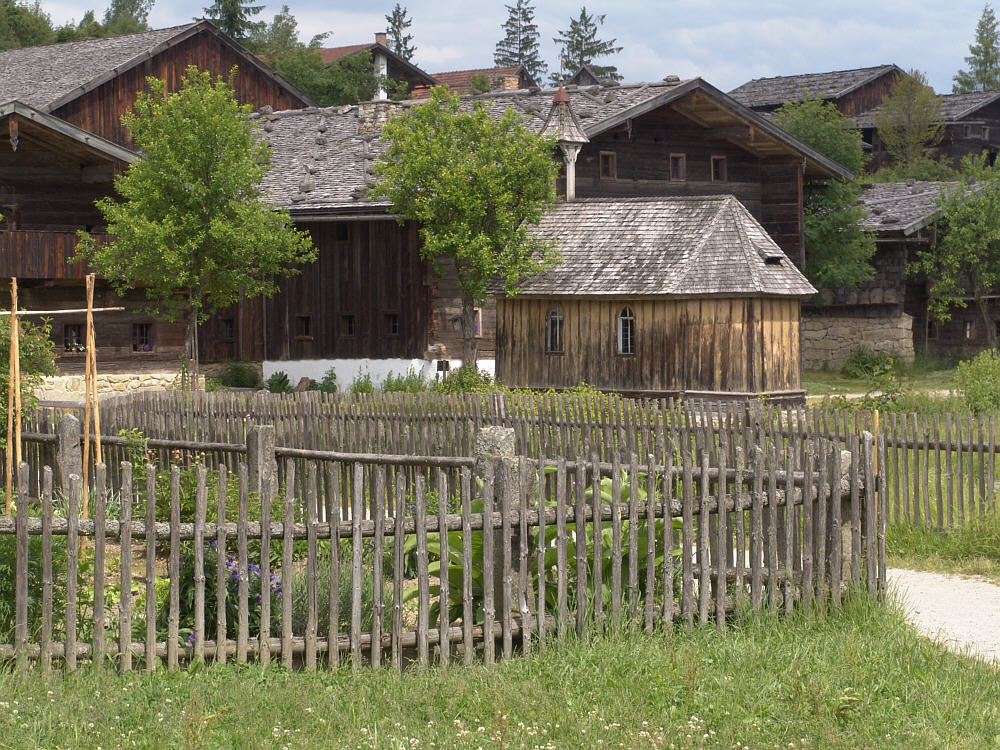
Bavarian Forest Museum Village near Tittling

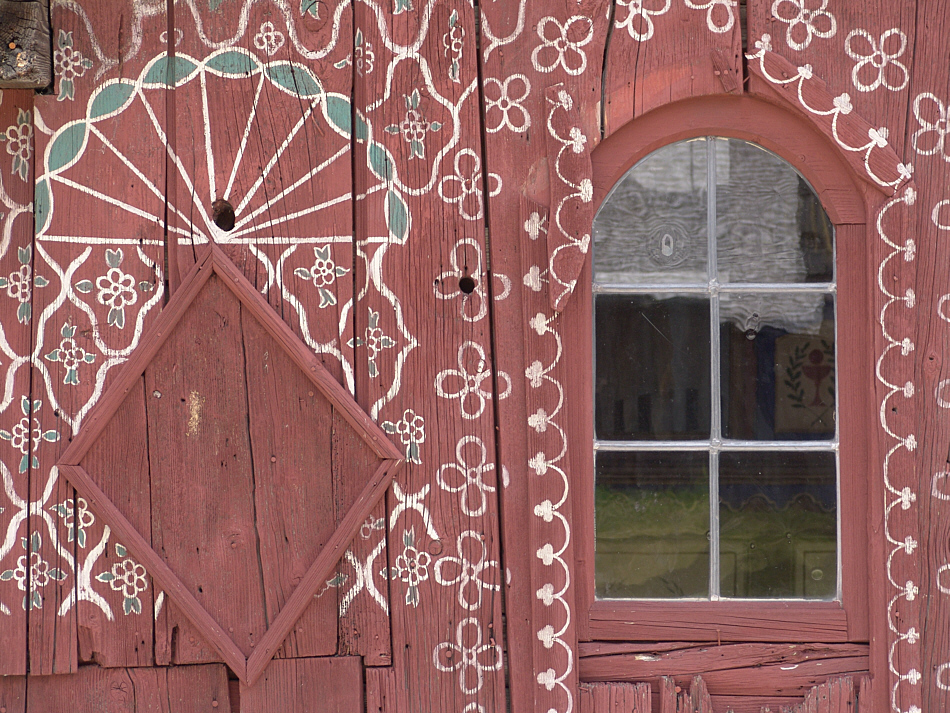
The pilgrimage chapel of Our Lady of Good Help (Maria vom Guten Rat) from Thierham

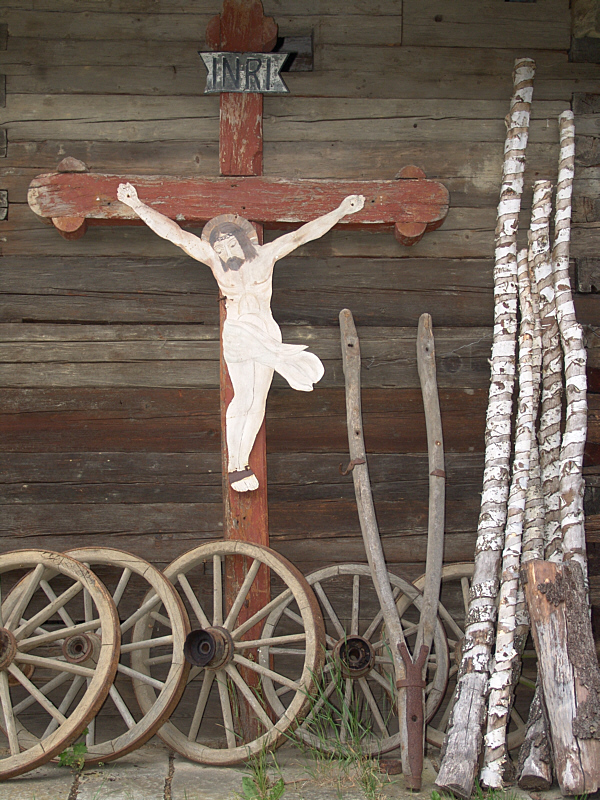
Laminated cross

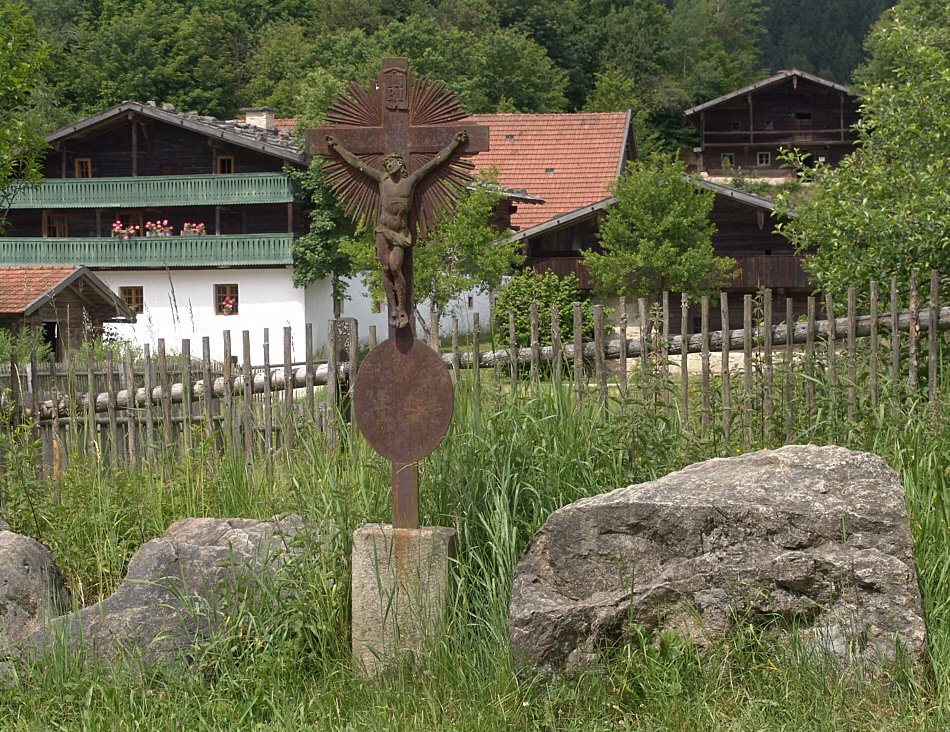
View into the museum village

== Literature ==
- Höltl, Georg (2004). Museumsdorf Bayerischer Wald in der Liste National wertvolles Kulturgut; Chronik 1974 - 2004 (in German). Tittling. ISBN 978-3-927218-71-0. OCLC 220471249.
- Museumsdorf Bayerischer Wald Thurmansbang (2009). Museumsbegleiter (in German). Tittling. ISBN 978-3-927218-69-7. OCLC 823228530.
- Mitgutsch, Otti; Museumsdorf Bayerischer Wald Thurmansbang (2003). Das Kinderbuch vom Museumsdorf Bayerischer Wald (in German). Tiefenbach. ISBN 978-3-927108-63-9. OCLC 76550303.
- Hartl, Hans; / Merz, Heinrich: Die älteste Volksschule Deutschlands. Tittling, 1981, 171 pp. ISBN 978-3927218055
- Museumsdorf Bayerischer Wald; Kuba, Martina; Lischke, Claudia; Schuster, Raimund (1990). Zeugnisse der Volksfrömmigkeit : religiöse Volkskunst, religiöses Volksleben im Bayerischen Wald, volkstümliche Hinterglasbilder; [Führer durch die Ausstellung] (in German). Tittling/Passau: Höltl. OCLC 75978171.

== See also ==
- List of open-air and living museums
