= Malching =

- Municipality
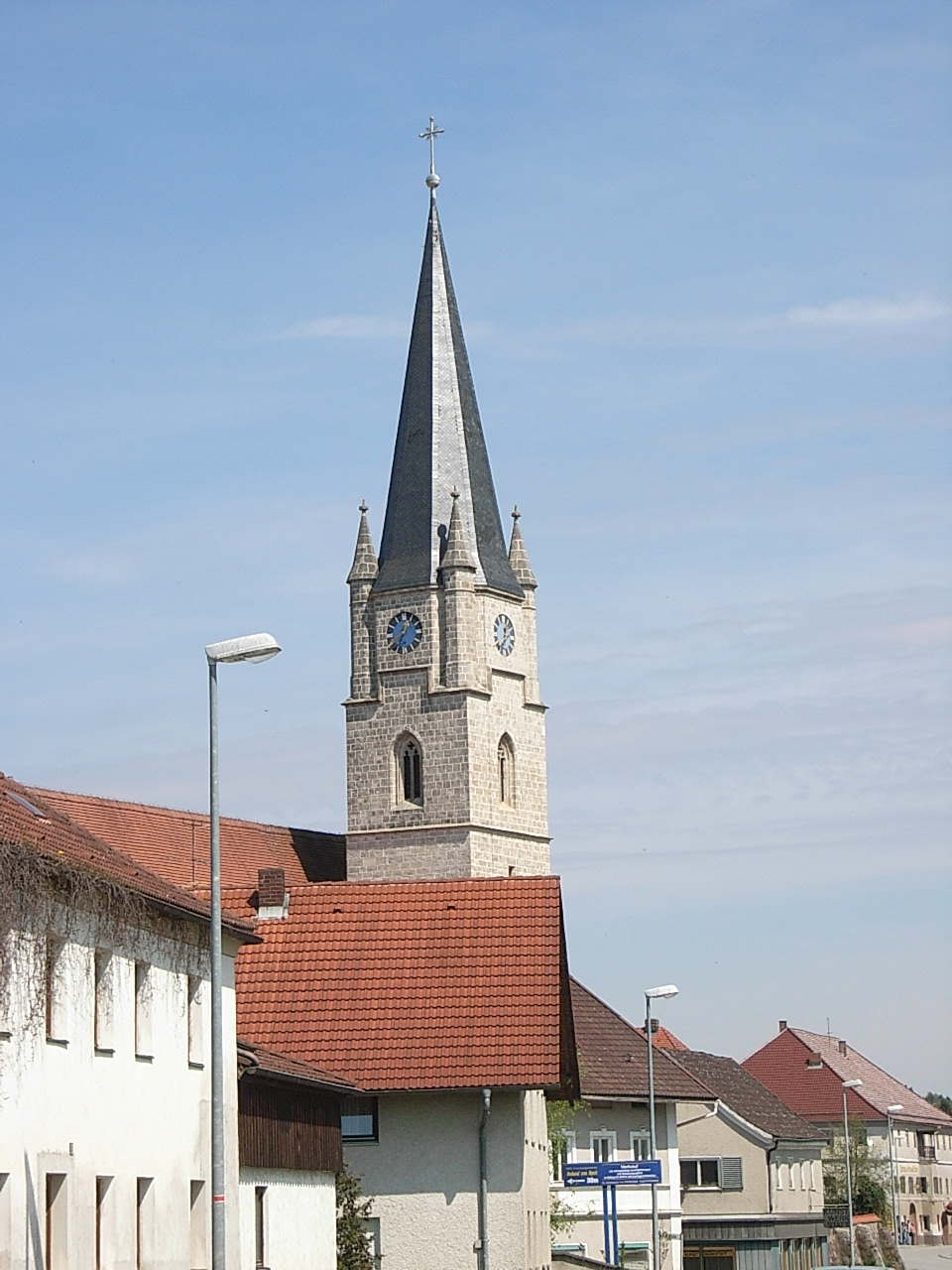
- Saint Aegidius Church

- Coat of arms

- Location of Malching within Passau district
- Interactive map of Malching
- Location within Germany Location within Bavaria
- Coordinates: 48°19′N 13°12′E
- Country: Germany
- State: Bavaria
- Admin. region: Niederbayern
- District: Passau
- Municipal assoc.: Rotthalmünster

Government
  - Mayor (2020–26): Georg Hofer (CSU)

Area
  - Total: 25.24 km^{2} (9.75 sq mi)
- Elevation: 345–520 m (1,132–1,706 ft)

Population (2025-12-31)
  - Total: 1,221
  - Density: 48.38/km^{2} (125.3/sq mi)
- Time zone: UTC+01:00 (CET)
  - Summer (DST): UTC+02:00 (CEST)
- Postal codes: 94094
- Dialling codes: 08573
- Vehicle registration: PA
- Website: www.malching.de

Malching (German pronunciation: [ˈmalçɪŋ]) is a municipality in the district of Passau in Bavaria in Germany.
