= Untergriesbach =

- Municipality
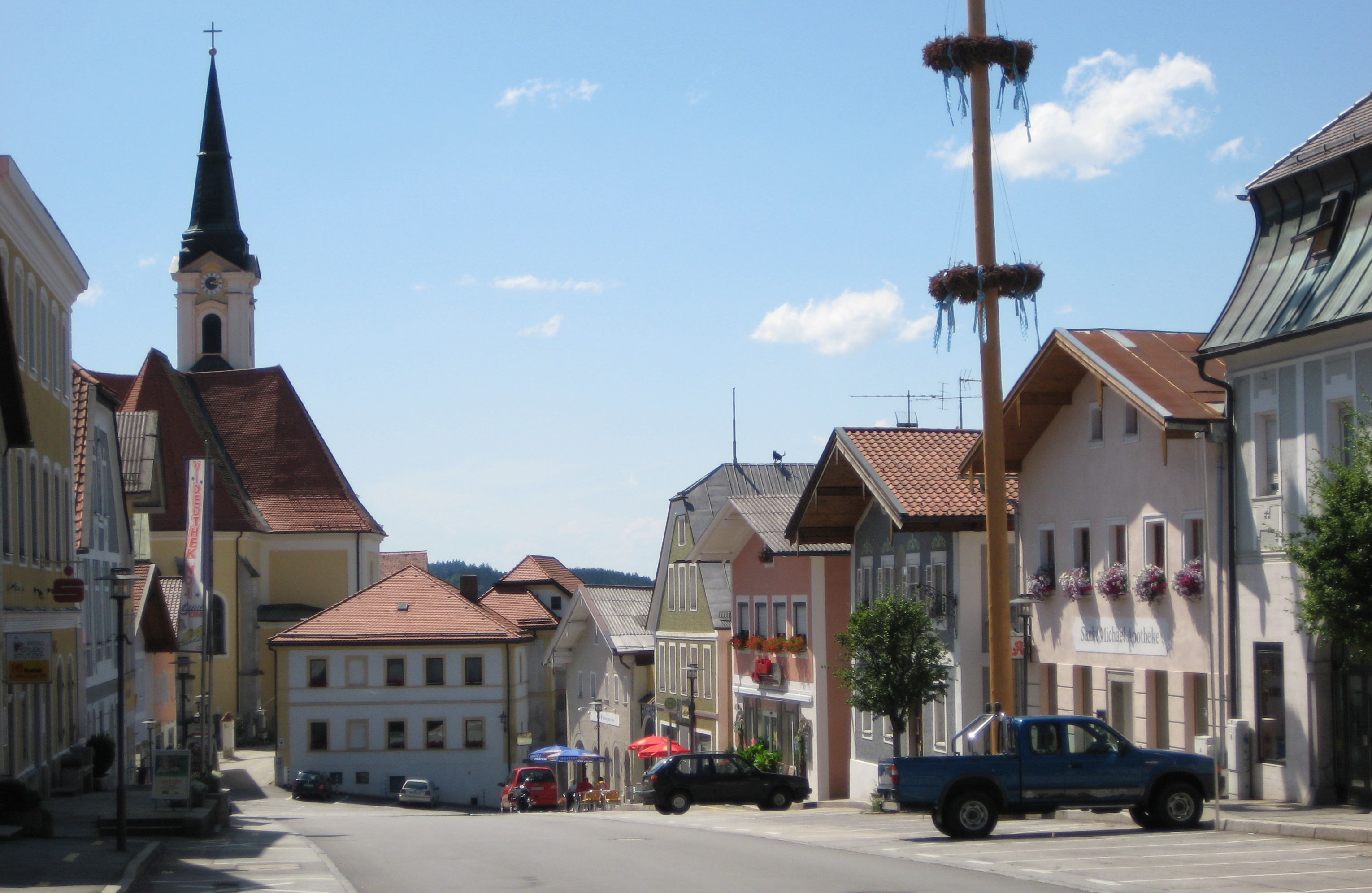
- Market square

- Coat of arms

- Location of Untergriesbach within Passau district
- Interactive map of Untergriesbach
- Location within Germany Location within Bavaria
- Coordinates: 48°34′30″N 13°40′5″E
- Country: Germany
- State: Bavaria
- Admin. region: Niederbayern
- District: Passau

Government
  - Mayor (2024–30): Hermann Duschl

Area
  - Total: 73.60 km^{2} (28.42 sq mi)
- Elevation: 556 m (1,824 ft)

Population (2025-12-31)
  - Total: 6,021
  - Density: 81.81/km^{2} (211.9/sq mi)
- Time zone: UTC+01:00 (CET)
  - Summer (DST): UTC+02:00 (CEST)
- Postal codes: 94107
- Dialling codes: 08593
- Vehicle registration: PA
- Website: www.untergriesbach.de

Untergriesbach (Central Bavarian: Untagriasbo) is a municipality in the district of Passau in Bavaria in Germany.

== Geography ==
Untergriesbach is located in the southern Bavarian Forest and extends high above the deep valley of the Danube. The height of the market town is 565 meters above sea level. Via the Bundesstraße 388 it is connected to Passau (22 km) and in the opposite direction to the Upper Austrian Haslach (32 km).

Untergriesbach in Passau district

== History ==
The name comes from the nobles of Griesbach. These were a rich noble family with numerous possessions in the "land of the Abbey" (Passauer Abbey Country). Nothing remains from the former castle.

Originally it was named "Griespach", then "Griesbach on high market" (to distinguish it from "Griesbach in the cell" = Obernzell) and finally renamed in 1806 to Untergriesbach (to distinguish it from Bad Griesbach in the Rott Valley).

The nobles of Griesbach died out in the early 13th century. Their successors were the Wessenberger who possessed an extended property as a fief of the Bishopric Passau. The castle was probably destroyed after the death of the last Wessenberger around 1240.

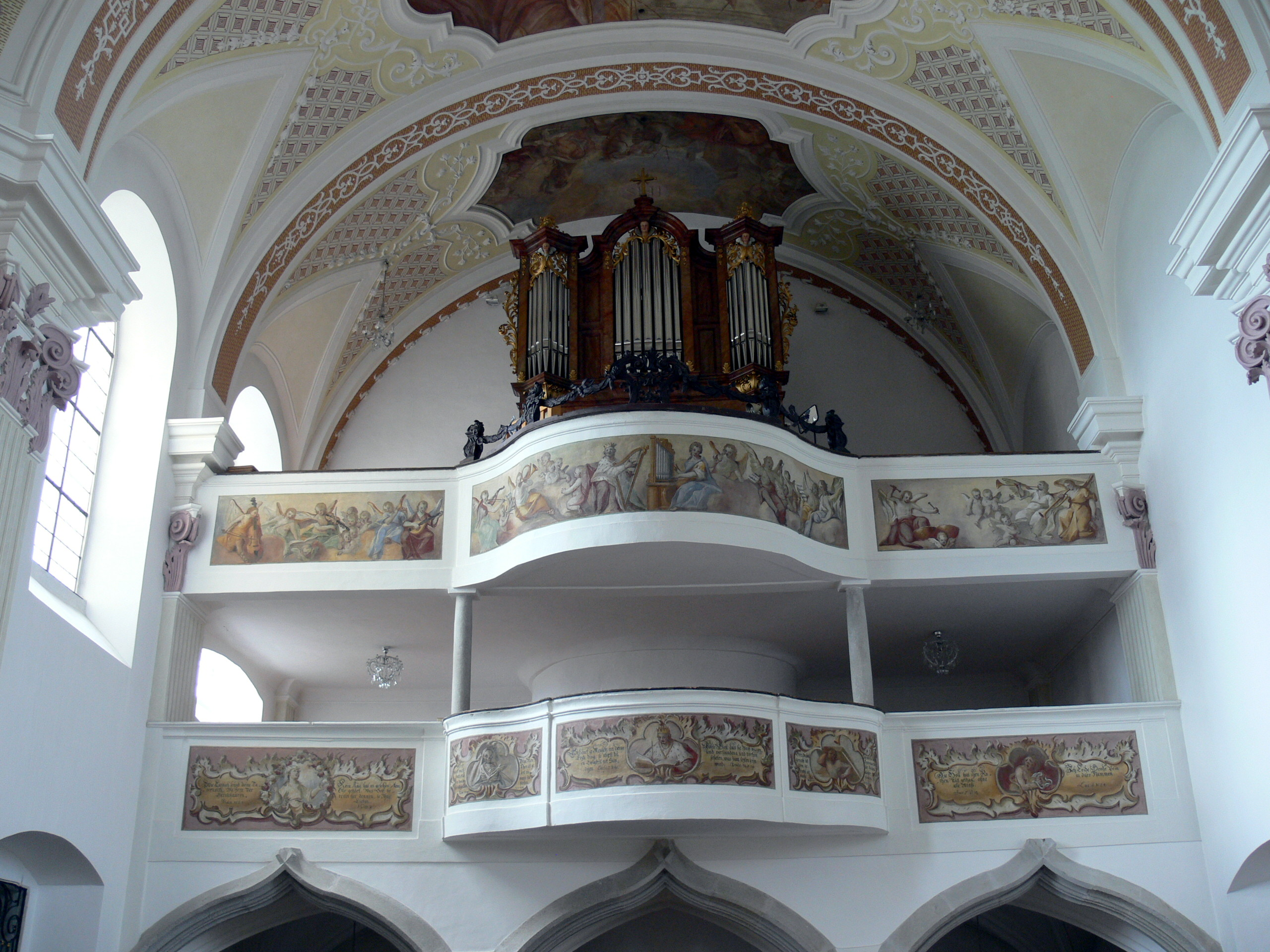
Organ in St Michael's Church

1260 Bishop Otto of Lonsdorf (approx. 1200–1265) gave the rights to hold a market and other privileges. During the Passau citizens revolt against Bishop Albert III. von Winkel (died 1380) Untergriesbach was burned down 1367 by insurgents from Passau. In 1456 Bishop Ulrich of Nussdorf confirmed and extended the rights and freedoms of the market.

Untergriesbach was largely spared from Thirty Years' War, but the Bavarian and Imperial troops, who were billeted here, imported in 1648 the plague during the last year of the war, which raged until early 1650 with great violence.

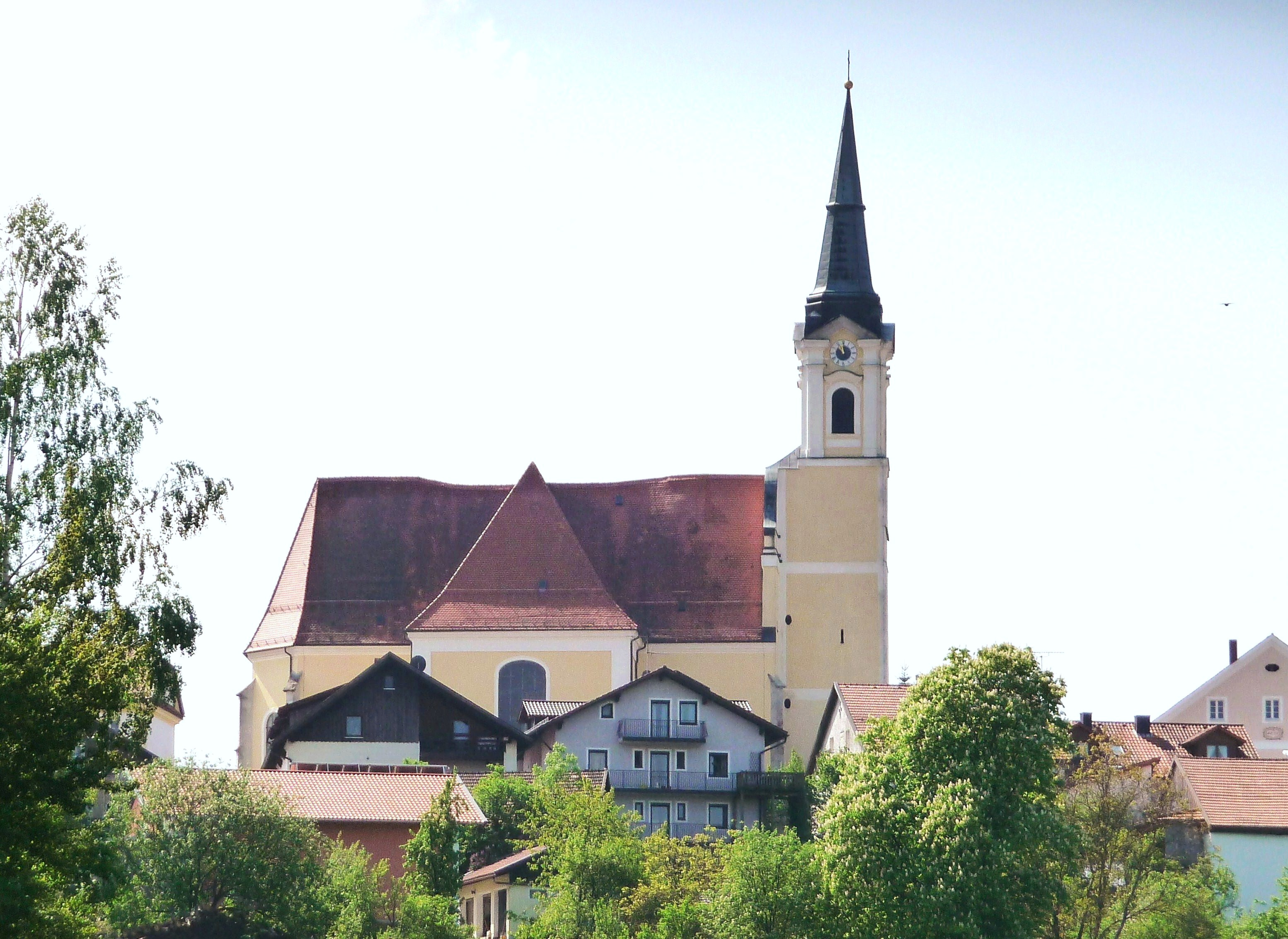
Gothic parish church of St. Michael

The late Gothic parish church of St. Michael was remodeled baroque in several stages during the 18th century. In 1803 the market Griesbach came to Ferdinand III, Grand Duke of Tuscany (1769–1824) and 1806 to Kingdom of Bavaria. The trader Georg Saxinger was elected the first mayor. 1829 a new school building was erected, from 1829 to 1830 was built a new road to Obernzell, which was much more comfortable to drive than the old mountain road.

In 1903 the name of the municipality Griesbach was officially changed to Untergriesbach.

1956 was built in the area of the municipality the water power plant Jochenstein.

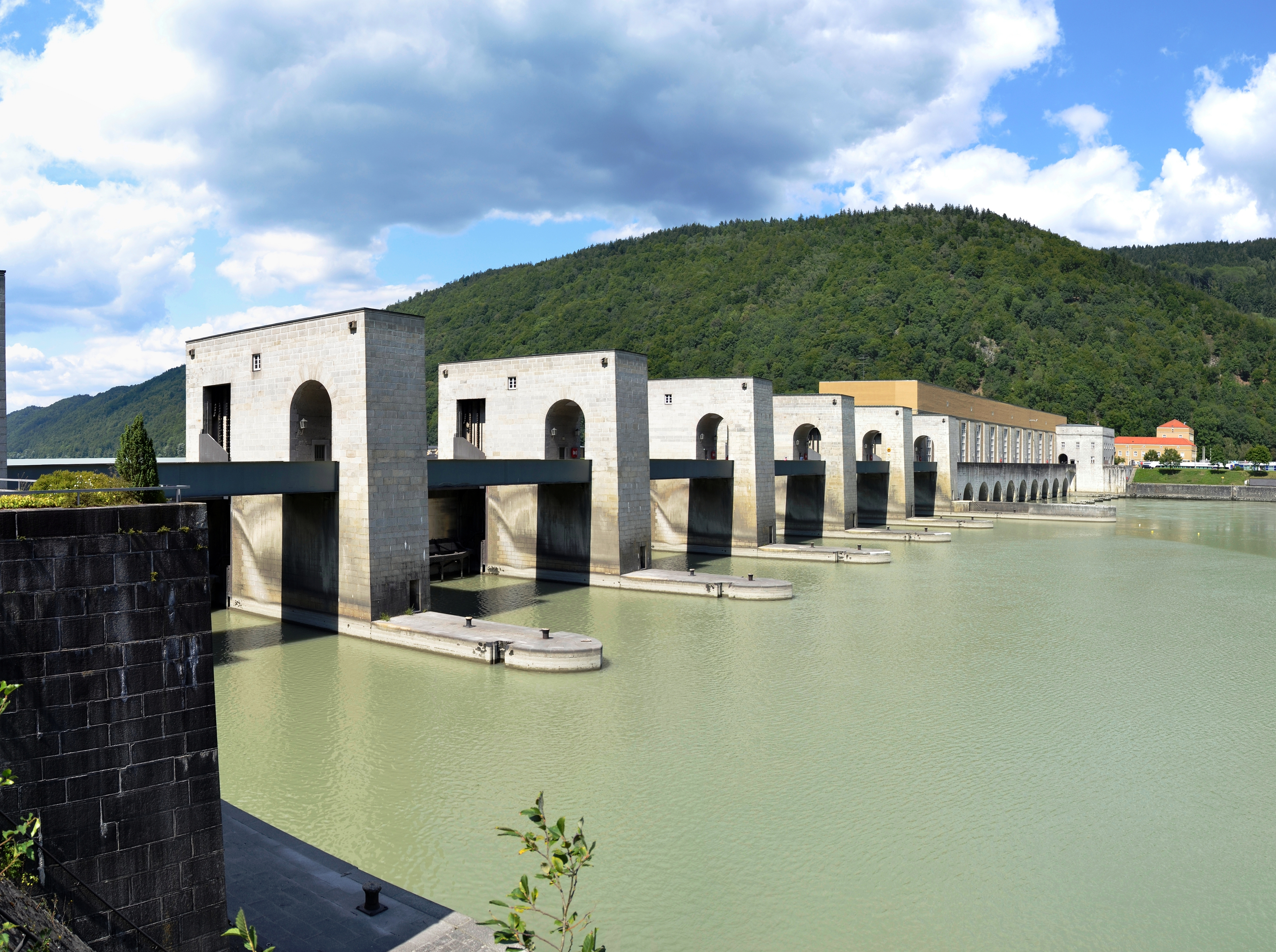
Jochenstein power plant 2012

== Municipality arrangement ==
Untergriesbach has 106 districts:

- Bachhäusl
- Berghof
- Brunnreut
- Dienberg
- Diendorf
- Dürrmühle
- Eck
- Eckersäg
- Eckerstampf
- Eckmühle
- Endsfelden
- Feldhäuslhäusl
- Ficht
- Fichtwiesen
- Friedlgrub
- Gammertshof
- Gebrechtshof
- Gebrechtsmühle
- Glotzing
- Gotting
- Gottsdorf
- Grögöd
- Grub
- Grunau
- Habersdorf
- Hamet
- Hanzing
- Hastorf
- Haunersdorf
- Herrenwies
- Hinterkühberg
- Hintersäg
- Hitzing
- Hochreut
- Hochwiesl
- Höhenberg
- Holzhäusl
- Hubing
- Hundsruck
- Jochenstein
- Kagerreut
- Kappelgarten
- Kinzesberg
- Knapphäusl
- Knittlmühle
- Kohlbachmühle
- Kroding
- Kronawitten
- Kronawitthof
- Krottenthal
- Kühberg
- Lämersdorf
- Leizesberg
- Linden
- Lindlmühle
- Mairau
- Mittereck
- Mitterreut
- Nebling
- Neureuth
- Niederdorf
- Oberöd
- Oberötzdorf
- Oberreut
- Ochsenreut
- Ornatsöd
- Paulusberg
- Pfaffenreut
- Priel
- Ramesberg
- Rampersdorf
- Ratzing
- Rechab
- Reut
- Richtermühle
- Riedl
- Riedlerhof
- Roll
- Rothkreuz
- Saxing
- Schaibing
- Schergendorf
- Scherleinsöd
- Schreinerhäusl
- Spechting
- Sperrhäusl
- Steinbruck
- Steinbüchl
- Stollberg
- Stollbergmühle
- Tabakstampf
- Taubing
- Untergriesbach
- Unteröd
- Unterötzdorf
- Unterreut
- Vorholz
- Waldfriede
- Weidwies
- Wesseslinden
- Willersdorf
- Würm
- Würmmühle
- Zaunbrechl
- Ziering
- Zipf

== Incorporations ==
On 1 October 1971, the previously independent municipality Lambsdorf was incorporated. On 1 January 1972, Gottsdorf and Schaibing were added. Oberötzdorf followed on 1 March 1972.

== Transport ==
A railway terminal was built in 1904 in Schaibing, located at the Passau-Hauzenberg railway. On this route the passenger transport ended in 1970, the freight transport ended in 1997. There are efforts to reactivate this route.

In 1912, Untergriesbach got connected to the Passau–Hauzenberg railway by a Rack railway. Rail traffic ceased in 1965, and in 1975, the track Obernzell-Wegscheid was removed.

== Town council ==
The town council has been elected in the local elections on 15 March 2020 as follows:

Party	Seats	Vote Share
CSU	5	28,30 %
SPD	3	14,40 %
Freie Wählergemeinschaft	5	24,40 %
Christliche Wählergemeinschaft	4	19,60 %
Bürgerforum Gottsdorf	3	13,30 %
Total	20	100 %

== Crest ==
Blazon: "Argent, a left-facing rising red wolf."

== Educational institutions ==
- Kindergarten
- Primary and secondary school
- Gymnasium Untergriesbach

== Culture ==
- Twinned city is Civezzano (Trentino, Italy)
- A festival is held every three years in the second weekend in July in conjunction with the local history days (Heimattage).

== Attractions ==
- St Michael, late gothic parish church, refurbished in the 18th in the baroque style
- Village chapel, built from 1765 to 1768
- Parish Church of St. Jakob (Elder) in Gottsdorf
- Pillory from 1490 as a sign of the former low jurisdiction of the market

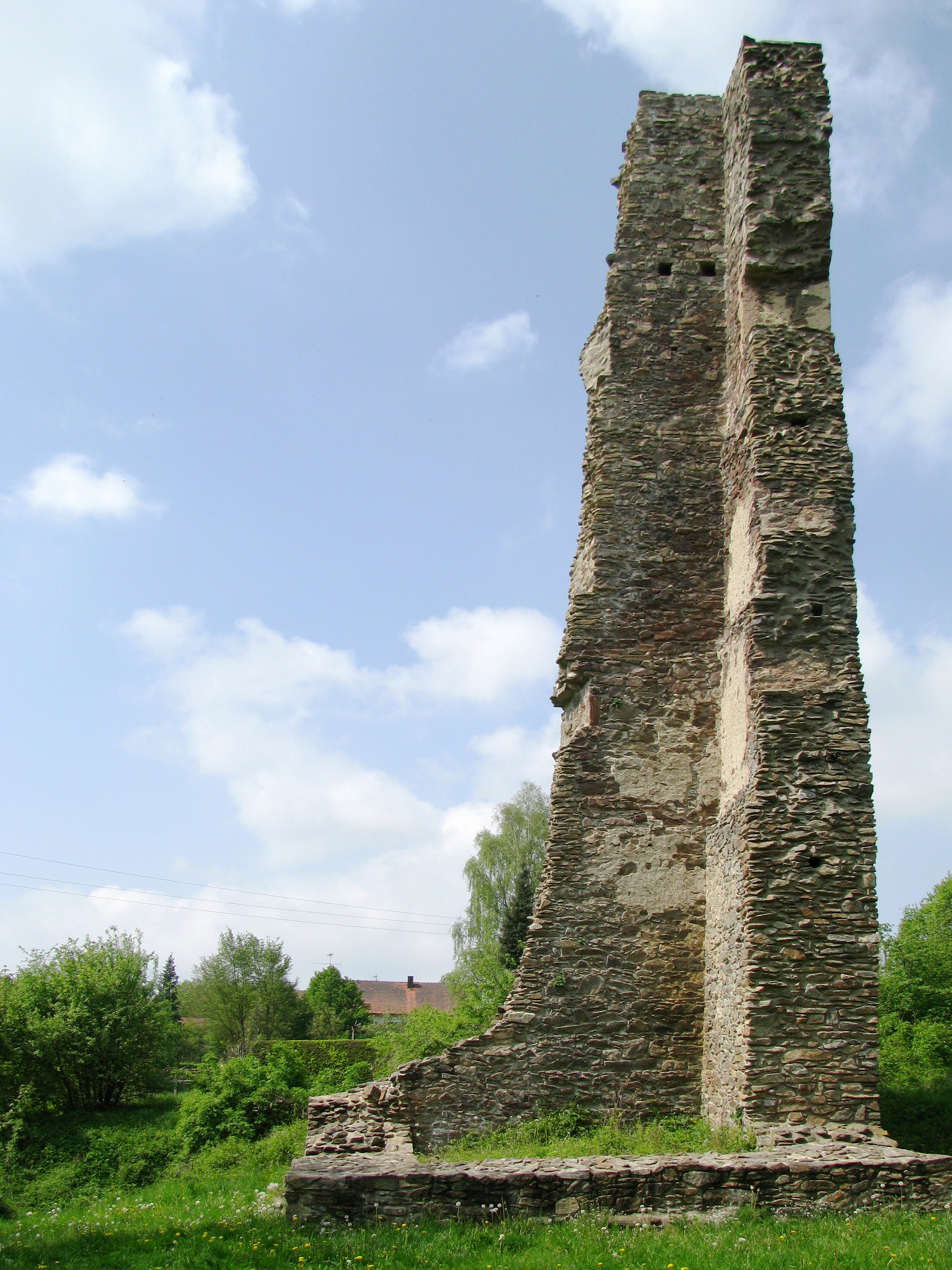
Ruin of Neujochenstein Castle

- Ruins Castle Altjochenstein and Castle Neujochenstein

== People from Untergriesbach ==
- Christian Goller (born 1943 in Untergriesbach), German painter and art restorer
- Ottfried Fischer (born 1953 in Ornatsöd), actor and kabarett artist
- Theoderich Hagn (born 23. March 1816 in Untergriesbach), Abbot of Lambach
- Friedrich Oberneder (born 25 September 1891 in Pölzöd), theologian and poet
- Rudolf Wimmer (born 10 April 1849 in Gottsdorf), painter

== Sports and teams ==
- The largest association of the town is the sports-club SV Untergriesbach with approximately 850 members.
- The veterans of the world wars, former and active soldiers of the Bundeswehr are organized in the soldiers and veterans associations in Untergriesbach, Schaibing and Gottsorf respectively.
