= Tittling =

- Municipality
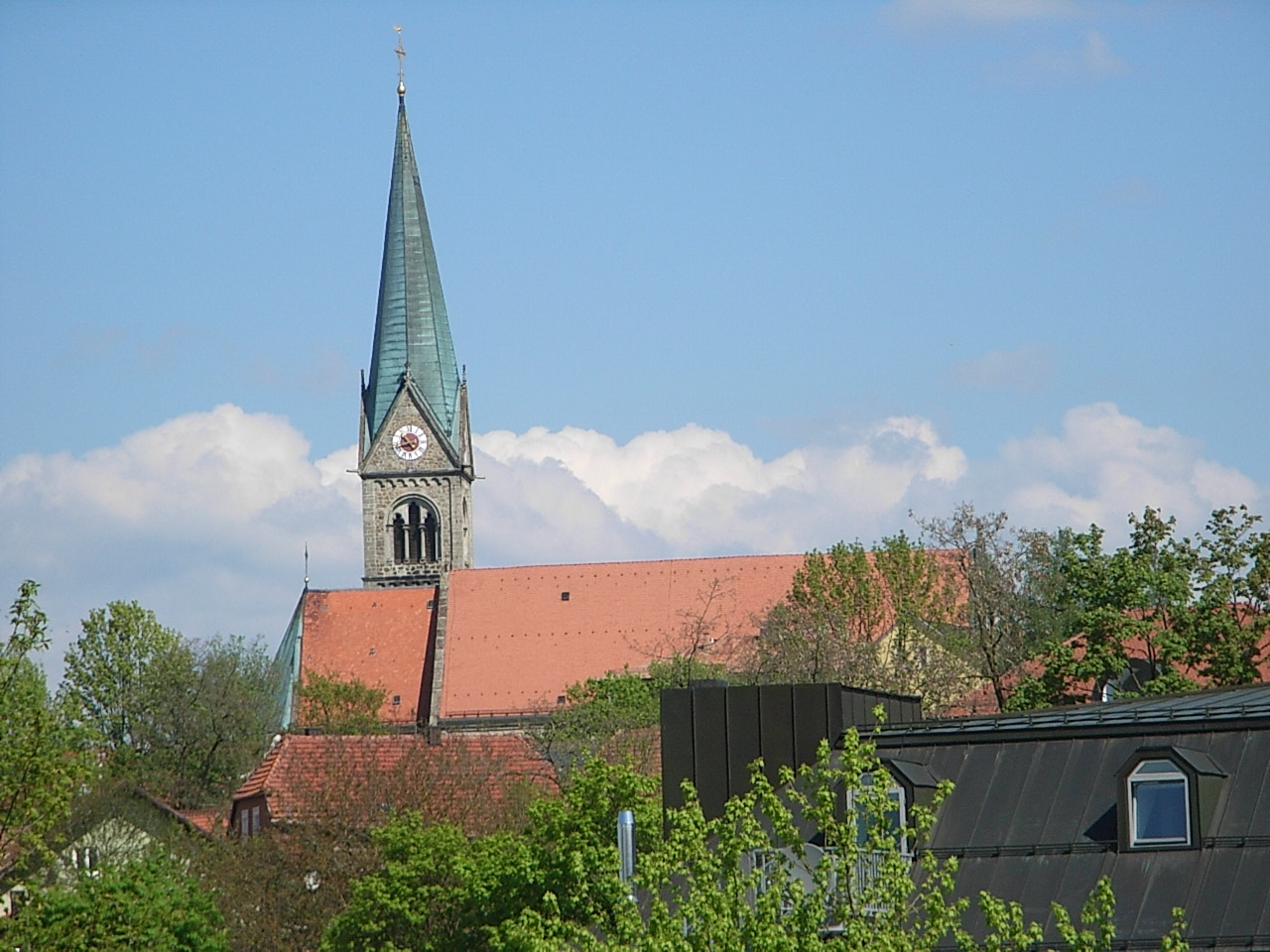
- Saint Vitus Church

- Coat of arms

- Location of Tittling within Passau district
- Interactive map of Tittling
- Location within Germany Location within Bavaria
- Coordinates: 48°43′32.67″N 13°22′54.97″E
- Country: Germany
- State: Bavaria
- Admin. region: Niederbayern
- District: Passau
- Municipal assoc.: Tittling

Government
  - Mayor (2023–29): Josef Artmann (CSU)

Area
  - Total: 20.78 km^{2} (8.02 sq mi)
- Elevation: 540 m (1,770 ft)

Population (2025-12-31)
  - Total: 4,206
  - Density: 202.4/km^{2} (524.2/sq mi)
- Time zone: UTC+01:00 (CET)
  - Summer (DST): UTC+02:00 (CEST)
- Postal codes: 94104
- Dialling codes: 08504
- Vehicle registration: PA
- Website: www.tittling.de

Tittling (German pronunciation: [ˈtɪtlɪŋ]) is a municipality in the district of Passau in Bavaria in Germany.

It is home to the Bavarian Forest Museum Village.

== People ==
- 1964 - Ralf Stadler, politician
