= Beutelsbach =

- Municipality
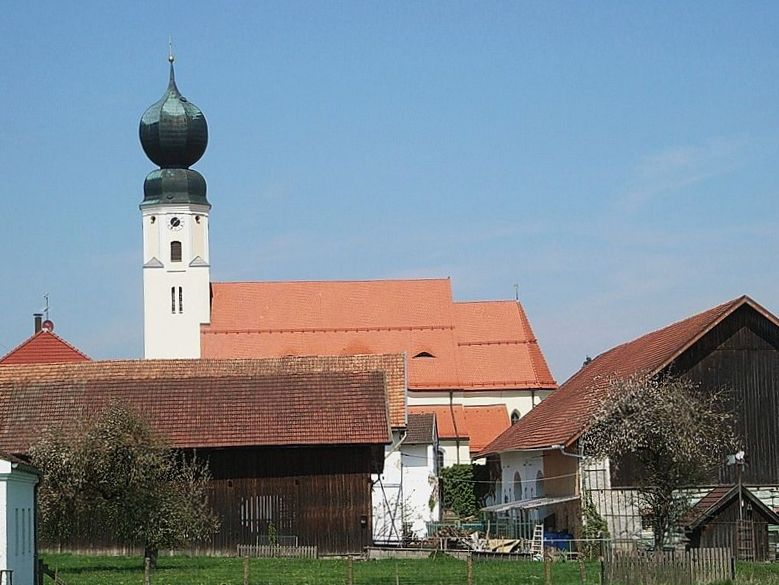
- Church of Saint George

- Coat of arms

- Location of Beutelsbach within Passau district
- Interactive map of Beutelsbach
- Location within Germany Location within Bavaria
- Coordinates: 48°33′N 13°7′E
- Country: Germany
- State: Bavaria
- Admin. region: Niederbayern
- District: Passau
- Municipal assoc.: Aidenbach

Government
  - Mayor (2020–26): Michael Diewald (CSU)

Area
  - Total: 20.39 km^{2} (7.87 sq mi)
- Elevation: 361 m (1,184 ft)

Population (2025-12-31)
  - Total: 1,209
  - Density: 59.29/km^{2} (153.6/sq mi)
- Time zone: UTC+01:00 (CET)
  - Summer (DST): UTC+02:00 (CEST)
- Postal codes: 94501
- Dialling codes: 08543
- Vehicle registration: PA
- Website: www.beutelsbach.de

Beutelsbach (Central Bavarian: Beidlschbo) is a municipality in the district of Passau in Bavaria in Germany.
