= Windorf =

- Municipality
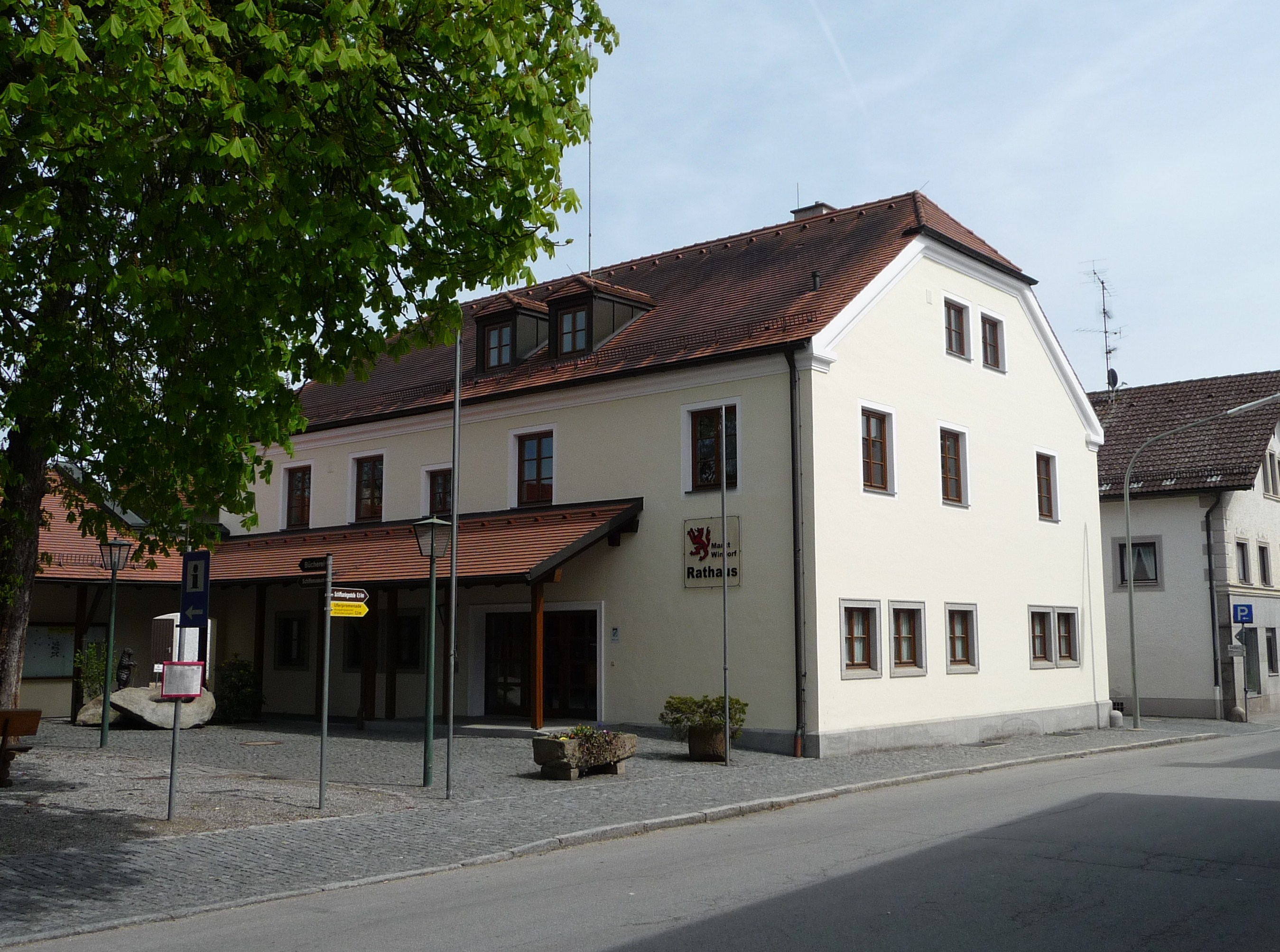
- Town hall

- Coat of arms

- Location of Windorf within Passau district
- Interactive map of Windorf
- Location within Germany Location within Bavaria
- Coordinates: 48°37′30″N 13°13′30″E
- Country: Germany
- State: Bavaria
- Admin. region: Niederbayern
- District: Passau

Government
  - Mayor (2020–26): Franz Langer (CSU)

Area
  - Total: 56.90 km^{2} (21.97 sq mi)
- Elevation: 306–540 m (1,004–1,772 ft)

Population (2025-12-31)
  - Total: 4,981
  - Density: 87.54/km^{2} (226.7/sq mi)
- Time zone: UTC+01:00 (CET)
  - Summer (DST): UTC+02:00 (CEST)
- Postal codes: 94575
- Dialling codes: 08546
- Vehicle registration: PA
- Website: www.markt-windorf.de

Windorf (Central Bavarian: Widoaf) is a municipality in the district of Passau in Bavaria in Germany.
