= Neukirchen vorm Wald =

- Municipality
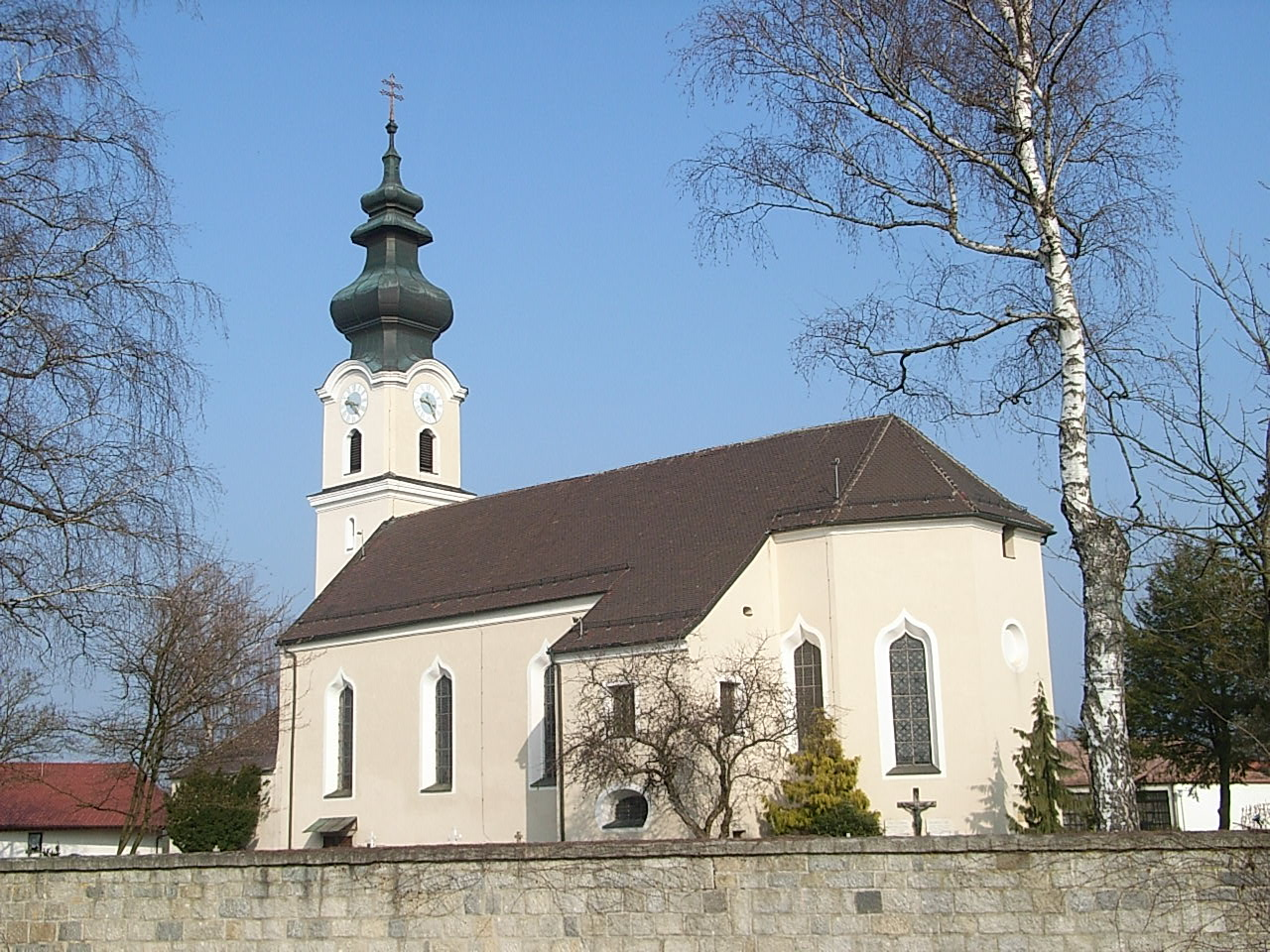
- Saint Martin Church

- Coat of arms

- Location of Neukirchen vorm Wald within Passau district
- Interactive map of Neukirchen vorm Wald
- Location within Germany Location within Bavaria
- Coordinates: 48°41′N 13°23′E
- Country: Germany
- State: Bavaria
- Admin. region: Niederbayern
- District: Passau

Government
  - Mayor (2020–26): Erwin Braumandl (CSU)

Area
  - Total: 24.32 km^{2} (9.39 sq mi)
- Elevation: 466 m (1,529 ft)

Population (2025-12-31)
  - Total: 3,008
  - Density: 123.7/km^{2} (320.3/sq mi)
- Time zone: UTC+01:00 (CET)
  - Summer (DST): UTC+02:00 (CEST)
- Postal codes: 94154
- Dialling codes: 08504
- Vehicle registration: PA
- Website: www.neukirchen-vorm-wald.de

Neukirchen vorm Wald is a municipality in the district of Passau in Bavaria in Germany.
