= Büchlberg =

- Municipality
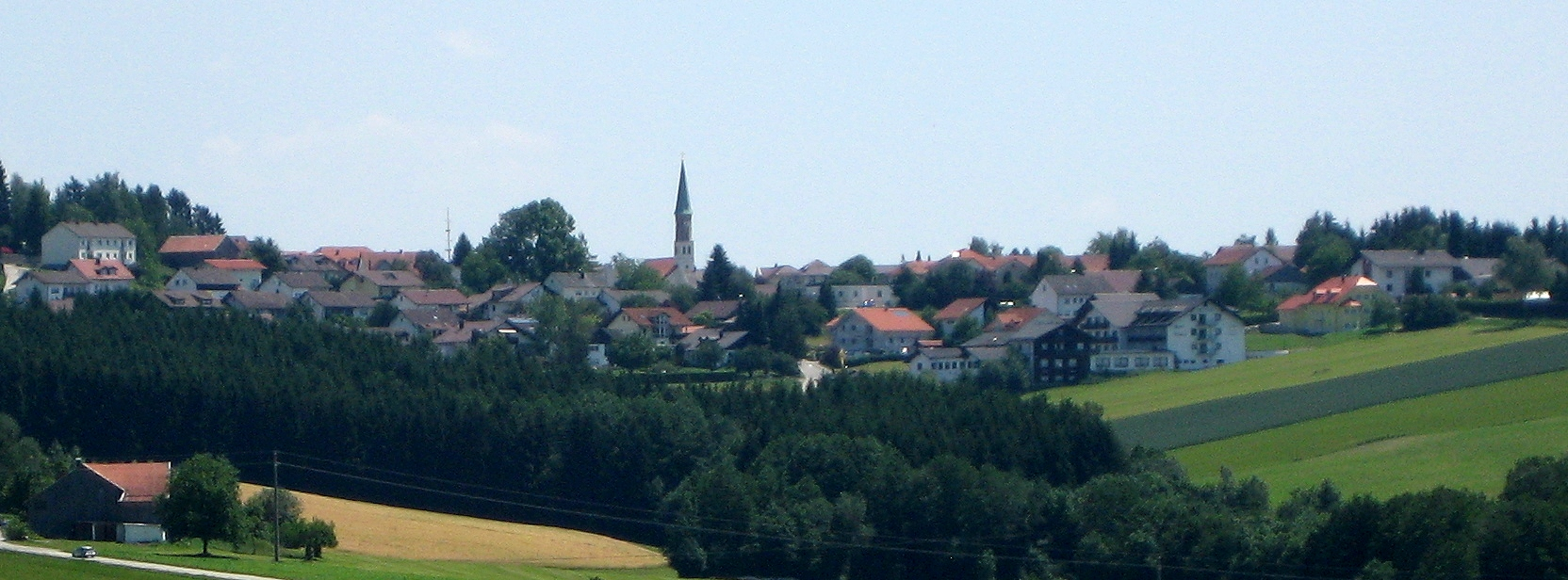
- Büchlberg

- Coat of arms

- Location of Büchlberg within Passau district
- Interactive map of Büchlberg
- Location within Germany Location within Bavaria
- Coordinates: 48°40′N 13°30′E
- Country: Germany
- State: Bavaria
- Admin. region: Niederbayern
- District: Passau

Government
  - Mayor (2020–26): Josef Hasenöhrl (FW)

Area
  - Total: 28.13 km^{2} (10.86 sq mi)
- Elevation: 490 m (1,610 ft)

Population (2025-12-31)
  - Total: 4,388
  - Density: 156.0/km^{2} (404.0/sq mi)
- Time zone: UTC+01:00 (CET)
  - Summer (DST): UTC+02:00 (CEST)
- Postal codes: 94124
- Dialling codes: 08505
- Vehicle registration: PA
- Website: www.buechlberg.de

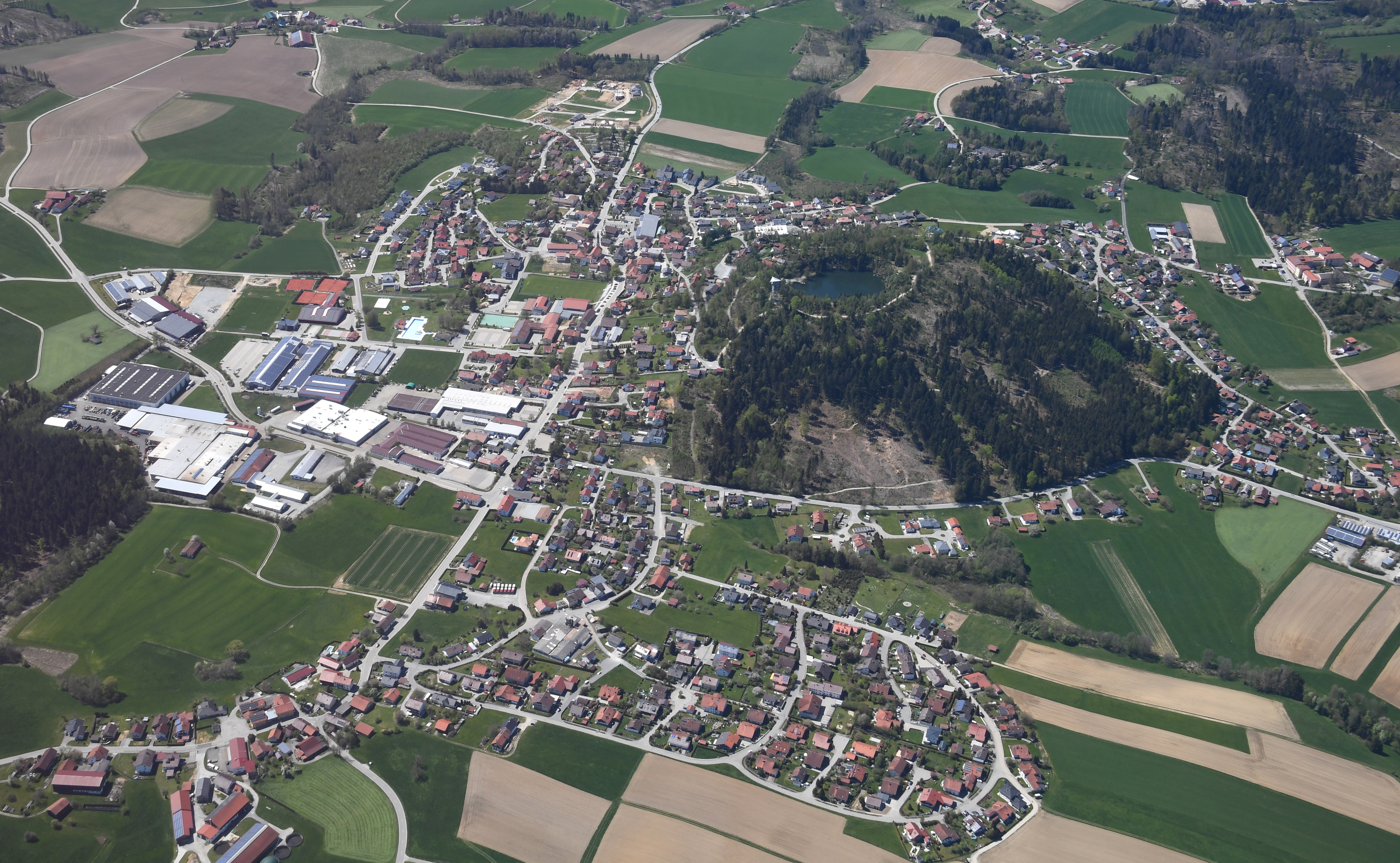
Aerial image of Büchlberg

Büchlberg (Central Bavarian: Bichlbeag) is a municipality in the district of Passau in Bavaria in Germany.
