= Ruderting =

- Municipality
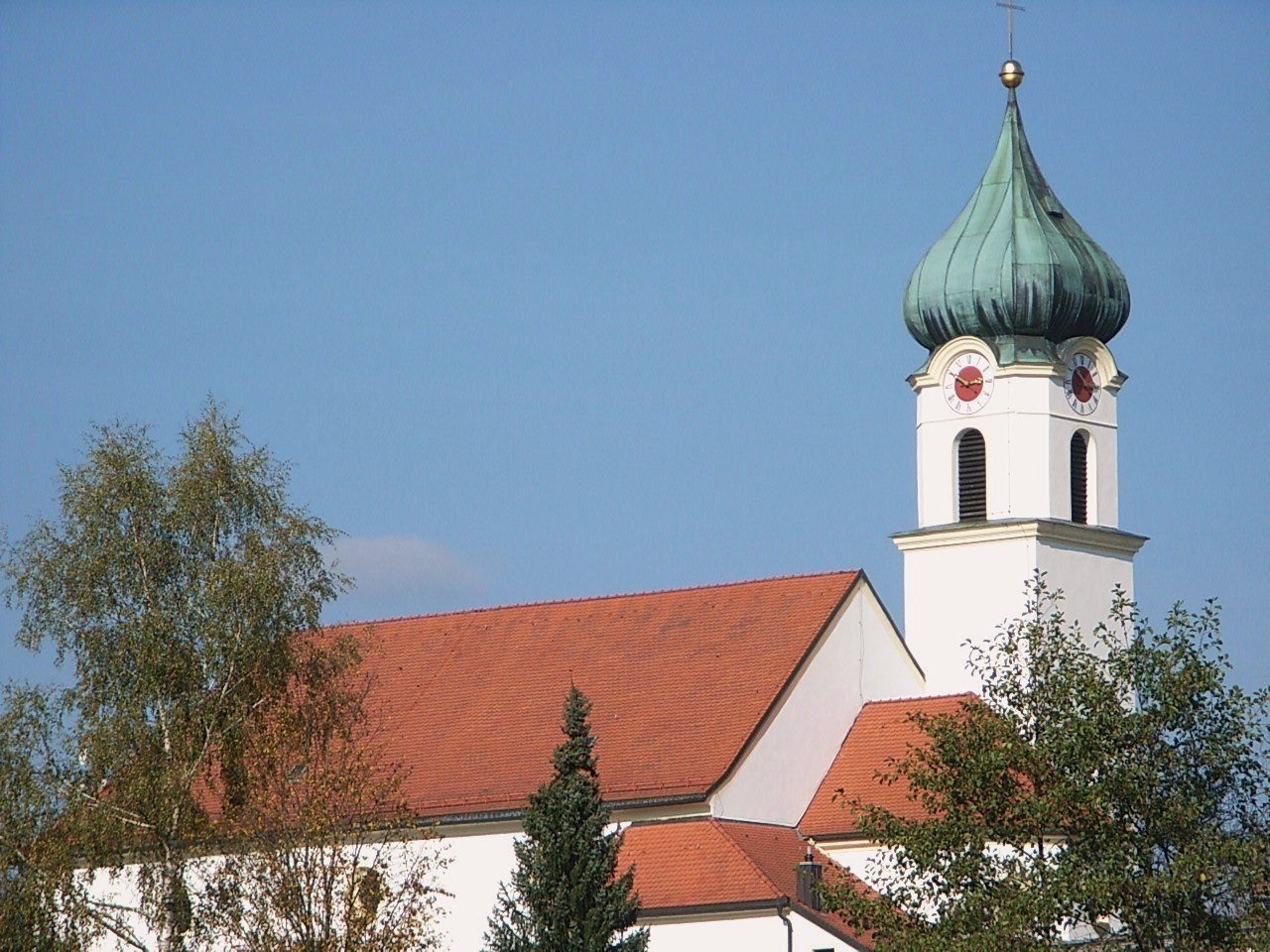
- Church of Saint Joseph

- Coat of arms

- Location of Ruderting within Passau district
- Interactive map of Ruderting
- Location within Germany Location within Bavaria
- Coordinates: 48°39′N 13°25′E
- Country: Germany
- State: Bavaria
- Admin. region: Niederbayern
- District: Passau

Government
  - Mayor (2020–26): Rudolf Müller (CSU)

Area
  - Total: 12.96 km^{2} (5.00 sq mi)
- Elevation: 450 m (1,480 ft)

Population (2025-12-31)
  - Total: 3,040
  - Density: 235/km^{2} (608/sq mi)
- Time zone: UTC+01:00 (CET)
  - Summer (DST): UTC+02:00 (CEST)
- Postal codes: 94161
- Dialling codes: 08509
- Vehicle registration: PA
- Website: www.ruderting.de

Ruderting is a municipality in the district of Passau in Bavaria in south-east Germany.
