= Thyrnau =

- Municipality
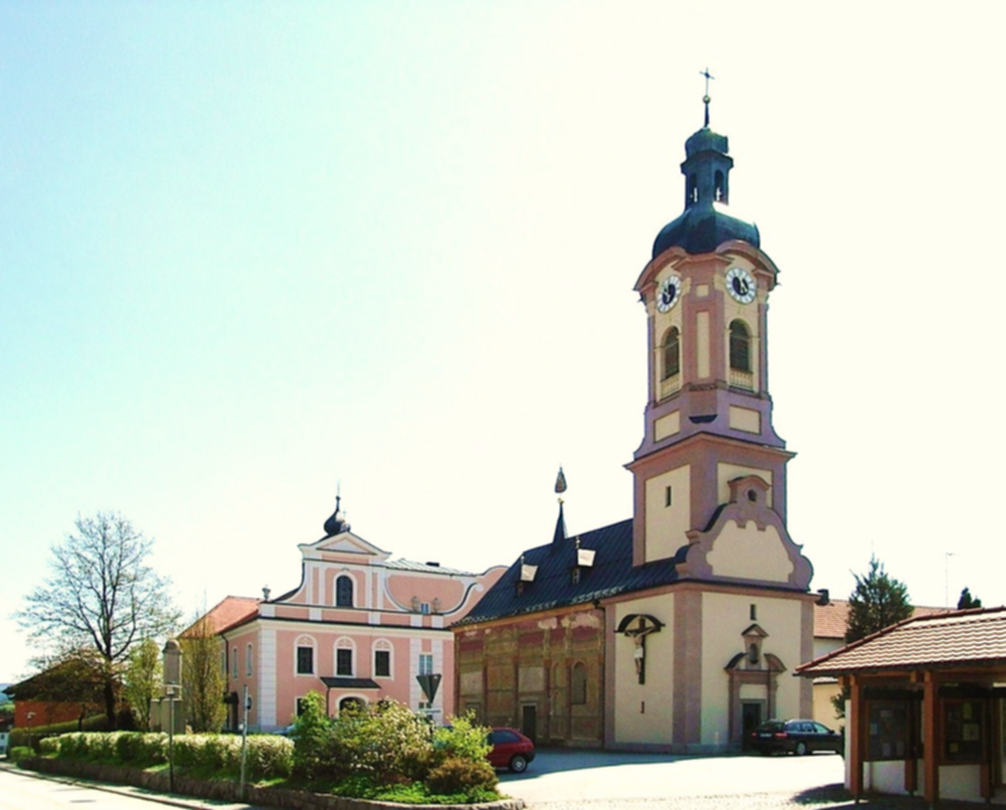
- Parish church (left) and the Loreta Chapel (right)

- Coat of arms

- Location of Thyrnau within Passau district
- Interactive map of Thyrnau
- Location within Germany Location within Bavaria
- Coordinates: 48°37′N 13°32′E
- Country: Germany
- State: Bavaria
- Admin. region: Niederbayern
- District: Passau

Government
  - Mayor (2025–2031): Franz Mautner (CSU)

Area
  - Total: 33.68 km^{2} (13.00 sq mi)
- Elevation: 455 m (1,493 ft)

Population (2025-12-31)
  - Total: 4,112
  - Density: 122.1/km^{2} (316.2/sq mi)
- Time zone: UTC+01:00 (CET)
  - Summer (DST): UTC+02:00 (CEST)
- Postal codes: 94136
- Dialling codes: 08501
- Vehicle registration: PA
- Website: www.thyrnau.de

Thyrnau is a municipality in the district of Passau in Bavaria in Germany.
