= Passau (district) =

Coordinates: 48°30′N 13°20′E

- District
- Flag Coat of arms
- Country: Germany
- State: Bavaria
- Adm. region: Lower Bavaria
- Capital: Passau

Government
  - District admin.: Raimund Kneidinger (CSU)

Area
  - Total: 1,530.28 km^{2} (590.84 sq mi)

Population (31 December 2025)
  - Total: 194,329
  - Density: 126.989/km^{2} (328.900/sq mi)
- Time zone: UTC+01:00 (CET)
  - Summer (DST): UTC+02:00 (CEST)
- Vehicle registration: PA
- Website: www.landkreis-passau.de

Passau is a Landkreis (district) in the southeast of Bavaria, Germany. It encloses the city of Passau geographically from two sides. Neighboring districts are (from the east clockwise) Rottal-Inn, Deggendorf, Freyung-Grafenau. To the south it borders Austria.

== History ==
Archaeological findings prove that the area was settled more than 7,000 years ago.

The city of Passau's name in Roman times was Batava (also known as Batavia). Passau survived three major fires, the biggest one being the all-destructive fire from 1662. After much of the city had burned down, bishops rebuilt it in the Baroque style. Massive cathedrals such as the St. Stephan's Dom (Dom means "cathedral" in German) survive and impress visitors from all over the world. St. Stephan's Dom houses the world's largest church organ outside the United States.

In 1971 the Passau district was created by merging the previous districts, Wegscheid, Vilshofen, Griesbach (Rottal), and parts of the districts of Pfarrkirchen and Eggenfelden.

== Geography ==
The district consists of two geographically different parts, separated by the river Danube. In the north is the southern part of the Bayrischer Wald (Bavarian Forest) mountains with hills up to 1000 meters tall. In the south of the Danube river the landscape is only hilly with plains between the valleys of the Inn and Ilz river.

== Coat of arms ==
The bottom of the coat of arms show the blue-and-white checkered symbol of Bavaria. In the top part is a red wolf and a red panther. The wolf represents the abbey of Passau (Hochstift Passau), which is now the central part of the district. The panther is the symbol of the Wittelsbach family, and it represents the area of the former districts Vilshofen and Griesbach.

== Towns and municipalities ==
Clickable map of towns and municipalities in the district

Towns
Market towns (Märkte)
Municipalities
1. Bad Griesbach (Rottal)
2. Hauzenberg
3. Pocking
4. Vilshofen
1. Eging am See
2. Fürstenzell
3. Hofkirchen
4. Hutthurm
5. Obernzell
6. Ortenburg
7. Untergriesbach
8. Wegscheid
9. Windorf
1. Aicha vorm Wald
2. Aldersbach
3. Bad Füssing
4. Breitenberg
5. Büchlberg
6. Fürstenstein
7. Haarbach
8. Kirchham
9. Kößlarn
10. Neuburg am Inn
11. Neuhaus am Inn
12. Neukirchen vorm Wald
13. Ruderting
14. Ruhstorf an der Rott
15. Salzweg
16. Sonnen
17. Tettenweis
18. Thyrnau
19. Tiefenbach

Verwaltungsgemeinschaften
1. Aidenbach; 1. Aidenbach^{1,2}; 2. Beutelsbach	2. Rotthalmünster; 1. Malching; 2. Rotthalmünster^{1,2}	3. Tittling; 1. Tittling^{1,2}; 2. Witzmannsberg
^{1}seat of the Verwaltungsgemeinschaft; ^{2}Markt
