= Kößlarn =

- Municipality
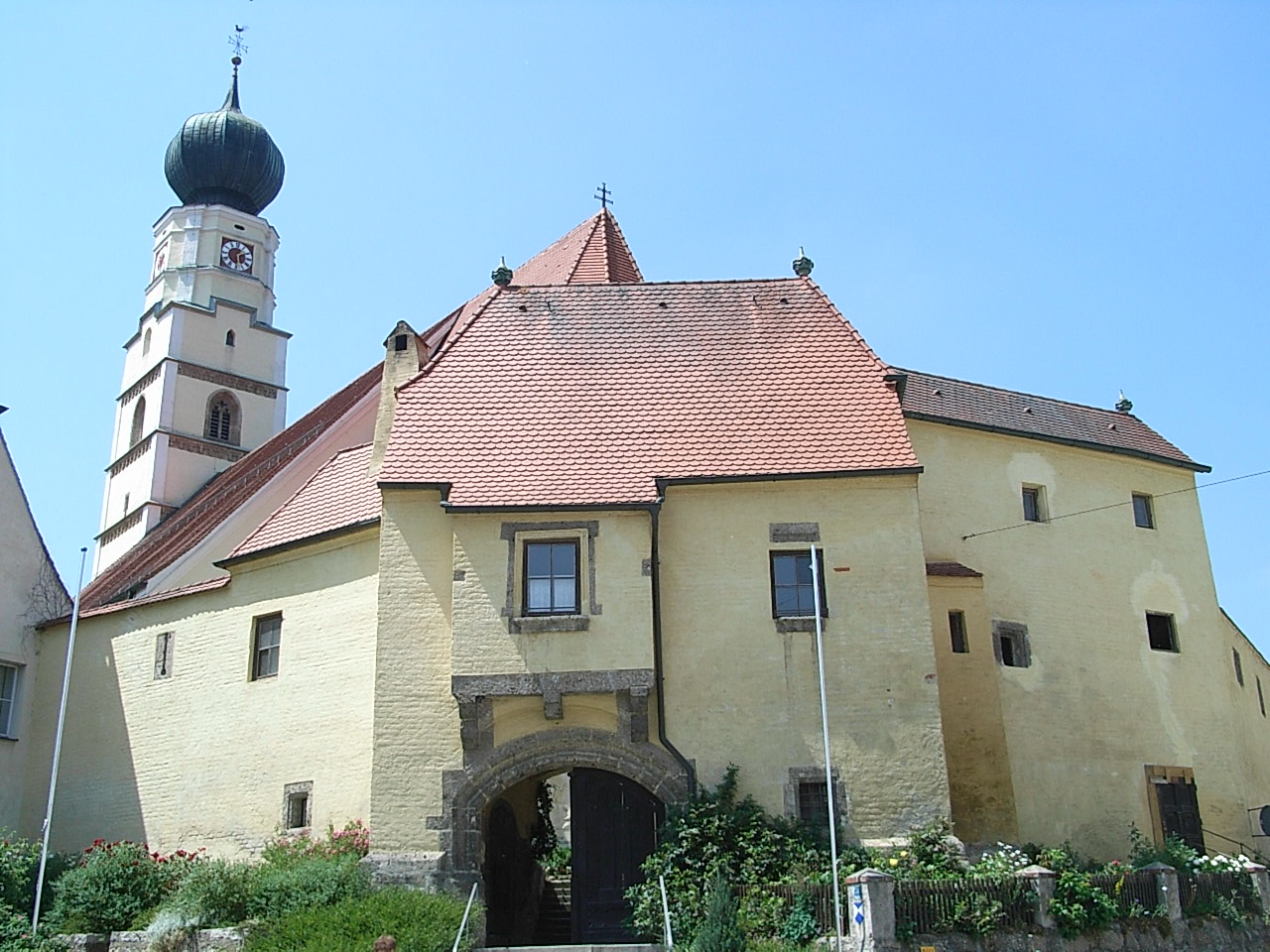
- Wehrkirche Kößlarn (Fortified church)

- Coat of arms

- Location of Kößlarn within Passau district
- Interactive map of Kößlarn
- Location within Germany Location within Bavaria
- Coordinates: 48°22′25″N 13°7′26″E
- Country: Germany
- State: Bavaria
- Admin. region: Niederbayern
- District: Passau
- Subdivisions: 2 Ortsteile

Government
  - Mayor (2020–26): Willibald Lindner

Area
  - Total: 25.48 km^{2} (9.84 sq mi)
- Elevation: 425 m (1,394 ft)

Population (2025-12-31)
  - Total: 1,862
  - Density: 73.08/km^{2} (189.3/sq mi)
- Time zone: UTC+01:00 (CET)
  - Summer (DST): UTC+02:00 (CEST)
- Postal codes: 94149
- Dialling codes: 08536
- Vehicle registration: PA
- Website: www.koesslarn.de

Kößlarn is a municipality in the district of Passau in Bavaria in Germany.
