= Rotthalmünster =

- Municipality
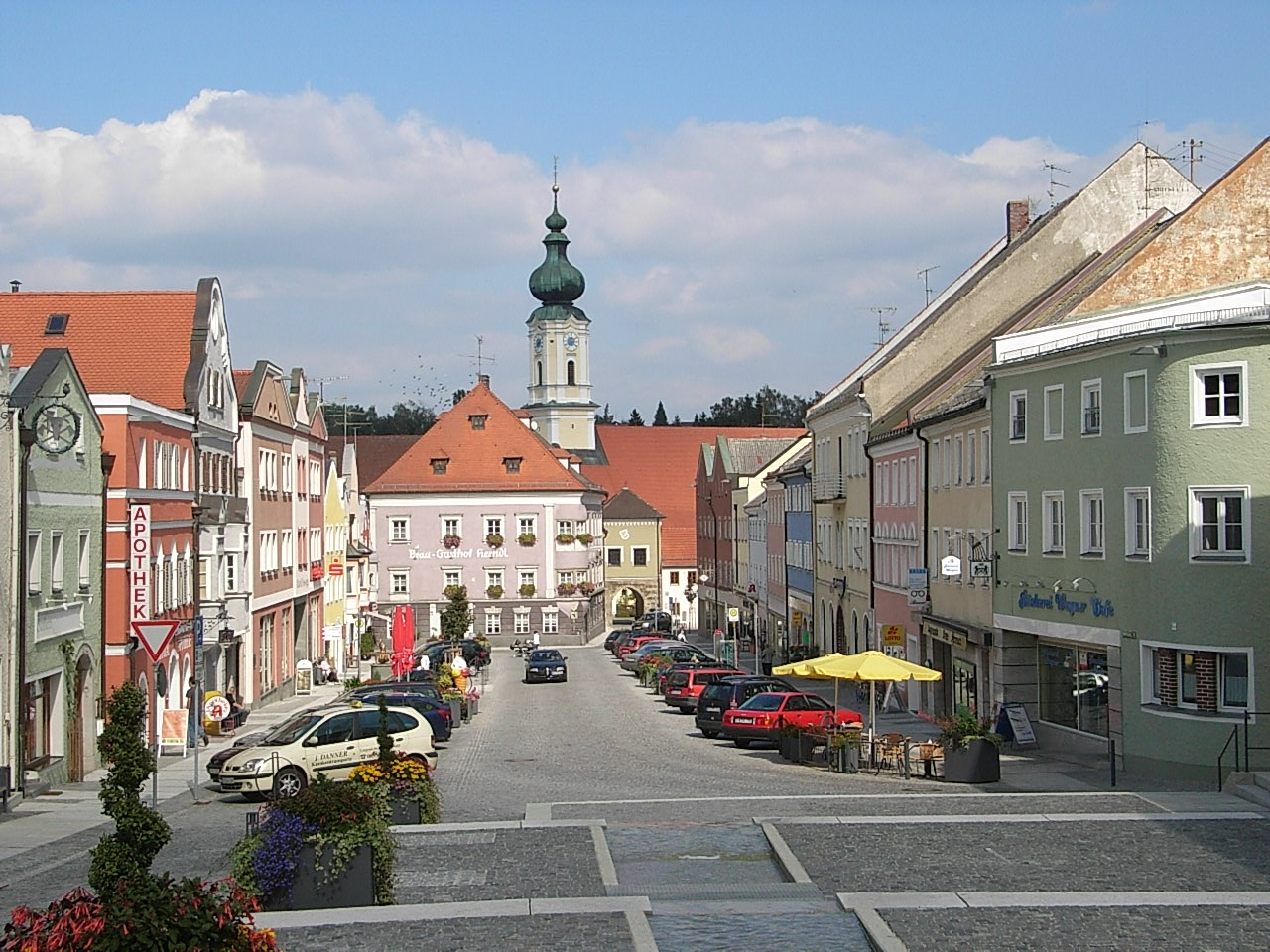
- Market square in Rotthalmünster

- Coat of arms

- Location of Rotthalmünster within Passau district
- Interactive map of Rotthalmünster
- Location within Germany Location within Bavaria
- Coordinates: 48°21′35″N 13°12′10″E
- Country: Germany
- State: Bavaria
- Admin. region: Niederbayern
- District: Passau
- Municipal assoc.: Rotthalmünster

Government
  - Mayor (2020–26): Günter Straußberger

Area
  - Total: 44.55 km^{2} (17.20 sq mi)
- Elevation: 340–485 m (1,115–1,591 ft)

Population (2025-12-31)
  - Total: 4,660
  - Density: 105/km^{2} (271/sq mi)
- Time zone: UTC+01:00 (CET)
  - Summer (DST): UTC+02:00 (CEST)
- Postal codes: 94094
- Dialling codes: 08533
- Vehicle registration: PA
- Website: www.rotthalmuenster.de

Rotthalmünster (German pronunciation: [ʁɔtaːlˈmʏnstɐ]; Central Bavarian: Rotthalmünsta) is a municipality in the district of Passau in Bavaria in Germany.

== Notable people ==
- Konrad Dobler, German athlete
