= Wittibreut =

- Municipality
- Coat of arms

- Location of Wittibreut within Rottal-Inn district
- Interactive map of Wittibreut
- Location within Germany Location within Bavaria
- Coordinates: 48°19′45″N 12°59′14″E
- Country: Germany
- State: Bavaria
- Admin. region: Niederbayern
- District: Rottal-Inn

Government
  - Mayor (2020–26): Christine Moser (CSU)

Area
  - Total: 38.35 km^{2} (14.81 sq mi)
- Elevation: 480 m (1,570 ft)

Population (2025-12-31)
  - Total: 1,943
  - Density: 50.66/km^{2} (131.2/sq mi)
- Time zone: UTC+01:00 (CET)
  - Summer (DST): UTC+02:00 (CEST)
- Postal codes: 84384
- Dialling codes: 08574
- Vehicle registration: PAN
- Website: www.wittibreut.de

Wittibreut is a municipality in the district of Rottal-Inn in Bavaria, Germany.
