= Kirchham =

- Municipality
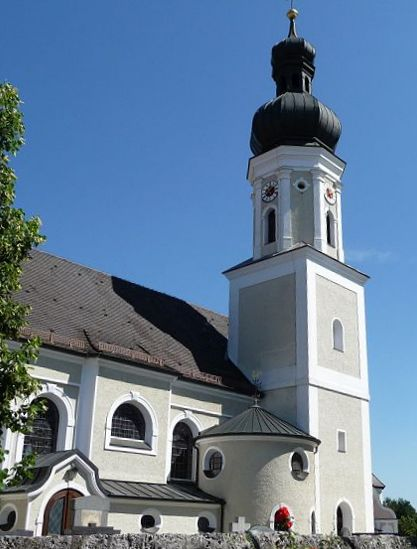
- Saint Martin Church

- Coat of arms

- Location of Kirchham within Passau district
- Interactive map of Kirchham
- Location within Germany Location within Bavaria
- Coordinates: 48°21′N 13°16′E
- Country: Germany
- State: Bavaria
- Admin. region: Niederbayern
- District: Passau

Government
  - Mayor (2020–26): Anton Freudenstein (CSU)

Area
  - Total: 18.47 km^{2} (7.13 sq mi)
- Elevation: 335 m (1,099 ft)

Population (2025-12-31)
  - Total: 2,653
  - Density: 143.6/km^{2} (372.0/sq mi)
- Time zone: UTC+01:00 (CET)
  - Summer (DST): UTC+02:00 (CEST)
- Postal codes: 94148
- Dialling codes: 08531, 08533, 08537
- Vehicle registration: PA
- Website: www.kirchham.de

Kirchham (German pronunciation: [ˈkɪʁçˌham], literally "Churcham") is a municipality in the district of Passau in Bavaria in Germany.

Kirchham has 27 Ortsteile (subdivisions):

- Angloh
- Bach
- Ed
- Eggen
- Erlbach
- Hinterberg
- Hinteröd
- Hof
- Hofgarten
- Hoheneich
- Kirchham
- Moos
- Ort
- Osterholzen
- Reisner
- Reith
- Roidenhub
- Schambach
- Senget
- Stadlöd
- Staubermühle
- Stocking
- Tutting
- Uttelsberg
- Waldstadt
- Weinberg
- Zanklöd

Kirchham is twinned with Churcham, England.
