= Deggendorf (electoral district) =

Federal electoral district of Germany

226 Deggendorf
- Electoral district for the Bundestag
- Deggendorf in 2025
- State: Bavaria
- Population: 211,600 (2019)
- Electorate: 166,186 (2021)
- Major settlements: Deggendorf; Plattling; Osterhofen
- Area: 1,941.0 km^{2}

Current electoral district
- Created: 1949
- Party: CSU
- Member: Thomas Erndl
- Elected: 2017, 2021, 2025

Deggendorf is an electoral constituency (German: Wahlkreis) represented in the Bundestag. It elects one member via first-past-the-post voting. Under the current constituency numbering system, it is designated as constituency 226. It is located in southeastern Bavaria, comprising the districts of Deggendorf and Freyung-Grafenau.

Deggendorf was created for the inaugural 1949 federal election. Since 2017, it has been represented by Thomas Erndl of the Christian Social Union (CSU).

== Geography ==
Deggendorf is located in southeastern Bavaria. As of the 2021 federal election, it comprises the districts of Deggendorf and Freyung-Grafenau as well as the municipalities of Aicha vorm Wald, Eging am See, Fürstenstein, and Hofkirchen from the Passau district.

== History ==
Deggendorf was created in 1949. In the 1949 election, it was Bavaria constituency 13 in the numbering system. In the 1953 through 1961 elections, it was number 208. In the 1965 through 1998 elections, it was number 213. In the 2002 and 2005 elections, it was number 228. In the 2009 through 2021 elections, it was number 227. From the 2025 election, it has been number 226.

Originally, the constituency comprised the independent city of Deggendorf and the districts of Landkreis Deggendorf, Kötzting, Regen, and Viechtach. In the 1965 through 1972 elections, it also contained the district of Grafenau. In the 1976 through 2013 elections, it comprised the districts of Deggendorf and Freyung-Grafenau. It acquired its current borders in the 2017 election.

Election	No.	Name	Borders
1949	13	Deggendorf	Deggendorf city; Landkreis Deggendorf district; Kötzting district; Regen district; Viechtach district
1953	208	Deggendorf	Deggendorf city; Landkreis Deggendorf district; Kötzting district; Regen district; Viechtach district
1957	208	Deggendorf	Deggendorf city; Landkreis Deggendorf district; Kötzting district; Regen district; Viechtach district
1961	208	Deggendorf	Deggendorf city; Landkreis Deggendorf district; Kötzting district; Regen district; Viechtach district
1965	213	Deggendorf	Deggendorf city; Landkreis Deggendorf district; Kötzting district; Regen district; Viechtach district; Grafenau district
1969	213	Deggendorf	Deggendorf city; Landkreis Deggendorf district; Kötzting district; Regen district; Viechtach district; Grafenau district
1972	213	Deggendorf	Deggendorf city; Landkreis Deggendorf district; Kötzting district; Regen district; Viechtach district; Grafenau district
1976	213	Deggendorf	Deggendorf district; Freyung-Grafenau district
1980	213	Deggendorf	Deggendorf district; Freyung-Grafenau district
1983	213	Deggendorf	Deggendorf district; Freyung-Grafenau district
1987	213	Deggendorf	Deggendorf district; Freyung-Grafenau district
1990	213	Deggendorf	Deggendorf district; Freyung-Grafenau district
1994	213	Deggendorf	Deggendorf district; Freyung-Grafenau district
1998	213	Deggendorf	Deggendorf district; Freyung-Grafenau district
2002	228	Deggendorf	Deggendorf district; Freyung-Grafenau district
2005	228	Deggendorf	Deggendorf district; Freyung-Grafenau district
2009	227	Deggendorf	Deggendorf district; Freyung-Grafenau district
2013	227	Deggendorf	Deggendorf district; Freyung-Grafenau district
2017	227	Deggendorf	Deggendorf district; Freyung-Grafenau district; Passau district (only Aicha vorm Wald, Eging am See, Fürstenstein, and Hofkirchen municipalities)
2021	227	Deggendorf	Deggendorf district; Freyung-Grafenau district; Passau district (only Aicha vorm Wald, Eging am See, Fürstenstein, and Hofkirchen municipalities)
2025	226	Deggendorf	Deggendorf district; Freyung-Grafenau district; Passau district (only Aicha vorm Wald, Eging am See, Fürstenstein, and Hofkirchen municipalities)

== Members ==
The constituency has been held by the Christian Social Union (CSU) during all but one Bundestag term since its creation. It was first represented by Ludwig Volkholz of the Bavaria Party (BP) from 1949 to 1953. Stefan Dittrich won it for the CSU in 1953, and served until 1972. He was succeeded by Franz Handlos from 1972 to 1987. Handlos was elected for the CSU in each of his four terms, but left the party in 1983 to co-found The Republicans. After losing the leadership of the party, he founded the Freedom People's Party (FVP) in 1985. He was defeated in 1987 by CSU candidate Bartholomäus Kalb. Kalb was then representative from 1987 to 2017, a total of eight consecutive terms. Thomas Erndl was elected in 2017 and re-elected in 2021 and 2025.

Election	Member	Party	%
1949	Ludwig Volkholz	BP	35.5
1953	Stefan Dittrich	CSU	48.1
1957	Stefan Dittrich	CSU	61.8
1961	Stefan Dittrich	CSU	63.8
1965	Stefan Dittrich	CSU	63.0
1969	Stefan Dittrich	CSU	58.8
1972	Franz Handlos (Note: Handlos was elected for the CSU, but left the party in July 1983 and co-founded The Republicans. He left the party in 1985 to found the Freiheitliche Volkspartei (Freedom People's Party, FVP) in 1985.)	CSU	65.0
1976	Franz Handlos	CSU	73.3
1980	Franz Handlos	CSU	72.0
1983	Franz Handlos	CSU	73.6
1983	Franz Handlos	REP	73.6
1983	Franz Handlos	FVP	73.6
1987	Bartholomäus Kalb	CSU	57.2
1990	Bartholomäus Kalb	CSU	61.6
1994	Bartholomäus Kalb	CSU	61.1
1998	Bartholomäus Kalb	CSU	56.2
2002	Bartholomäus Kalb	CSU	68.9
2005	Bartholomäus Kalb	CSU	61.0
2009	Bartholomäus Kalb	CSU	52.9
2013	Bartholomäus Kalb	CSU	61.4
2017	Thomas Erndl	CSU	44.1
2021	Thomas Erndl	CSU	37.4
2025	Thomas Erndl	CSU	43.3

== Election results ==
=== 2025 election ===
Federal election (2025): Deggendorf
Notes:	Blue background denotes the winner of the electorate vote. Pink background denotes a candidate elected from their party list. Yellow background denotes an electorate win by a list member, or other incumbent. A ✓ or ✗ denotes status of any incumbent, win or lose respectively.						
Party	Candidate	Votes	%	±%	Party votes	%	±%
CSU	✓ Thomas Erndl	58,446	43.3	▲6.0	52,052	38.5	▲5.2
AfD	Petra Katharina Weileder	36,248	26.9	▲13.1	39,532	29.2	▲15.1
SPD	Rita Andrea Hagl-Kehl	12,155	9.0	▼6.4	10,912	8.1	▼7.6
FW	Florian Michael Mies	11,373	8.4	▼7.2	10,574	7.8	▼6.6
Greens	William Sebastian Damm	6,392	5.0	▼1.4	7,802	6.0	▼1.7
FDP	Muhanad Al-Halak	5,187	3.8	▼1.2	4,283	3.2	▼5.3
Left	Vinojan Vijeyaranjan	3,068	2.3	▲0.8	4,179	3.1	▲1.3
BSW					3,963	2.9	
Tierschutzpartei					764	0.6	▼0.3
ÖDP					508	0.4	▼0.2
BP	Marcus Kiefer	1,098	0.8	▼1.3	464	0.3	▼0.9
Volt	Benjamin David de Smidt	821	0.6		399	0.3	▲0.2
dieBasis					294	0.2	▼1.0
die PARTEI					279	0.2	▼0.3
BD					116	0.1	
Humanists					47	0.0	
MLPD					14	0.0	
Informal votes		709			381		
Total valid votes		134,908			135,236		
Turnout		135,617	82.1	▲5.5			
CSU hold	Majority	22,198	16.4	▼5.4			

=== 2021 election ===
Federal election (2021): Deggendorf
Notes:	Blue background denotes the winner of the electorate vote. Pink background denotes a candidate elected from their party list. Yellow background denotes an electorate win by a list member, or other incumbent. A ✓ or ✗ denotes status of any incumbent, win or lose respectively.						
Party	Candidate	Votes	%	±%	Party votes	%	±%
CSU	✓ Thomas Erndl	47,267	37.4	▼6.7	42,154	33.3	▼7.3
FW	Martin Behringer	19,718	15.6	▲10.0	18,206	14.4	▲10.3
SPD	Rita Hagl-Kehl	19,527	15.4	▼2.0	19,873	15.7	▲1.4
AfD	Hans Fellner	17,432	13.8	▼3.5	17,911	14.1	▼5.0
Greens	Matthias Schwinger	6,890	5.4	▲0.9	8,516	6.7	▲2.1
FDP	Muhanad Al-Halak	6,325	5.0	▲1.0	10,778	8.5	▲1.0
BP	Thomas Pfeffer	2,660	2.1	▼0.9	1,516	1.2	▼0.7
Left	Melanie Demmelhuber	1,895	1.5	▼2.7	2,301	1.8	▼3.1
dieBasis	Lothar Wandtner	1,870	1.5		1,599	1.3	
Tierschutzpartei					1,059	0.8	▲0.1
ÖDP	Rolf Sihr	1,144	0.9		750	0.6	▼0.1
PARTEI	Janina Nizik	905	0.7		646	0.5	▲0.2
Pirates	Josef Reichardt	459	0.4		333	0.3	▲0.1
Team Todenhöfer					175	0.1	
V-Partei3	Johann Kiermaier	410	0.3		156	0.1	0.0
Unabhängige					150	0.1	
Volt					100	0.1	
Gesundheitsforschung					90	0.1	0.0
NPD					88	0.1	▼0.3
The III. Path					67	0.1	
Humanists					63	0.0	
Bündnis C					48	0.0	
du.					29	0.0	
LKR					17	0.0	
MLPD					12	0.0	0.0
DKP					7	0.0	0.0
Informal votes		691			549		
Total valid votes		126,502			126,644		
Turnout		127,193	76.5	▲4.9			
CSU hold	Majority	27,549	21.8	▼4.9			

=== 2017 election ===
Federal election (2017): Deggendorf
Notes:	Blue background denotes the winner of the electorate vote. Pink background denotes a candidate elected from their party list. Yellow background denotes an electorate win by a list member, or other incumbent. A ✓ or ✗ denotes status of any incumbent, win or lose respectively.						
Party	Candidate	Votes	%	±%	Party votes	%	±%
CSU	Thomas Erndl	52,167	44.1	▼17.3	48,182	40.6	▼15.6
SPD	Rita Hagl-Kehl	20,612	17.4	▲1.2	16,915	14.2	▼2.5
AfD	Katrin Ebner-Steiner	20,438	17.3	▲14.0	22,765	19.2	▲15.2
FW	Georg Meiski	6,563	5.5	▲0.8	4,785	4.0	▼0.2
Greens	Christian Heilmann	5,342	4.5	0.0	5,528	4.7	▲0.3
Left	Yenni Kellermann	4,955	4.2	▲1.1	5,892	5.0	▲1.6
FDP	Kenneth Kooter	4,707	4.0	▲2.0	8,968	7.6	▲3.7
BP	Thomas Pfeffer	3,607	3.0	▲1.3	2,258	1.9	▲0.2
Tierschutzpartei					927	0.8	▲0.1
ÖDP					824	0.7	▼0.3
NPD					489	0.4	▼1.1
PARTEI					374	0.3	
Pirates					241	0.2	▼1.2
V-Partei³					158	0.1	
DM					118	0.1	
Gesundheitsforschung					106	0.1	
DiB					96	0.1	
BGE					86	0.1	
MLPD					18	0.0	0.0
BüSo					16	0.0	0.0
DKP					8	0.0	
Informal votes		1,064			701		
Total valid votes		118,391			118,754		
Turnout		119,455	71.7	▲11.2			
CSU hold	Majority	31,555	26.7	▼18.8			

=== 2013 election ===
Federal election (2013): Deggendorf
Notes:	Blue background denotes the winner of the electorate vote. Pink background denotes a candidate elected from their party list. Yellow background denotes an electorate win by a list member, or other incumbent. A ✓ or ✗ denotes status of any incumbent, win or lose respectively.						
Party	Candidate	Votes	%	±%	Party votes	%	±%
CSU	✓ Bartholomäus Kalb	57,145	61.4	▲8.5	52,481	56.3	▲9.8
SPD	Rita Hagl-Kehl	14,779	15.9	▼0.5	15,438	16.6	▲2.1
FW	Stefan Kaiser	4,462	4.8		4,007	4.3	
Greens	Antje Laux	4,187	4.5	▼2.7	4,065	4.4	▼2.2
AfD	Rudolf Weiss	3,040	3.3		3,787	4.1	
Left	Rolf Pannicke	2,802	3.0	▼4.3	3,107	3.3	▼4.7
FDP	Sebastian Dietmar	1,950	2.1	▼9.8	3,557	3.8	▼10.5
BP		1,773	1.9		1,559	1.7	▲0.4
NPD	Alfred Steinleitner	1,664	1.8	▼1.5	1,440	1.5	▼0.8
Pirates	Walter Straßer	1,296	1.4		1,280	1.4	▲0.1
ÖDP					935	1.0	▼0.3
Tierschutzpartei					661	0.7	▲0.1
REP					435	0.5	▼1.1
DIE FRAUEN					171	0.2	
DIE VIOLETTEN					87	0.1	▼0.1
Party of Reason					66	0.1	
PRO					66	0.1	
RRP					36	0.0	▼0.5
BüSo					13	0.0	0.0
MLPD					11	0.0	0.0
Informal votes		843			739		
Total valid votes		93,098			93,202		
Turnout		93,941	60.6	▼0.8			
CSU hold	Majority	42,366	45.5	▲9.0			

=== 2009 election ===
Federal election (2009): Deggendorf
Notes:	Blue background denotes the winner of the electorate vote. Pink background denotes a candidate elected from their party list. Yellow background denotes an electorate win by a list member, or other incumbent. A ✓ or ✗ denotes status of any incumbent, win or lose respectively.						
Party	Candidate	Votes	%	±%	Party votes	%	±%
CSU	✓ Bartholomäus Kalb	49,398	52.9	▼8.1	43,628	46.5	▼11.2
SPD	Rita Hagl	15,336	16.4	▼7.4	13,611	14.5	▼6.0
FDP	Gerhard Drexler (Note: Drexler entered the Bundestag on the FDP list after the resignation of Max Stadler in May 2013.)	11,065	11.8	▲6.1	13,485	14.4	▲6.5
Left	Rolf Pannicke	6,851	7.3	▲4.0	7,536	8.0	▲4.3
Greens	Josef Rosner	6,717	7.2	▲4.2	6,189	6.6	▲2.9
NPD	Alfred Steinleitner	3,039	3.3	▲0.2	2,190	2.3	▲0.1
REP					1,449	1.5	▼0.4
BP					1,213	1.3	▲0.4
ÖDP					1,178	1.3	
Pirates					1,160	1.2	
Freie Union	Josef Brunner	992	1.1				
FAMILIE					686	0.7	▲0.1
Tierschutzpartei					537	0.6	
RRP					514	0.5	
DIE VIOLETTEN					187	0.2	
CM					112	0.1	
PBC					110	0.1	▼0.1
DVU					46	0.0	
BüSo					25	0.0	0.0
MLPD					17	0.0	0.0
Informal votes		1,524			1,049		
Total valid votes		93,398			93,873		
Turnout		94,922	61.3	▼9.5			
CSU hold	Majority	34,062	36.5	▼0.7			

=== 2005 election ===
Federal election (2005):Deggendorf
Notes:	Blue background denotes the winner of the electorate vote. Pink background denotes a candidate elected from their party list. Yellow background denotes an electorate win by a list member, or other incumbent. A ✓ or ✗ denotes status of any incumbent, win or lose respectively.						
Party	Candidate	Votes	%	±%	Party votes	%	±%
CSU	✓ Bartholomäus Kalb	65,555	61.0	▼7.9	62,255	57.7	▼13.3
SPD	Brunhilde Irber	25,586	23.8	▼0.2	22,111	20.5	▲1.1
FDP	Gerhard Drexler	6,206	5.8	▲3.8	8,530	7.9	▲4.8
Left	Florian Paul	3,603	3.4		4,045	3.7	▲3.4
NPD	Rudolf Dorn	3,313	3.1		2,370	2.2	▲2.0
Greens	Heike Dülfer	3,204	3.0	▲0.1	4,041	3.7	▲0.3
REP					2,109	2.0	▲0.8
BP					950	0.9	▲0.7
Familie					718	0.7	
Feminist					309	0.3	▲0.2
GRAUEN					253	0.2	▲0.2
PBC					204	0.2	▲0.1
BüSo					43	0.0	0.0
MLPD					34	0.0	
Informal votes		1,729			1,224		
Total valid votes		107,467			107,972		
Turnout		109,196	70.8	▼6.2			
CSU hold	Majority	39,969	37.2				
