= Passau (electoral district) =

Federal electoral district of Germany

228 Passau
- Electoral district for the Bundestag
- Passau in 2025
- State: Bavaria
- Population: 231,700 (2019)
- Electorate: 176,118 (2025)
- Major settlements: Passau; Vilshofen an der Donau; Pocking
- Area: 1,503.6 km^{2}

Current electoral district
- Created: 1949
- Party: CSU
- Member: Johann Georg Koller
- Elected: 2025

Passau is an electoral constituency (German: Wahlkreis) represented in the Bundestag. It elects one member via first-past-the-post voting. Under the current constituency numbering system, it is designated as constituency 228. It is located in southeastern Bavaria, comprising the city of Passau and most of the Landkreis Passau district.

Passau was created for the inaugural 1949 federal election. Since 2025, it has been represented by Johann Georg Koller of the Christian Social Union (CSU).

== Geography ==
Passau is located in southeastern Bavaria. As of the 2021 federal election, it comprises the independent city of Passau and the entirety of the Landkreis Passau district excluding the municipalities of Aicha vorm Wald, Eging am See, Fürstenstein, and Hofkirchen.

== History ==
Passau was created in 1949. In the 1949 election, it was Bavaria constituency 15 in the numbering system. In the 1953 through 1961 elections, it was number 210. In the 1965 through 1998 elections, it was number 215. In the 2002 and 2005 elections, it was number 230. In the 2009 through 2021 elections, it was number 229. From the 2025 election, it has been number 228.

Originally, the constituency comprised the independent city of Passau and the districts of Landkreis Passau, Wegscheid, and Wolfstein. In the 1976 through 1972 elections, it also contained the Vilshofen district. In the 1976 through 2013 elections, it comprised the city of Passau and the Landkreis Passau district. It acquired its current borders in the 2017 election.

Election	No.	Name	Borders
1949	15	Passau	Passau city; Landkreis Passau district; Wegscheid district; Wolfstein district
1953	210	Passau	Passau city; Landkreis Passau district; Wegscheid district; Wolfstein district
1957	210	Passau	Passau city; Landkreis Passau district; Wegscheid district; Wolfstein district
1961	210	Passau	Passau city; Landkreis Passau district; Wegscheid district; Wolfstein district
1965	215	Passau	Passau city; Landkreis Passau district; Wegscheid district; Wolfstein district; Vilshofen district
1969	215	Passau	Passau city; Landkreis Passau district; Wegscheid district; Wolfstein district; Vilshofen district
1972	215	Passau	Passau city; Landkreis Passau district; Wegscheid district; Wolfstein district; Vilshofen district
1976	215	Passau	Passau city; Landkreis Passau district
1980	215	Passau	Passau city; Landkreis Passau district
1983	215	Passau	Passau city; Landkreis Passau district
1987	215	Passau	Passau city; Landkreis Passau district
1990	215	Passau	Passau city; Landkreis Passau district
1994	215	Passau	Passau city; Landkreis Passau district
1998	215	Passau	Passau city; Landkreis Passau district
2002	230	Passau	Passau city; Landkreis Passau district
2005	230	Passau	Passau city; Landkreis Passau district
2009	229	Passau	Passau city; Landkreis Passau district
2013	229	Passau	Passau city; Landkreis Passau district
2017	229	Passau	Passau city; Landkreis Passau district (excluding Aicha vorm Wald, Eging am See, Fürstenstein, and Hofkirchen municipalities)
2021	229	Passau	Passau city; Landkreis Passau district (excluding Aicha vorm Wald, Eging am See, Fürstenstein, and Hofkirchen municipalities)
2025	228	Passau	Passau city; Landkreis Passau district (excluding Aicha vorm Wald, Eging am See, Fürstenstein, and Hofkirchen municipalities)

== Members ==
The constituency has been held continuously by the Christian Social Union (CSU) since its creation. It was first represented by Fritz Schäffer from 1949 to 1961, followed by August Ramminger for one term. Franz Xaver Unertl served two terms from 1965 to 1972, as did Karl Fuchs from 1972 to 1980. Klaus Rose was then representative from 1980 to 2005, a total of seven consecutive terms. Andreas Scheuer was elected in 2005, and re-elected in 2009, 2013, 2017, and 2021. In 2025, Johann Georg Koller retained the seat for the CSU..

Election	Member	Party	%
1949	Fritz Schäffer	CSU	33.0
1953	Fritz Schäffer	CSU	61.8
1957	Fritz Schäffer	CSU	70.4
1961	August Ramminger	CSU	68.3
1965	Franz Xaver Unertl	CSU	63.7
1969	Franz Xaver Unertl	CSU	66.1
1972	Karl Fuchs	CSU	66.4
1976	Karl Fuchs	CSU	66.9
1980	Klaus Rose	CSU	65.4
1983	Klaus Rose	CSU	68.9
1987	Klaus Rose	CSU	62.3
1990	Klaus Rose	CSU	56.7
1994	Klaus Rose	CSU	59.1
1998	Klaus Rose	CSU	52.8
2002	Klaus Rose	CSU	64.8
2005	Andreas Scheuer	CSU	58.5
2009	Andreas Scheuer	CSU	46.5
2013	Andreas Scheuer	CSU	59.8
2017	Andreas Scheuer	CSU	47.5
2021	Andreas Scheuer	CSU	30.7
2025	Johann Georg Koller	CSU	40.8

== Election results ==
=== 2025 election ===
Federal election (2025): Passau
Notes:	Blue background denotes the winner of the electorate vote. Pink background denotes a candidate elected from their party list. Yellow background denotes an electorate win by a list member, or other incumbent. A ✓ or ✗ denotes status of any incumbent, win or lose respectively.						
Party	Candidate	Votes	%	±%	Party votes	%	±%
CSU	Johann Georg Koller	58,538	40.8	▲10.1	55,447	38.6	▲6.1
AfD	Erhard Josef Brucker	33,776	23.5	▲11.6	36,665	25.5	▲13.7
SPD	Johannes Schätzl	20,120	14.0	▼6.9	13,904	9.7	▼7.9
FW	Rupert Thomas Kreuzhuber	9,199	6.4	▼6.3	9,154	6.4	▼5.7
Greens	Frederic-Alexej Müller	7,425	5.2	▼3.8	9,821	6.8	▼2.5
Left	Luke Rolf Hoß	4,172	2.9	▲0.9	5,692	4.0	▲1.7
BSW	Simone Ketterl	3,804	2.7		4,895	3.4	
FDP	Jan Christoph Alfred Ernst	3,072	2.1	▼5.6	4,706	3.3	▼6.1
ÖDP	Johanna Maria Seitz	2,625	1.8	▼1.0	1,016	0.7	▼0.3
APT					873	0.6	▼0.3
Volt	Simon Josef Böldl	799	0.6		488	0.3	▲0.2
PARTEI					355	0.2	▼0.2
dieBasis					300	0.2	▼0.9
BP					241	0.2	▼0.4
BD					85	0.1	
Humanists					71	0.0	Steady
MLPD					8	0.0	Steady
Informal votes		597			406		
Total valid votes		143,530			143,721		
Turnout		144,127	81.8	▲4.9			
CSU hold	Majority	24,762	17.3	▲7.5			

=== 2021 election ===
Federal election (2021): Passau
Notes:	Blue background denotes the winner of the electorate vote. Pink background denotes a candidate elected from their party list. Yellow background denotes an electorate win by a list member, or other incumbent. A ✓ or ✗ denotes status of any incumbent, win or lose respectively.						
Party	Candidate	Votes	%	±%	Party votes	%	±%
CSU	✓ Andreas Scheuer	41,530	30.7	▼16.8	44,215	32.5	▼8.0
SPD	Johannes Schätzl	28,341	20.9	▲2.0	23,892	17.6	▲2.5
FW	Roswitha Toso	17,180	12.7		16,475	12.1	▲9.7
AfD	Ralf Stadler	16,215	12.0	▼2.1	16,023	11.8	▼4.3
Greens	Stefanie Auer	12,098	8.9	▲3.4	12,645	9.3	▲2.9
FDP	Martin Probst	10,513	7.8	▲1.7	12,782	9.4	▲0.3
ÖDP	Johanna Seitz	3,876	2.9	▼0.2	1,326	1.0	▼0.3
Left	Josef Ilsanker	2,681	2.0	▼2.8	3,093	2.3	▼3.4
dieBasis	Leo Frankl	1,567	1.2		1,485	1.1	
Tierschutzpartei					1,233	0.9	▲0.1
BP					750	0.6	▼0.4
PARTEI	Christian Boiger	1,235	0.9		673	0.5	0.0
Pirates					351	0.3	0.0
Unabhängige					148	0.1	
Volt					138	0.1	
Team Todenhöfer					136	0.1	
Humanists	Michael Ziegelmeir	244	0.2		134	0.1	
Gesundheitsforschung					131	0.1	0.0
NPD					116	0.1	▼0.2
V-Partei3					83	0.1	▼0.1
Bündnis C					76	0.1	
du.					53	0.0	
The III. Path					50	0.0	
LKR					18	0.0	
DKP					16	0.0	0.0
MLPD					10	0.0	0.0
Informal votes		1,145			573		
Total valid votes		135,480			136,052		
Turnout		136,625	76.9	▲2.9			
CSU hold	Majority	13,189	9.8	▼18.8			

=== 2017 election ===
Federal election (2017): Passau
Notes:	Blue background denotes the winner of the electorate vote. Pink background denotes a candidate elected from their party list. Yellow background denotes an electorate win by a list member, or other incumbent. A ✓ or ✗ denotes status of any incumbent, win or lose respectively.						
Party	Candidate	Votes	%	±%	Party votes	%	±%
CSU	✓ Andreas Scheuer	61,835	47.5	▼12.2	52,937	40.5	▼13.4
SPD	Christian Flisek	24,611	18.9	▼0.7	19,709	15.1	▼3.4
AfD	Robert Schregle	18,328	14.1	▲10.9	20,967	16.1	▲12.1
FDP	Armin Sedlmayr	7,900	6.1		11,918	9.1	▲4.6
Greens	Boris Burkert	7,248	5.6	▲0.4	8,393	6.4	▲0.4
Left	Josef Ilsanker	6,246	4.8	▲1.6	7,357	5.6	▲1.9
FW					3,146	2.4	▼0.5
ÖDP	Andreas Seitz	4,003	3.1	▲0.4	1,698	1.3	▼0.4
BP					1,270	1.0	0.0
Tierschutzpartei					1,054	0.8	▲0.1
PARTEI					587	0.4	
NPD					394	0.3	▼0.6
Pirates					318	0.2	▼1.3
V-Partei³					185	0.1	
Gesundheitsforschung					170	0.1	
DM					151	0.1	
BGE					143	0.1	
DiB					131	0.1	
BüSo					15	0.0	0.0
MLPD					15	0.0	0.0
DKP					13	0.0	
Informal votes		1,179			779		
Total valid votes		130,171			130,571		
Turnout		131,350	74.0	▲10.8			
CSU hold	Majority	37,224	28.6	▼11.5			

=== 2013 election ===
Federal election (2013): Passau
Notes:	Blue background denotes the winner of the electorate vote. Pink background denotes a candidate elected from their party list. Yellow background denotes an electorate win by a list member, or other incumbent. A ✓ or ✗ denotes status of any incumbent, win or lose respectively.						
Party	Candidate	Votes	%	±%	Party votes	%	±%
CSU	✓ Andreas Scheuer	69,428	59.8	▲13.3	62,765	53.9	▲9.1
SPD	Christian Flisek	22,845	19.7	▲5.5	21,611	18.6	▲3.4
Greens	Maria Anneser	5,956	5.1	▼2.4	6,895	5.9	▼1.8
FDP					5,198	4.5	▼11.1
FW	Just Thalmeier	4,000	3.4		3,365	2.9	
Left	Josef Ilsanker	3,763	3.2	▼4.7	4,399	3.8	▼4.1
AfD	Robert Adolf Schregle	3,616	3.1		4,518	3.9	
ÖDP		3,049	2.6	▼0.1	1,892	1.6	▼0.4
Pirates	Christian Reidel	2,191	1.9		1,811	1.6	▲0.2
BP					1,120	1.0	▲0.2
NPD	Adolf Weber	1,263	1.1	▼1.1	1,104	0.9	▼0.8
Tierschutzpartei					864	0.7	▲0.1
REP					349	0.3	▼0.4
DIE FRAUEN					190	0.2	
DIE VIOLETTEN					122	0.1	▼0.1
Party of Reason					103	0.1	
PRO					81	0.1	
RRP					23	0.0	▼0.4
BüSo					19	0.0	0.0
MLPD					13	0.0	0.0
Informal votes		1,280			949		
Total valid votes		116,111			116,442		
Turnout		117,391	63.0	▼0.6			
CSU hold	Majority	46,583	40.1	▲12.5			

=== 2009 election ===
Federal election (2009): Passau
Notes:	Blue background denotes the winner of the electorate vote. Pink background denotes a candidate elected from their party list. Yellow background denotes an electorate win by a list member, or other incumbent. A ✓ or ✗ denotes status of any incumbent, win or lose respectively.						
Party	Candidate	Votes	%	±%	Party votes	%	±%
CSU	✓ Andreas Scheuer	54,275	46.5	▼12.0	52,476	44.8	▼10.1
FDP	Max Stadler	22,069	18.9	▲9.0	18,202	15.5	▲6.3
SPD	Jella Teuchner	16,573	14.2	▼7.1	17,773	15.2	▼7.7
Left	Joseph Wandl	9,217	7.9	▲4.7	9,198	7.9	▲4.4
Greens	Boris Burkert	8,767	7.5	▲2.6	9,054	7.7	▲2.8
ÖDP	Andreas Seitz	3,212	2.8		2,392	2.0	
NPD	Martin Gabling	2,600	2.2	▲0.1	2,077	1.8	▲0.2
Pirates					1,618	1.4	
BP					912	0.8	▲0.1
REP					792	0.8	▼0.3
FAMILIE					789	0.7	▲0.1
Tierschutzpartei					723	0.6	
RRP					547	0.5	
DIE VIOLETTEN					226	0.2	
CM					116	0.1	
PBC					100	0.1	▼0.1
DVU					72	0.1	
BüSo					40	0.0	0.0
MLPD					18	0.0	0.0
Informal votes		1,536			1,124		
Total valid votes		116,713			117,125		
Turnout		118,249	63.6	▼8.1			
CSU hold	Majority	32,206	27.6	▼9.6			

=== 2005 election ===
Federal election (2005):Passau
Notes:	Blue background denotes the winner of the electorate vote. Pink background denotes a candidate elected from their party list. Yellow background denotes an electorate win by a list member, or other incumbent. A ✓ or ✗ denotes status of any incumbent, win or lose respectively.						
Party	Candidate	Votes	%	±%	Party votes	%	±%
CSU	Andreas Scheuer	76,236	58.5	▼6.3	71,879	54.9	▼12.6
SPD	Jella Teuchner	27,765	21.3	▲1.1	29,997	22.9	▲1.2
FDP	Max Stadler	12,927	9.9	▲1.6	12,095	9.2	▲5.4
Greens	Boris Burkert	6,429	4.9	▲1.1	6,516	4.97	▲0.8
Left	Hans Langmaier	4,142	3.2	▲2.5	4,571	3.5	▲3.1
NPD	Karl-Heinz Ziener	2,801	2.1		2,015	1.5	▲1.3
REP					1,256	1.0	▲0.4
BP					921	0.7	▲0.6
Familie					781	0.6	
GRAUEN					381	0.2	▲0.2
Feminist					285	0.2	▲0.1
PBC					182	0.1	▲0.1
BüSo					82	0.1	▲0.1
MLPD					37	0.0	
Informal votes		2,120			1,422		
Total valid votes		130,300			130,998		
Turnout		132,420	71.7	▼5.9			
CSU hold	Majority	48,471	37.2				
