= Thomas Erndl =

German politician (born 1974)

Thomas Erndl MdB
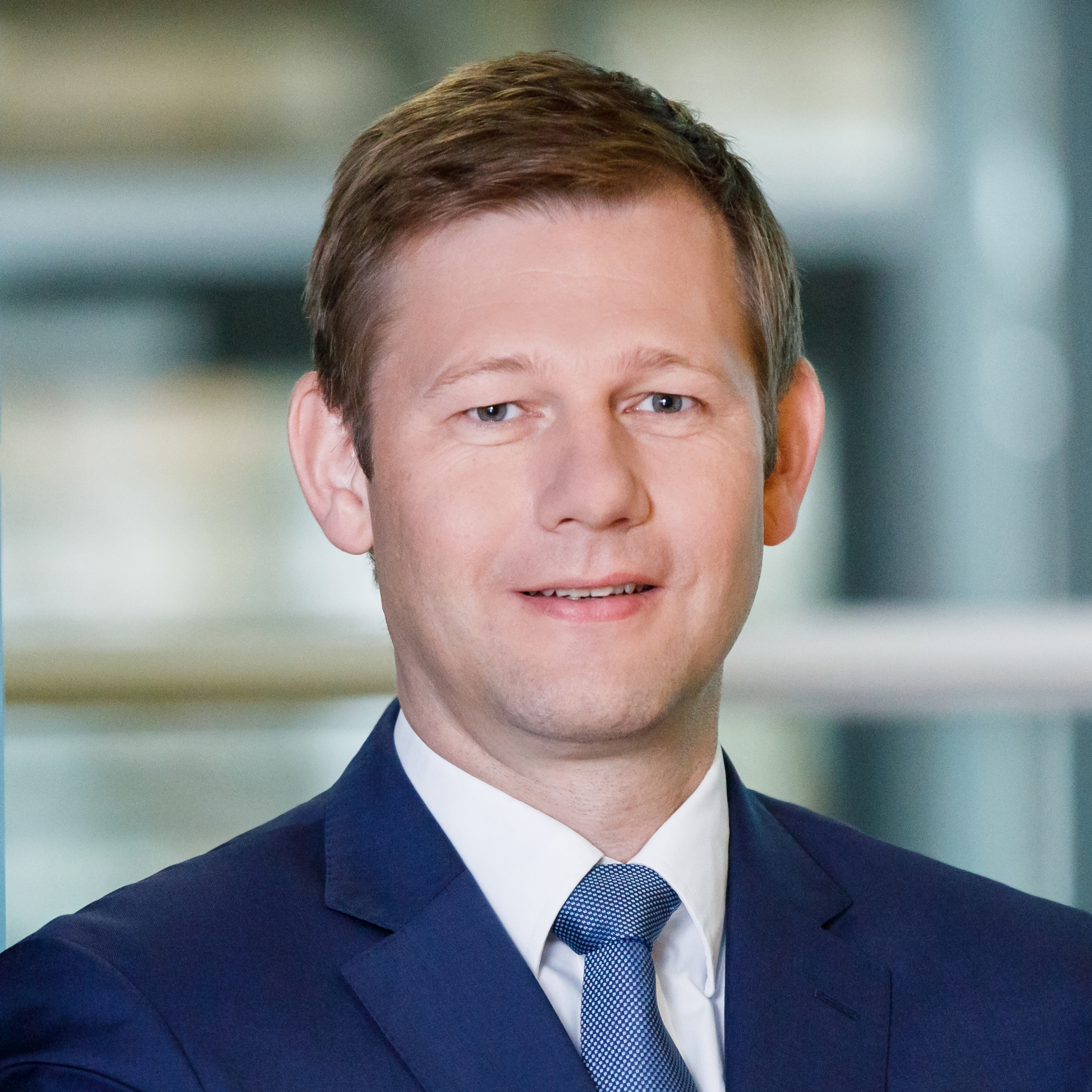
- Thomas Erndl in 2018

Member of the Bundestag; for Deggendorf
- Incumbent
- Assumed office 24 October 2017
- Preceded by: Bartholomäus Kalb

Personal details
- Born: 22 July 1974 (age 52) Osterhofen, West Germany
- Party: Christian Social Union
- Children: 3
- Education: Regensburg University of Applied Sciences

Thomas Erndl (born 22 July 1974) is a German electrical engineer and politician of the Christian Social Union (CSU) who has been serving as a member of the Bundestag since 2017, representing the Deggendorf district.

In parliament, Erndl is the Deputy Chairman of the Foreign Affairs Committee and a member of the Defense Committee. He also serves as his parliamentary group's spokesperson on defense policy.

== Early life and career ==
Erndl was born in Osterhofen, Bavaria. In 1996, he completed his military service with the Implementation Force (IFOR) in Bosnia and Herzegovina. After completing his studies at Regensburg University of Applied Sciences, he worked at NXP Semiconductors.

== Political career ==
Erndl is a member of the CSU since 1991 and engaged in local politics since 1993. In the 2017 German federal election, he stood successfully for election to the Bundestag, representing the Deggendorf electoral district (Wahlkreis 227) in Lower Bavaria. He won 41.1% of the first preference votes.

In parliament, Erndl has been a member in the Committee on Foreign Affairs (since 2018) and the Subcommittee on International Climate and Energy Policy (since 2022). From 2018 to 2021, he chaired the Subcommittee on Foreign Cultural and Educational Policy.

In addition to his work in parliament, Erndl serves as deputy president of the Reservist Association of Deutsche Bundeswehr.

In the negotiations to form a Grand Coalition under the leadership of Friedrich Merz's Christian Democrats (CDU together with the Bavarian CSU) and the Social Democratic Party (SPD) following the 2025 German elections, Erndl was part of the CDU/CSU delegation in the working group on foreign affairs, defense, development cooperation and human rights, led by Johann Wadephul, Florian Hahn and Svenja Schulze.

== Other activities ==
- Federal Academy for Security Policy (BAKS), Member of the Advisory Board (since 2026)
