= Bartholomäus Kalb =

German politician (born 1949)

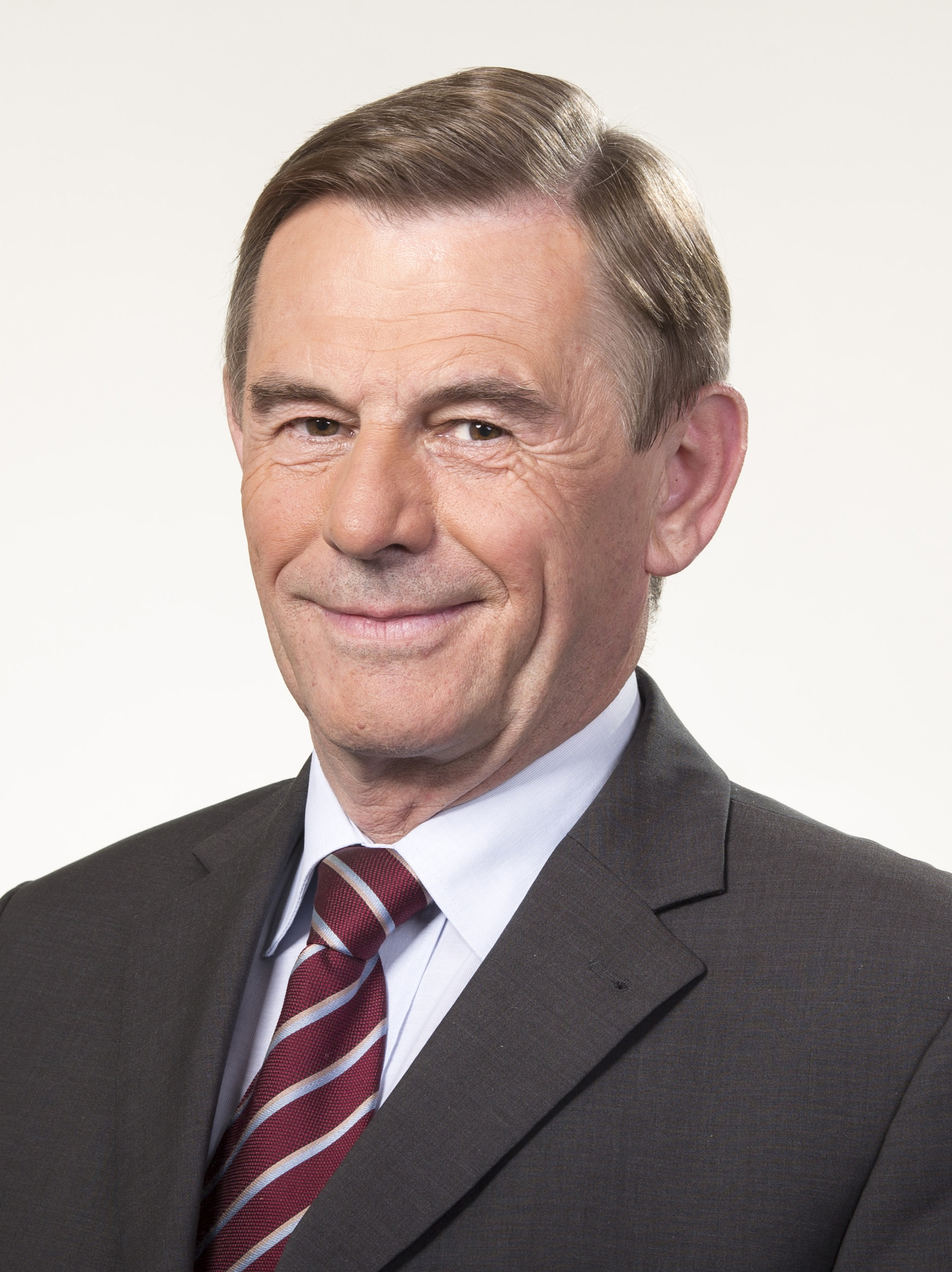
- Kalb in 2012

Member of the Bundestag; for Deggendorf
- In office 18 February 1987 – 24 October 2017
- Preceded by: Franz Handlos
- Succeeded by: Thomas Erndl

Personal details
- Born: 13 July 1949 (age 77) Mamming, West Germany
- Party: Christian Social Union
- Children: 2

Bartholomäus Kalb (born 13 July 1949) is a German politician of the Christian Social Union in Bavaria (CSU).

== Political career ==
In 1972, Kalb was elected to the municipal council of Künzing.

From 1978 to 2002 he held the office of second mayor of the municipality. From 1978 to 1986, he was a member of the Landtag of Bavaria.

From 1987 until 2017, Kalb served as a member of the Bundestag, elected directly from the Deggendorf constituency. He was a member of the Committee on Budgets of the Bundestag, a member of the Audit Committee (a subcommittee of the Committee on Budgets), a deputy member of the Finance Committee, as well as a member of the Federal Funding body.

In the negotiations to form a coalition government of the Christian Democrats (CDU together with the Bavarian CSU) and the Free Democratic Party (FDP) in 2009, Kalb was part of the CDU/CSU delegation in the working group on taxes and finances, led by Thomas de Maizière and Hermann Otto Solms. Later, in the negotiations to form a Grand Coalition of the Christian Democrats and the Social Democrats (SPD) following the 2013 federal elections, he was again part of the CDU/CSU delegation in the working group on financial policy and the national budget, this time led by Wolfgang Schäuble and Olaf Scholz.

== Other activities ==
- Federal Financial Supervisory Authority (BaFin), Member of the Administrative Council (2002–2017)
- KfW, Member of the Board of Supervisory Directors (since 2003)
- Sparkasse Deggendorf, Member of the supervisory board (since 1998)
- German Transport Infrastructure Financing Company (VIFG), Member of the supervisory board (since 2009)
- Ifo Institute for Economic Research, Member of the Board of Trustees (since 1998)
- Southeast Europe Association (SOG), Vice President (1998–2006)

== Political positions ==
In June 2017, Kalb voted against Germany's introduction of same-sex marriage.

== Personal life ==
Kalb is a Roman Catholic; he is married and has two children.
