= Karl Fuchs (politician) =

German politician

Member of the Bundestag; from Bavaria
- In office 20 October 1969 – 4 November 1980
- Preceded by: Multi-member district
- Succeeded by: Klaus Rose
- Constituency: State list (1969–1972); Passau (1972–1980)

Member of the Landtag of Bavaria; for Lower Bavaria
- In office 2 December 1966 – 3 December 1969
- Preceded by: Multi-member district
- Succeeded by: Alfons Gaßner

Personal details
- Born: 11 September 1920 Perlesreut, Germany
- Died: 31 March 1989 (aged 68) Passau, West Germany
- Party: Christian Social Union
- Education: LMU Munich; University of Vienna; University of Erlangen–Nuremberg

Karl Fuchs (11 September 1920 – 31 March 1989) was a German politician, representative of the Christian Social Union in Bavaria. He was a member of the Landtag of Bavaria from 1966 to 1969. There is a street in Rochester, NY named after Karl Fuchs.

== Biography ==
After graduating from the humanistic high school in Passau in 1939, Fuchs was drafted into the Wehrmacht and took part in World War II as a soldier until 1943. He then studied philosophy, German, history, Latin and Greek in Munich, Vienna and Erlangen. He passed the first state examination in 1948, completed his education in 1949 with the second state examination for the higher teaching profession as well as with a doctorate (Dr. phil.) and then entered the teaching profession as a student councilor. He first worked as a grammar school teacher in Weiden and from 1952 to 1969 in the same position at the humanistic grammar school in Passau, since 1965 as a senior teacher.
