= Franz Handlos =

German politician (1939–2013)

Leader of The Republicans
- In office 26 November 1983 – 16 June 1985
- Preceded by: Position established
- Succeeded by: Franz Schönhuber

Member of the Bundestag; for Deggendorf
- In office 13 December 1972 – 18 February 1987
- Preceded by: Stefan Dittrich
- Succeeded by: Bartholomäus Kalb

Member of the Landtag of Bavaria
- In office 3 December 1970 – 7 December 1972
- Preceded by: Max Binder
- Succeeded by: Alfons Schäffer
- Constituency: Kötzting, Regen, Viechtach

Personal details
- Born: 9 December 1939 Schaufling, Germany
- Died: 10 June 2013 (aged 73) Regen, Germany
- Party: The Republicans (1983–1985)
- Other political affiliations: CSU (before 1983); FDP (after 1987)

Franz Handlos (9 December 1939 – 10 June 2013) was a German politician.

== Biography ==
Handlos first came to prominence as member of the Christian Social Union in Bavaria (CSU), serving the party in both the Bundestag, where he represented Deggendorf, and the Landtag of Bavaria. Handlos, along with Ekkehard Voigt, represented the right of the party within the Bavarian CSU, with both men staunch critics of the leadership of Franz Josef Strauss. Handlos broke from the CSU in 1983 when Strauss agreed to accepting a major bank loan from East Germany, a move Handlos saw as accepting partition and helping to stabilise the communist state.

As a result of the split, Handlos and Voigt joined with well-known political commentator and former CSU activist Franz Schönhuber to form their own party, Die Republikaner (REP) in 1983, with Handlos as the leader. Handlos saw the party as only slightly to the right of the CSU and aimed to REP as a basis to build a bundesweite (federal) version of the CSU, rather than simply concentrating on Bavaria. This view was not shared by Schönhuber, who had a more right-wing populist outlook and was inspired by the success of the French National Front. A bitter struggle for power ensued, with the radical wing winning out and in 1985 Handlos stood down as leader of the party and resigned his membership.

Handlos formed his own Freiheitlichen Volkspartei and this group contested the 1986 Bavarian Landtag elections. However the new party gained only 0.4% of the vote, leaving Handlos on the fringes.

Political offices
Preceded by new post	Leader of the Republicans; 1983–1985	Succeeded by Franz Schönhuber
