= Johann Georg Koller =

German politician (born 1971)

Johann Georg Koller MdB

Member of the Bundestag; for Passau
- Incumbent
- Assumed office 25 March 2025
- Preceded by: Andreas Scheuer

Personal details
- Born: 15 July 1971 (age 55) Passau, West Germany
- Party: Christian Social Union
- Website: www.hans-koller.de

Johann (Hans) Georg Koller (born 15 July 1971) is a German politician from the Christian Social Union in Bavaria. He was elected to the Bundestag in the 2025 German federal election when he was a direct candidate in the constituency of Passau.
