= Johannes Schätzl =

German politician

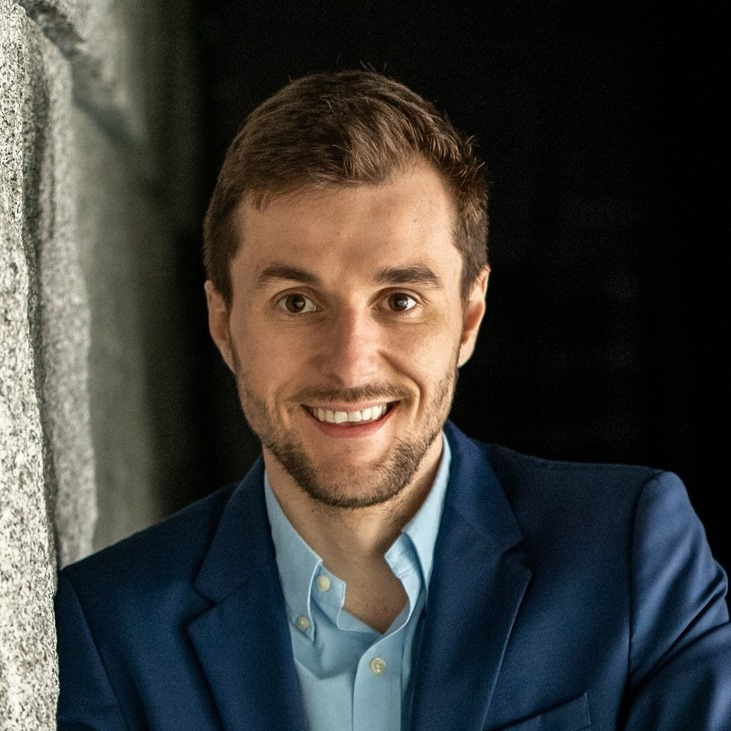

Member of the Bundestag
- Incumbent
- Assumed office 2021

Personal details
- Born: 10 June 1993 (age 33) Hutthurm, Germany
- Party: SPD
- Education: University of Passau

Johannes Schätzl (born 10 June 1993) is a German politician of the Social Democratic Party (SPD) who has been serving as a member of the Bundestag since 2021.

== Political career ==
Schätzl was elected to the Bundestag in 2021, representing the Passau district. In parliament, he now serves on the Committee on Digital Affairs and the Committee on Food and Agriculture. In this capacity, he is his parliamentary group's rapporteur on the Freedom of Information Act.

== Other activities ==
- Federal Network Agency for Electricity, Gas, Telecommunications, Post and Railway (BNetzA), Member of the Advisory Board (since 2022)
