= Muhanad Al-Halak =

German politician (born 1989)

- مهند الحلاق
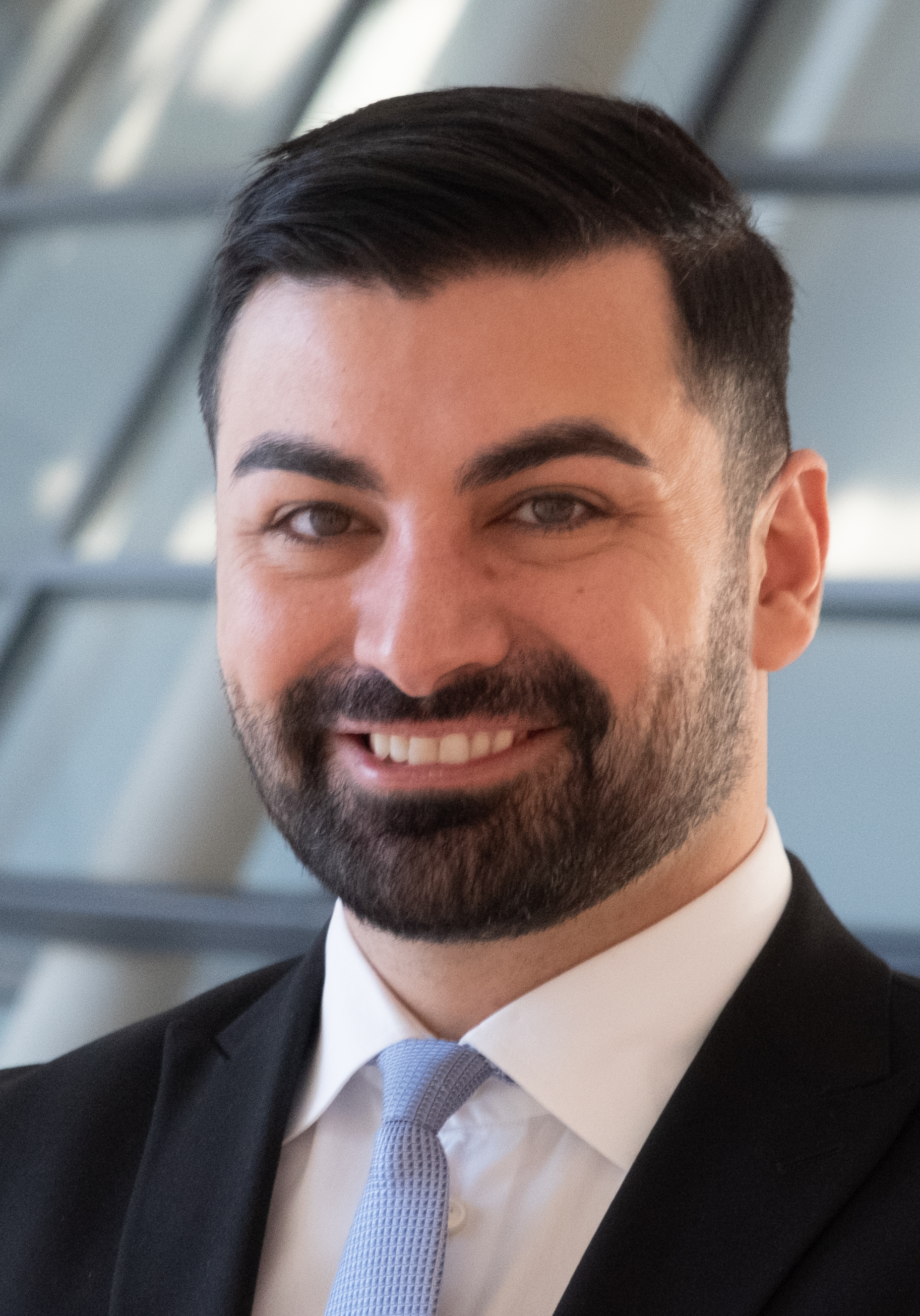
- Al-Halak in 2022

Member of the Bundestag
- In office 26 October 2021 – 25 March 2025
- Constituency: Bavaria FDP list

Personal details
- Born: July 31, 1989 (age 37) Diyala Governorate, Iraq
- Citizenship: Germany
- Party: FDP
- Occupation: Politician

Muhanad Al-Halak (Arabic: مهند الحلاق, born 31 July 1989 in Diyala, Iraq) is a German politician of the Free Democratic Party (FDP) who served as a member of the German Bundestag from 2021 to 2025.

== Early life and profession ==
Al-Halak was born in Iraq, and came to Germany with his family as asylum seekers in 2001 as an eleven-year-old child, settling in Grafenau in Bavaria. He and his parents applied for asylum, which was granted after a lengthy process. From 2001 to 2006, he attended the Propst-Seyberer secondary school and graduated with a qualifying secondary school certificate. He worked in public service for the town of Grafenau from 2006 until he became a member of the Bundestag. After initially training as a wastewater technology specialist with the town until 2009, he trained as a certified wastewater foreman at the BVS Lauingen master school from 2010 to 2012. From 2012 to December 2020, Al-Halak worked as operations manager for wastewater disposal, where he was responsible for the municipality's drainage management and for the safety of the wastewater treatment plants and the sewer network. He has the right to return to his position if his work as a deputy comes to an end.

== Political career ==
After meeting Christian Lindner at a public event, Al-Halak joined the FDP in 2016. From 2017 to July 2020, he was deputy district chairman of the FDP Freyung-Grafenau. He was an unsuccessful candidate in the 2019 European Parliament election in Germany and came in list position 52. In the 2020 local elections, he ran for mayor of the town of Grafenau in the first round of voting but was unable to qualify for the subsequent run-off election. However, he was the only representative of his party to win a seat on the Grafenau town council and was elected to the district council of the Freyung-Grafenau district. He has been the FDP district chairman since July 2020 and an advisor to the FDP Lower Bavaria district executive since September.

=== Member of the German Parliament, 2021–2025 ===
In the 2021 German federal election Al-Halak contested the constituency of Deggendorf and came in 6th place. He was elected on the state list. He received 5% of the vote in the constituency and, therefore, missed out on the direct mandate. As the FDP Bavaria won 14 seats, he was elected to the 20th German Bundestag.

In parliament, Al-Halak served on the Committee on the Environment, Nature Conservation, Nuclear Safety, and Consumer Protection and the Parliamentary Advisory Board on Sustainable Development. In addition to his committee assignments, he was also a member of the Parliamentary Friendship Group for Relations with Arabic-Speaking States in the Middle East, which is in charge of maintaining inter-parliamentary relations with Bahrain, Iraq, Yemen, Jordan, Qatar, Kuwait, Lebanon, Oman, Saudi Arabia, Syria, United Arab Emirates, and the Palestinian territories.

In August 2024 Al-Halak revealed his financial status in an interview. He stated, that after the usual expenses and having to pay for financing the acquisition of an apartment and some real estate, he had a monthly debit balance of €2,000 while earning €11,227.20 a month as a member of parliament, plus an allowance for expenditures of €5051.54.

== Memberships ==
Al-Halak is a member of the Digital Advisory Board of the Federal Consumer Centre.

== Private life ==
Al-Halak is single. Like the rest of his family, he took German citizenship.

== Other activities ==
- German Foundation for Consumer Protection (DSV), Member of the Board of Trustees (since 2022)
