= Brunhilde Irber =

German politician

Brunhilde Irber née Klessinger (born 27 July 1948 in Pleinting, Vilshofen an der Donau) is a German politician (SPD).

== Life and career ==
After Mittlere Reife in 1964, Brunhilde Irber initially began an apprenticeship as a child carer and housekeeper, but then moved to the District Office in 1965. Vilshofen, where she trained as an administrative assistant. She worked in this profession at the Vilshofen district office until 1968, at the Osterhofen district hospital from 1968 to 1970 and at the town of Osterhofen from 1970 to 1992. From 1982 to 1991, she was head of the culture and tourism office. In 1992, she began training as a foreign language correspondent, which she completed in 1994.

Brunhilde Irber is married and has one son.

== Party ==
She has been a member of the SPD since 1971 and was chairwoman of the SPD district association Deggendorf from 1990 to 1993. From 1993 until 2009 she was chairwoman of the SPD sub-district Deggendorf/Freyung-Grafenau and since 2000 also of the SPD district Niederbayern.

== Member of Parliament ==
Brunhilde Irber was a member of the district council of the district of Deggendorf from 1978 to 2005 and of the town council of Osterhofen from 1990 to 2005.

From 1994 to 2009 she was a member of the German Bundestag. She was a member of the Committee on Tourism and the Committee on Foreign Affairs. From November 1998 to January 2005, Brunhilde Irber was spokesperson for the SPD Bundestag parliamentary group's working group on tourism. She is also the SPD parliamentary group's spokesperson on Africa policy. Since January 2005, she has been deputy chair of the Committee on Tourism. From December 2005 to mid-2007, she was a member of the executive committee of the SPD parliamentary group. On 29 June 2004, she was the addressee of a letter bomb from Johann Lang. However, the explosive device was discovered before the letter was opened and did not detonate.

Brunhilde Irber has always been elected via the State List Bavaria to the Bundestag. Her constituency was Deggendorf.

== Commitment to the free-flowing Danube ==
Brunhilde Irber is a founding member of the Parliamentary Group for Free-Flowing Rivers.

== Public offices ==
From 1996 to 2002 she was second mayor in the town of Osterhofen.

== Honours ==
- 2003 Municipal Medal of Merit in bronze
- 2005 Bavarian Order of Merit
- 2017 Municipal Medal of Merit in silver
- 2020 Honorary Citizenship of the town of Osterhofen
- 2021 Federal Cross of Merit on ribbon

== Literature ==
- Rudolf Vierhaus, Ludolf Herbst (ed.), Bruno Jahn (co-ed.): Biographisches Handbuch der Mitglieder des Deutschen Bundestages. 1949–2002. Vol. 1: A-M. K. G. Saur, Munich 2002, ISBN 3-598-23782-0.
