= Siegfried Susser =

German footballer (1953–2025)

Personal information
- Date of birth: 12 July 1953
- Place of birth: Vilshofen an der Donau, Bavaria, West Germany
- Date of death: 18 November 2025 (aged 72)
- Height: 1.80 m (5 ft 11 in)
- Position: Forward

Senior career*
Years	Team	Apps	(Gls)
1977–1978	1. FC Nürnberg	32	(6)
1978–1979	SC Freiburg	17	(8)
1979–1980	1. FC Nürnberg	22	(8)
1980–1983	Stuttgarter Kickers	93	(15)
1983–1984	Strasbourg	34	(3)
1984–1987	SpVgg Fürth		
- * Club domestic league appearances and goals

Siegfried Susser (12 July 1953 – 18 November 2025) was a German professional footballer who played as a forward. He died on 18 November 2025, at the age of 72.
