= Vilshofen an der Donau =

- Town
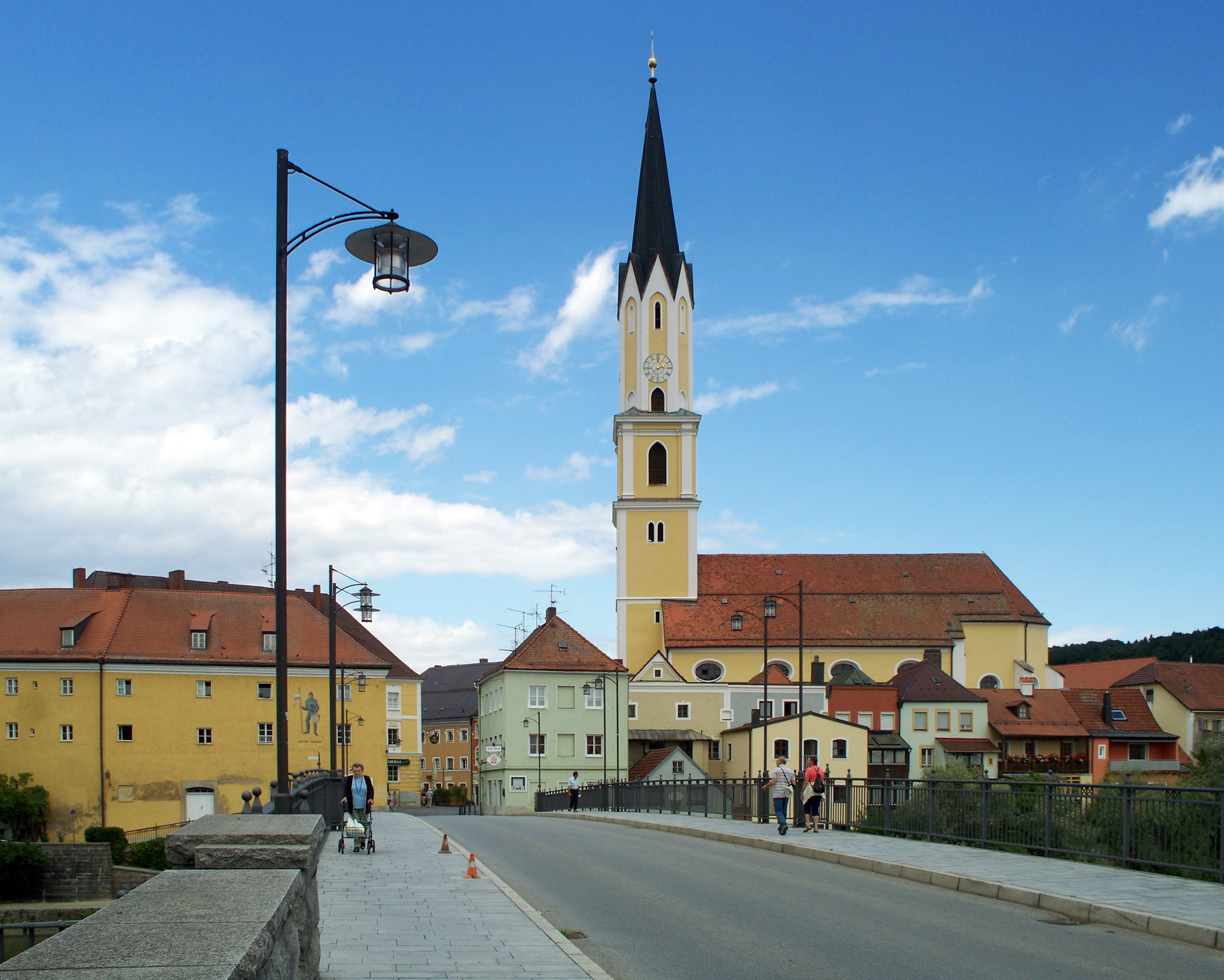
- Bridge over the river Vils and the parish church

- Coat of arms

- Location of Vilshofen an der Donau within Passau district
- Interactive map of Vilshofen an der Donau
- Location within Germany Location within Bavaria
- Coordinates: 48°38′00″N 13°11′14″E
- Country: Germany
- State: Bavaria
- Admin. region: Niederbayern
- District: Passau

Government
  - Mayor (2020–26): Florian Gams (SPD)

Area
  - Total: 86.29 km^{2} (33.32 sq mi)
- Elevation: 308 m (1,010 ft)

Population (2025-12-31)
  - Total: 18,184
  - Density: 210.7/km^{2} (545.8/sq mi)
- Time zone: UTC+01:00 (CET)
  - Summer (DST): UTC+02:00 (CEST)
- Postal codes: 94474
- Dialling codes: 08541, 08548, 08549
- Vehicle registration: PA
- Website: www.vilshofen.de

Vilshofen an der Donau (German pronunciation: [fɪlsˈhoːfn̩ ʔan deːɐ̯ ˈdoːnaʊ], lit. 'Vilshofen on the Danube') is the largest town in the southeast of Bavaria, Germany in the district of Passau. Until 1972, the town was the district seat of the district of Vilshofen.

== History ==
=== Middle Ages ===
The year 776 was the beginning of the documented history of Vilshofen. When a farm was donated to the Mondsee monastery (Salzkammergut), Vilusa (name of the farm) was mentioned for the first time. In the 12th century, the form of the name Vilshouen existed. Bishop of Passau was landlord of the Danube and Vils. Vilshofen was held by the Count of Ortenburg as a fief. In 1206, Vilshofen was elevated to a town by Count Heinrich I of Ortenburg. In 1220, there are already reports of a bridge over the Vils, which connects the new city area with the old settlement on the right bank of the Vils (today Vilsvorstadt). In 1236, Hainricus Plebanus de Vilshouen is mentioned as a pastor with a parish church.

In 1241, the town was taken over by Duke Otto II of Bavaria by force after an inheritance disputes in the House of Ortenburg. Therefore, it became a border town between the Duchy of Bavaria and the Prince-Bishopric of Passau. The "Vilshofener Zollhaus", can be found on the banks of the Danube. In 1258, Vilshofen became the center of a ducal nursing court. In 1262, the city finally passed to Bavaria after Duke Henry of Lower Bavaria, the successor of Otto II, negotiated a treaty with Bishop Rüdiger of Passau after lengthy negotiations. In 1345, Emperor Ludwig the Bavarian confirmed the town charter. In 1376, the collegiate monastery of Vilshofen was founded. In 1434, the oldest city seal was created with a raised quatrefoil with an angel as a shield holder and with the city coat of arms in a semicircular shield. In 1504, the town was successfully defended against the attacking Palatinates and Bohemia in the Landshut War of Succession. In 1536, 36 houses were destroyed by a large city fire.

=== 21st century ===
In 2002 the town completed a promenade along the Danube together with the Marienbrücke road bridge, and added a landing stage for river cruise vessels. The municipality's official name was subsequently changed from Vilshofen to Vilshofen an der Donau. In 2006 the town marked the 800th anniversary of its elevation to town status.

== Geography ==
=== Rivers ===
Vilshofen an der Donau is located at the confluence of the stream Vils, Pfudrach and Wolfach, south of the Bavarian Forest, a good 20 kilometers upstream of Passau. Due to these streams flowing into the Danube, the city is also called the three-river city, while the city of Passau serves as a model. The north–south extension of the urban area is about 6 km and the east–west extension about 10 km. The elevation above sea level ranges from 309 to 457 m above sea level.

=== Geomorphology and Geology ===
The village is located directly at the mouth of the Vils into the Danube. The Danube cut into the crystalline basement here during the uplift of the Bavarian Forest in the Late Tertiary and Quaternary. The result was the formation of an antecedent breakthrough valley. In this case, the river actively cuts into the rising mountain body, keeping pace with the tectonic uplift. The Danube thus created an impressive river valley from Vilshofen far beyond Passau. The depth of the breakthrough valley in the Passau area is about 100 m and rises to up to 180 m (Schlögener Schlinge, Upper Austria). Granite was mined in the Vils-Engtal nature reserve, which was stopped in the middle of the 20th century for economic reasons. The quarries were left to nature and partly flooded, so for example the Taferlsee was created, which can now be found in a natural environment and is an impressive example of anthropogenetic geomorphology.

=== Climate ===
The city area is located at 48° north latitude. As a result, the city is predominantly under the influence of air currents from the west. As can be seen from the climatic diagram, Vilshofen can be assigned to the cool temperate climate. There is also a continental impact and is characterized by sometimes very cold and snowy winters and hot and dry summers. The occurrence of heat thunderstorms is also present in the summer time.

The driest months are October and November with about 50 mm of precipitation. The occurrence of an Indian summer is therefore given annually and leads to mild temperatures in the late year.

Due to its location in the Danube plain at the confluence of the two rivers Danube and Vils, fog and high fog often form, especially in spring and autumn. The balancing influence on climate fluctuations, especially in winter, is also noticeable in Vilshofen in the fact that it is always 1–2 °C warmer in the urban area than in districts that are further away from the rivers due to the Danube and Vils rivers.

=== Neighbouring Municipalities ===
The municipalities of Aidenbach, Aldersbach, Beutelsbach, Künzing, Windorf, Ortenburg, Hofkirchen and Fürstenzell and the independent city of Passau border directly on the city area.

== Demographics ==
Religion

The population of Vilshofen is predominantly Christian. In Vilshofen there is a Catholic Church, a Protestant Church and a New Apostolic Church. 63% identify as Catholic, 7% as Protestant and 30% have no or other religious affiliation. There are two Roman Catholic parishes in the city area, in addition to the parish of St John the Baptist in Vilshofen and the parish of Sandbach. Both belong to the Deanery of Vilshofen and the Diocese of Passau. There is also the Benedictine monastery of Schweiklberg, which was only founded in 1904.

The Protestant parish celebrates its services in the Church of the Redeemer, which was built in 1937. The New Apostolic Church was completed in 1969.

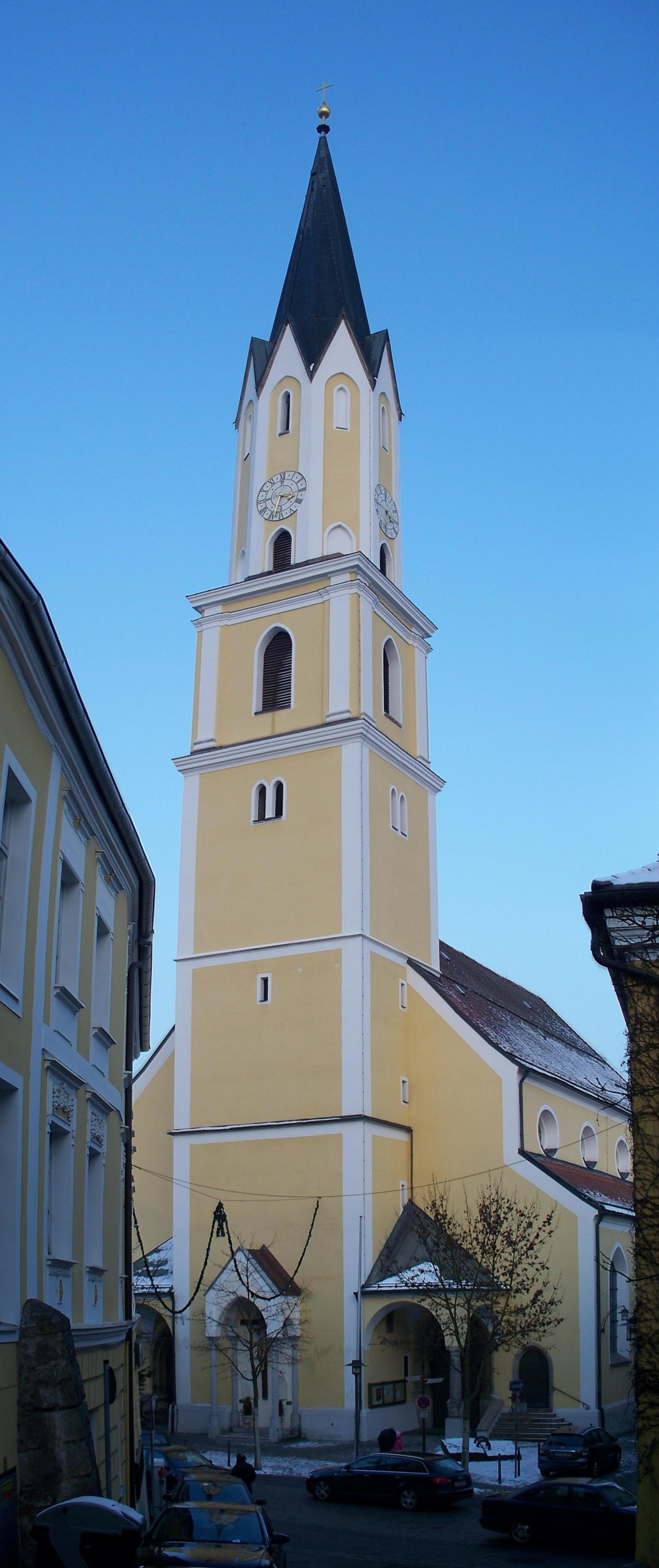
Parish Church of St John the Baptist

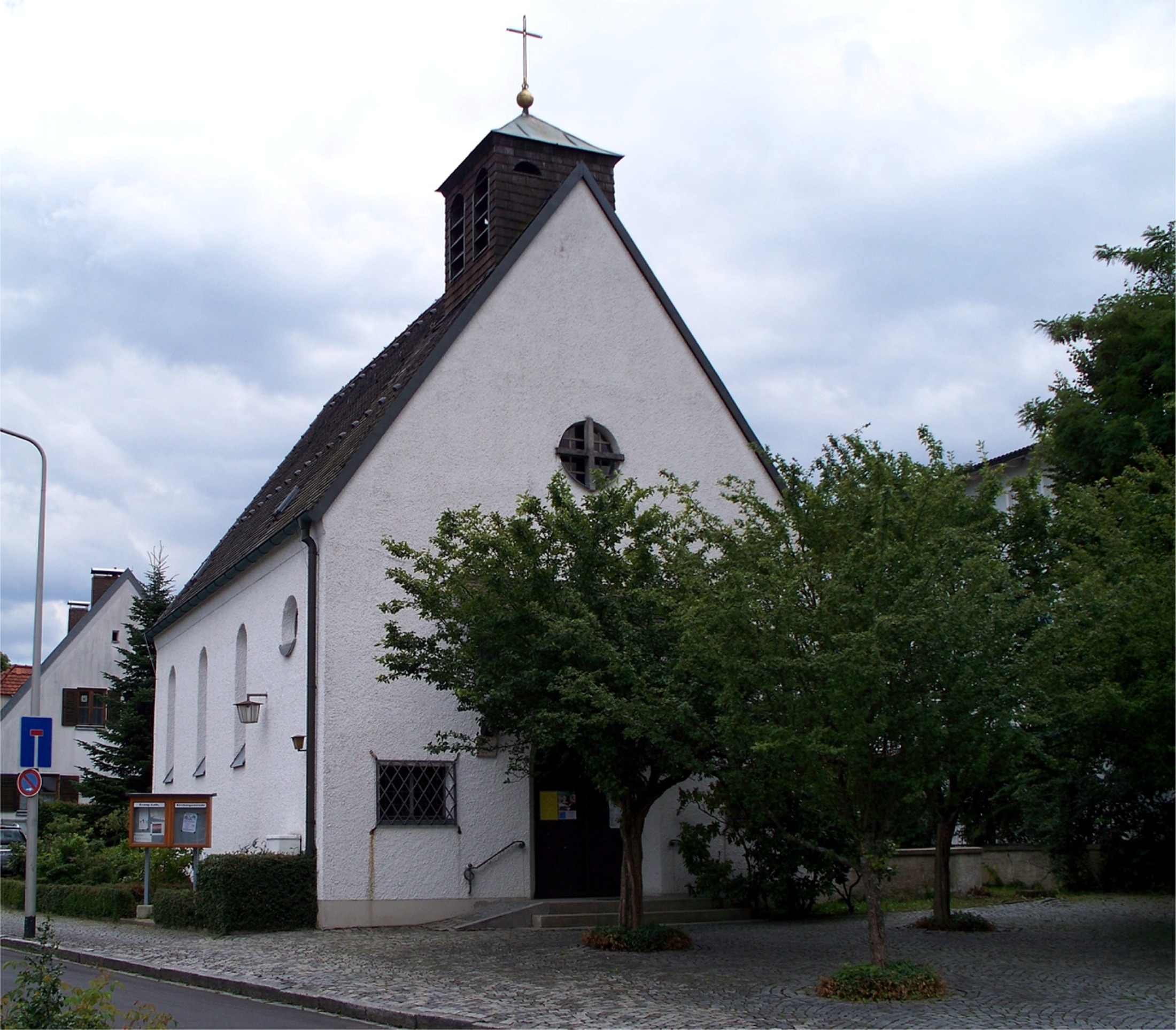
Evangelical Church of the Redeemer

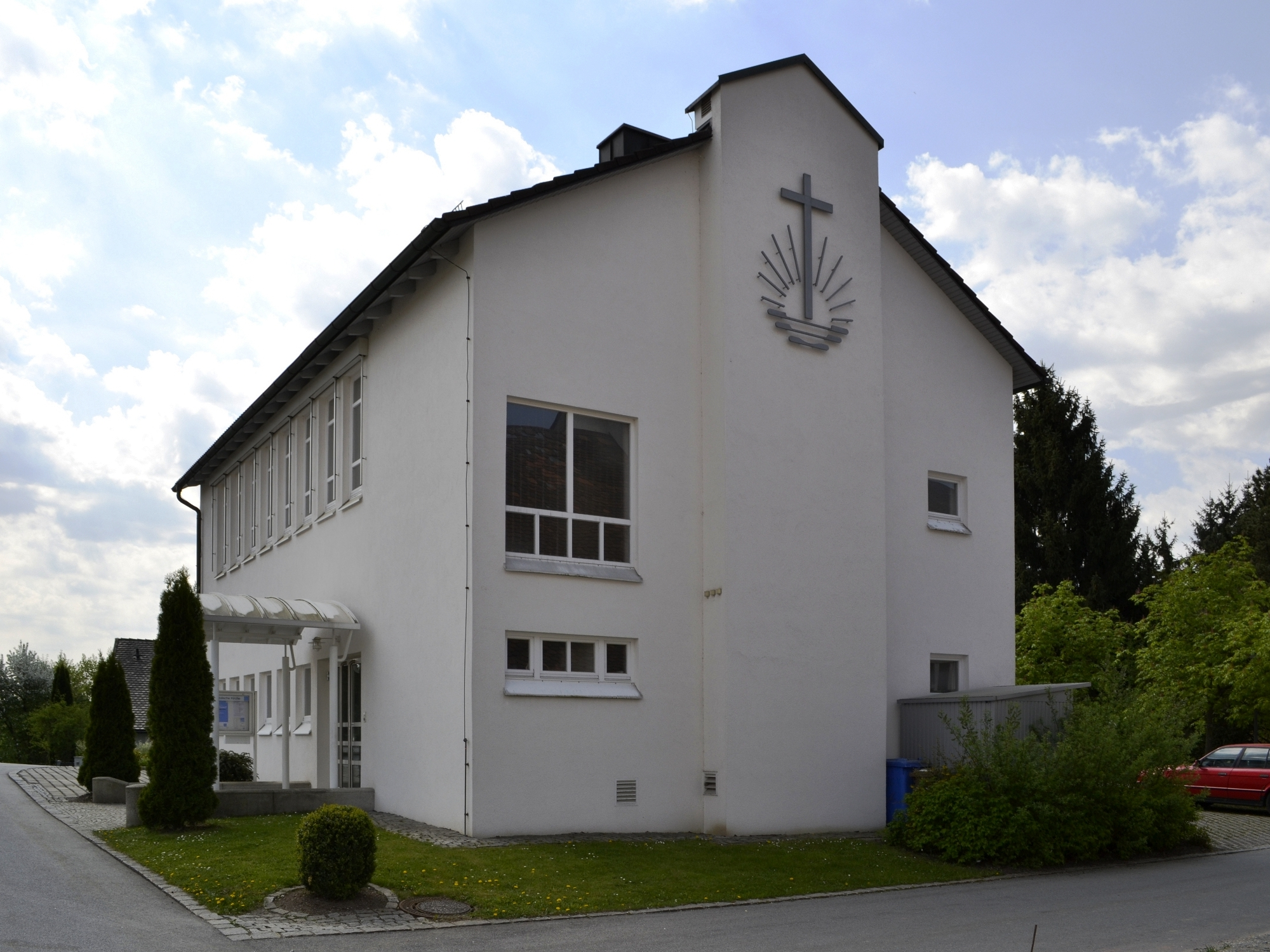
New Apostolic Church

== Tourism ==
Vilshofen lies on the Danube Cycle Path and is a port of call for Danube river cruise vessels. Since 1998 the town has been part of a tourism association with neighbouring municipalities along the Danube valley. Two riverside events have become its principal draws: the promenade festival Donau in Flammen, held annually since 2002 on the second weekend in July and centred on a firework display over the Danube, and a floating Christmas market, part of which is held aboard a moored vessel.

== Politics ==
The town council (24 seats) is composed since the 2020 Mayoral Election as follows:

List/Party	Seats	Percentage of votes
Christian Social Union in Bavaria (CSU)	6	23.84%
Social Democratic Party of Germany (SPD)	7	27.22%
Nonpartisan group (ÜW)	4	15.93%
Free Voters (FWG) / Alliance 90/The Greens (Grüne)	3	13.58%
Youth party (JL)	2	8.23%
Alternative for Germany (AfD)	1	5.27%
Freundekreis Hansi Brandl (FHB)	1	5.22%
Free Democratic Party (Germany) (FDP)	0	0.72%

With respect to 2014, the SPD gained two more seats, and for the first time AfD and FHB got a seat.

The voter affluence was 58.02%

Mayor

The first mayor is Florian Gams (SPD), who was elected in the run-off election on 30 March 2014 in the 2014 municipal election with 50.5% of the valid votes, after he had received only 23.36% in the first round of voting against the incumbent Georg Krenn (47.02%). Gams was confirmed in office for another six years on 15 March 2020 with 72.06% of the votes.

Georg Krenn was the successor to Mayor Hans Gschwendtner, who was First Mayor of the city from 1990 to 2008.

== People ==
- Josef Groll (1813-1887), brewer
- Josef Märkl (1928-2010), violinist, composer and music educator
- Ruth Drexel (1930-2009), actress and theatre director
- Brunhilde Irber (born 1948), politician
- Siegfried Susser (born 1953), footballer
- Andreas Kuffner (born 1987), rower
- Christoph Behr (born 1989), footballer
- Felix Wimberger (born 1990), rower
