= Stefan Dittrich =

German politician (1912–1988)

Member of the Bundestag; for Deggendorf
- In office 6 October 1953 – 13 December 1972
- Preceded by: Ludwig Volkholz
- Succeeded by: Franz Handlos

Member of the European Parliament; for West Germany
- In office 9 December 1965 – 14 February 1973

Personal details
- Born: 28 June 1912 Hof, Bavaria, Germany
- Died: 5 February 1988 (aged 75) Bad Kötzting, West Germany
- Party: Christian Social Union
- Education: LMU Munich
- Occupation: Soldier, politician
- Awards: Knight's Cross of the Iron Cross

Military service
- Allegiance: Nazi Germany
- Branch/service: Army
- Years of service: c. 1933–1945
- Rank: Major
- Unit: Artillerie-Regiment 46
- Battles/wars: World War II

Stefan Dittrich (28 June 1912 – 5 February 1988) was a German politician, who represented Deggendorf for the Christian Social Union of Bavaria. in the Bundestag.

== Awards ==
- Knight's Cross of the Iron Cross on 4 June 1944 as Oberleutnant of the Reserves and chief of the 4./leichtes Artillerie-Regiment 46

== See also ==
- List of Bavarian Christian Social Union politicians
