= Christoph Behr =

German footballer

Personal information
- Full name: Christoph Behr
- Date of birth: 21 March 1989 (age 37)
- Place of birth: Vilshofen, West Germany
- Height: 1.85 m (6 ft 1 in)
- Position: Forward

Team information
- Current team: ASCK Simbach am Inn
- Number: 26

Youth career
- –2005: FC Vilshofen
- 2005–2008: Wacker Burghausen

Senior career*
Years	Team	Apps	(Gls)
2007–2012	Wacker Burghausen II	73	(31)
2010–2012	Wacker Burghausen	19	(0)
2012–2013	TSV Buchbach	31	(5)
2013–2015	FC Alkofen	42	(16)
2015–	ASCK Simbach am Inn	71	(40)
- * Club domestic league appearances and goals as of 05:19, 14 October 2018 (UTC)

Christoph Behr (born 21 March 1989) is a German footballer who plays as a forward for ASCK Simbach am Inn.

== Career ==
Behr made his professional debut for Wacker Burghausen in the 3. Liga on 16 October 2010, starting the match before coming off in the 77th minute for Markus Grübl in the 2–0 away win against SV Babelsberg.
