= Andreas Scheuer =

German politician (born 1974)

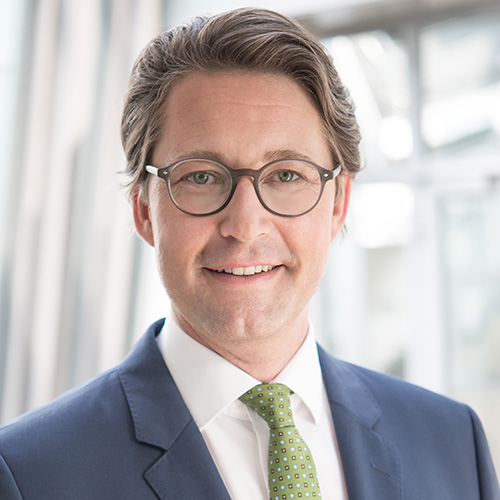
- Scheuer in 2017

Minister of Transport and Digital Infrastructure
- In office 14 March 2018 – 8 December 2021
- Chancellor: Angela Merkel
- Preceded by: Alexander Dobrindt; Christian Schmidt (acting)
- Succeeded by: Volker Wissing

Secretary General of the Christian Social Union
- In office 15 December 2013 – 14 March 2018
- Leader: Horst Seehofer
- Preceded by: Alexander Dobrindt
- Succeeded by: Markus Blume

Parliamentary Secretary of State for Transport, Building and Urban Development
- In office 18 October 2009 – 17 December 2013
- Chancellor: Angela Merkel
- Minister: Peter Ramsauer
- Preceded by: Karin Roth
- Succeeded by: Dorothee Bär

Member of the Bundestag; from Bavaria
- In office 17 October 2002 – 1 April 2024
- Preceded by: Multi-member district
- Succeeded by: Johann Georg Koller
- Constituency: State list (2002–2005); Passau (2005–2024)

Personal details
- Born: Andreas Franz Scheuer; 26 September 1974 (age 51) Passau, West Germany
- Party: Christian Social Union
- Spouses: Sabine Reisp (m. 2013; div. 2018); Julia Reuss (m. 2021)
- Children: 1
- Education: University of Passau

Andreas Franz Scheuer (born 26 September 1974) is a German politician of the Christian Social Union (CSU) party. From 2018 to 2021, he was Federal Minister of Transport and Digital Infrastructure in the Cabinet Merkel IV. From 2013 to 2018, he was Secretary General of the CSU. From 2009 to 2013, he was Parliamentary Secretary of State in the former Federal Ministry for Transport, Building and Urban Development in the Cabinet Merkel II. He was member of the German Bundestag from 2002 until 2024. In 2016, he was also elected district chairman of CSU Lower Bavaria, an office he held until 2023.

== Early life and education ==
Scheuer was born in Passau and completed high school there in 1994. In 1998, he completed his first state examination in teaching at junior high schools. Afterwards, he achieved a master's degree in political science, economics, and sociology at the University of Passau in 2001. In 2004, he completed a PhDr at Charles University Prague.

== Political career ==
=== Career in state politics ===
Scheuer has been a member of the CSU and the Junge Union (JU) since 1994. From 1997 to 2003, he was district chairman of the Junge Union Passau City. Between 1998 and 1999, he worked as adviser to Minister-President Edmund Stoiber of Bavaria.

=== Career in national politics ===
From 1999 to 2001, Scheuer served on the JU's national board. From 2001 to 2003 he was a member of the JU board in the state of Bavaria. In 2001, Scheuer was also elected to the CSU district executive Lower Bavaria, from 2003 to 2007 he was district chairman of JU Lower Bavaria. In the 2003 election he joined the CSU district board of Passau City. From 1998 to 1999, he was an employee of Bavarian Minister President Edmund Stoiber. In 2002, he was also elected to the Passau city council. He gave up that seat in October 2024.

=== Member of the German Parliament (2002–2024) ===
In 2009, Scheuer initiated a cross-party group for the protection of antique cars.

In the negotiations to form a Grand Coalition of Chancellor Angela Merkel's Christian Democrats (CDU together with the Bavarian CSU) and the Social Democrats (SPD) following the 2013 federal elections, Scheuer was part of the SPD delegation in the working group on transport, building and infrastructure, led by Peter Ramsauer and Florian Pronold.

In 2020, the Bundestag launched an inquiry about the minister's implication in autobahn toll affairs. The opposition parties in the Bundestag accuses Scheuer of breaking the law and making massive mistakes. Scheuer's ministry is said to have broken budgetary and public procurement law when concluding the multi-billion dollar contracts with the operators and "deliberately deceived" the Bundestag about the real costs of the car toll.

Since the 2021 elections, Scheuer has been serving on the Committee on European Affairs.

In May 2023, Scheuer drew criticism after he alongside fellow CSU MPs Dorothee Bär and Florian Hahn visited Florida to meet with Governor Ron DeSantis, due to DeSantis' perceived anti-LGBT stances.

In January 2024, Scheuer announced that he would not stand in the 2025 federal elections but instead resign from active politics by the end of the parliamentary term.

== Other activities ==
=== Corporate boards ===
- KfW, Ex-Officio Member of the Board of Supervisory Directors (2018–2021)
- Klinik Prof. Schedel GmbH, Member of the Advisory Board

=== Non-profit organizations ===
- Akademie für Politische Bildung Tutzing, Member of the Advisory Board
- German Deutsch-Tschechische und -Slowakische Gesellschaft (DTSG), Chairman
- Frischluft, Member of the Board of Trustees

In addition, Scheuer is a member of the broadcasting council of the German ZDF public television channel for the CSU party. In 2016 he demanded a "political aftermath" within the council because of the late reporting of the channel about the New Year's Eve sexual assaults in Germany.

== Political positions ==
In June 2017, Scheuer voted against Germany's introduction of same-sex marriage.

== Personal life ==
Scheuer was married to his first wife until 2011. He was later married to TV presenter Sabine Reisp from 2013 until 2018; the couple has a daughter. In August 2021 he married his girlfriend Julia Reuss.
