= Christian Flisek =

German politician (born 1974)

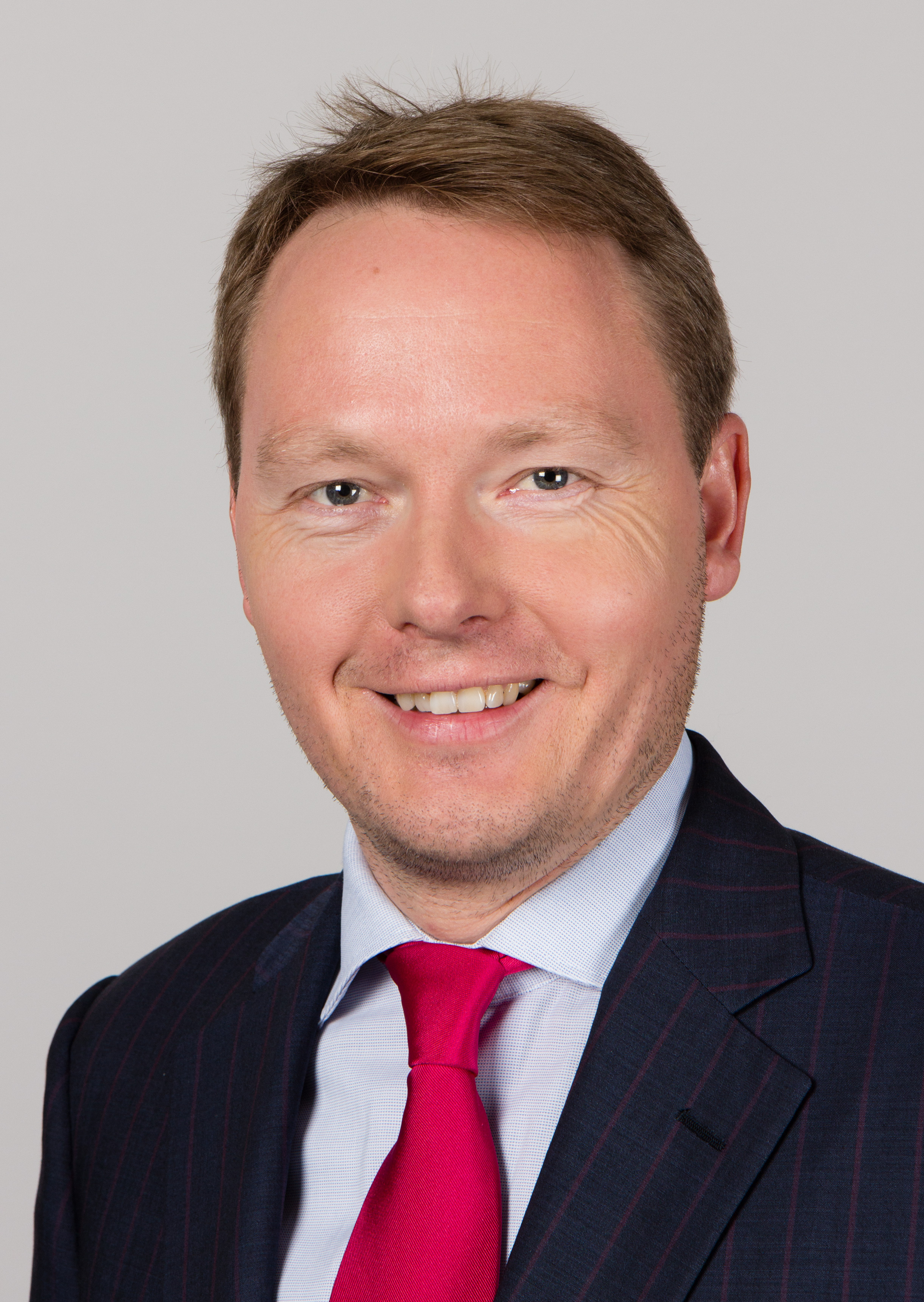
- Flisek in 2014

Member of the Bundestag
- In office 22 October 2013 – 24 October 2017
- Constituency: Bavaria

Personal details
- Born: 15 April 1974 (age 51) Bochum
- Party: Social Democratic Party (since 1990)

Christian Flisek (born 15 April 1974 in Bochum) is a German politician. From 2013 to 2017, he was a member of the Bundestag. From 2018 to 2023, he was a member of the Landtag of Bavaria.
