= Rita Hagl-Kehl =

German politician (born 1970)

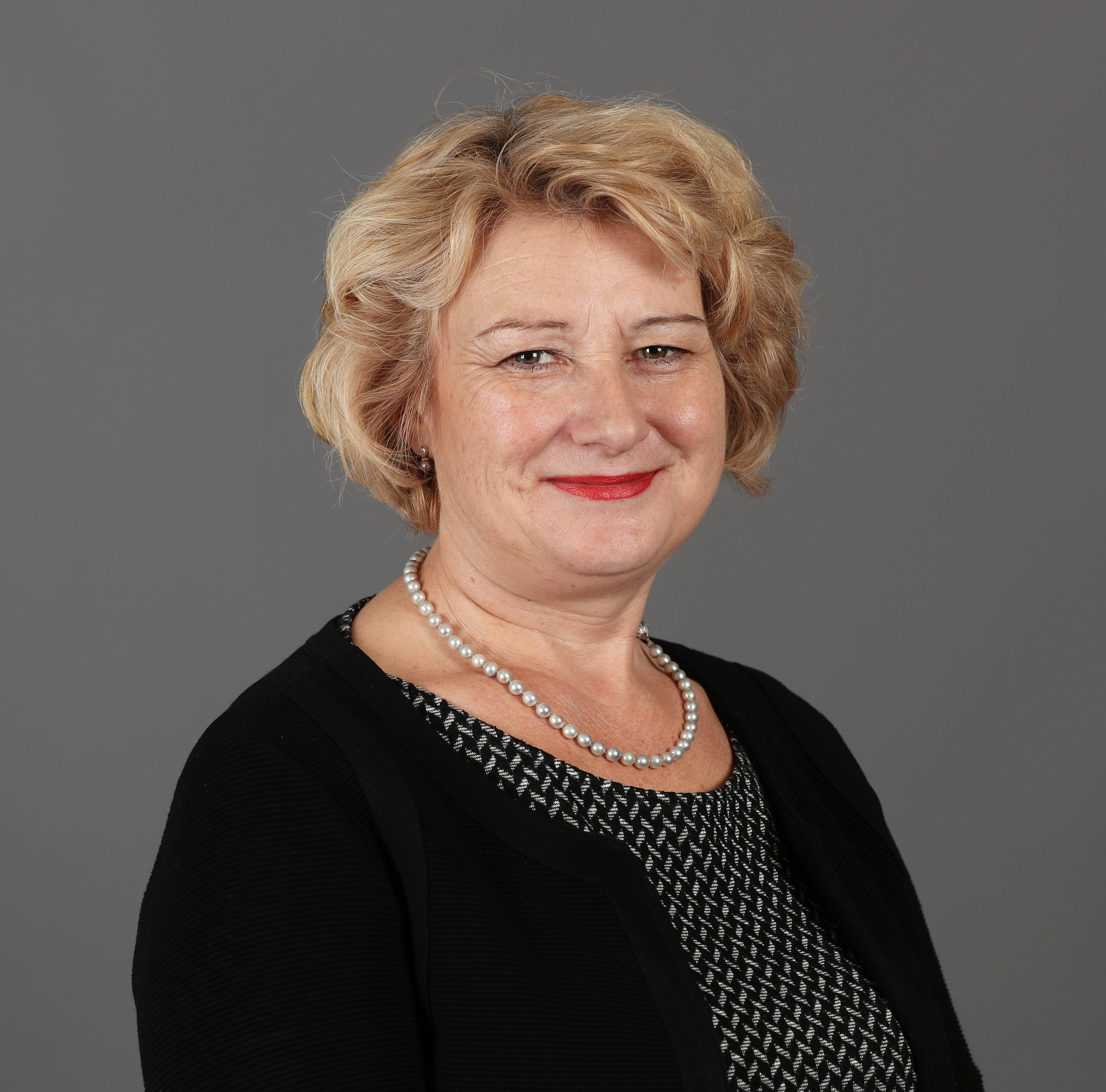
- Rita Hagl-Kehl in 2020

Member of the Bundestag
- Incumbent
- Assumed office 2013

Personal details
- Born: 11 November 1970 (age 55) Porz, West Germany (now Germany)
- Party: SPD
- Children: 4

Rita Hagl-Kehl (born 11 November 1970) is a German politician of the Social Democratic Party (SPD) who has been serving as a member of the Bundestag from the state of Bavaria since 2013. In addition to her parliamentary work, she served as Parliamentary State Secretary at the Federal Ministry of Justice and Consumer Protection in the government of Chancellor Angela Merkel from 2018 until 2021.

== Early career ==
Born in Porz, North Rhine-Westphalia, Hagl-Kehl worked as a teacher in Freyung from 2008 until 2013.

== Political career ==
Hagl-Kehl first became a member of the Bundestag in the 2013 German federal election. In parliament, she was a member of the Committee on Agriculture and the Committee on Transport and Digital Infrastructure from 2014 until 2017. In that capacity, she served as her parliamentary group's rapporteur on organic farming, pesticides, fertilisers, soil protection, water protection and sustainability. In addition to her committee assignments, she has been a member of the German-Egyptian Parliamentary Friendship Group since 2018.

From 2018 until 2021, Hagl-Kehl served as Parliamentary State Secretary for Justice and Consumer Protection, under minister Christine Lambrecht.

After leaving government following the 2021 elections, Hagl-Krehl joined the Committee on Agriculture and the Committee on Tourism again. She is also a member of the Parliamentary Advisory Board on Sustainable Development.

== Political positions ==
Within her parliamentary group, Hagl-Kehl belongs to the Parliamentary Left, a left-wing movement.
