= Eging am See =

Eging a.See
- Municipality
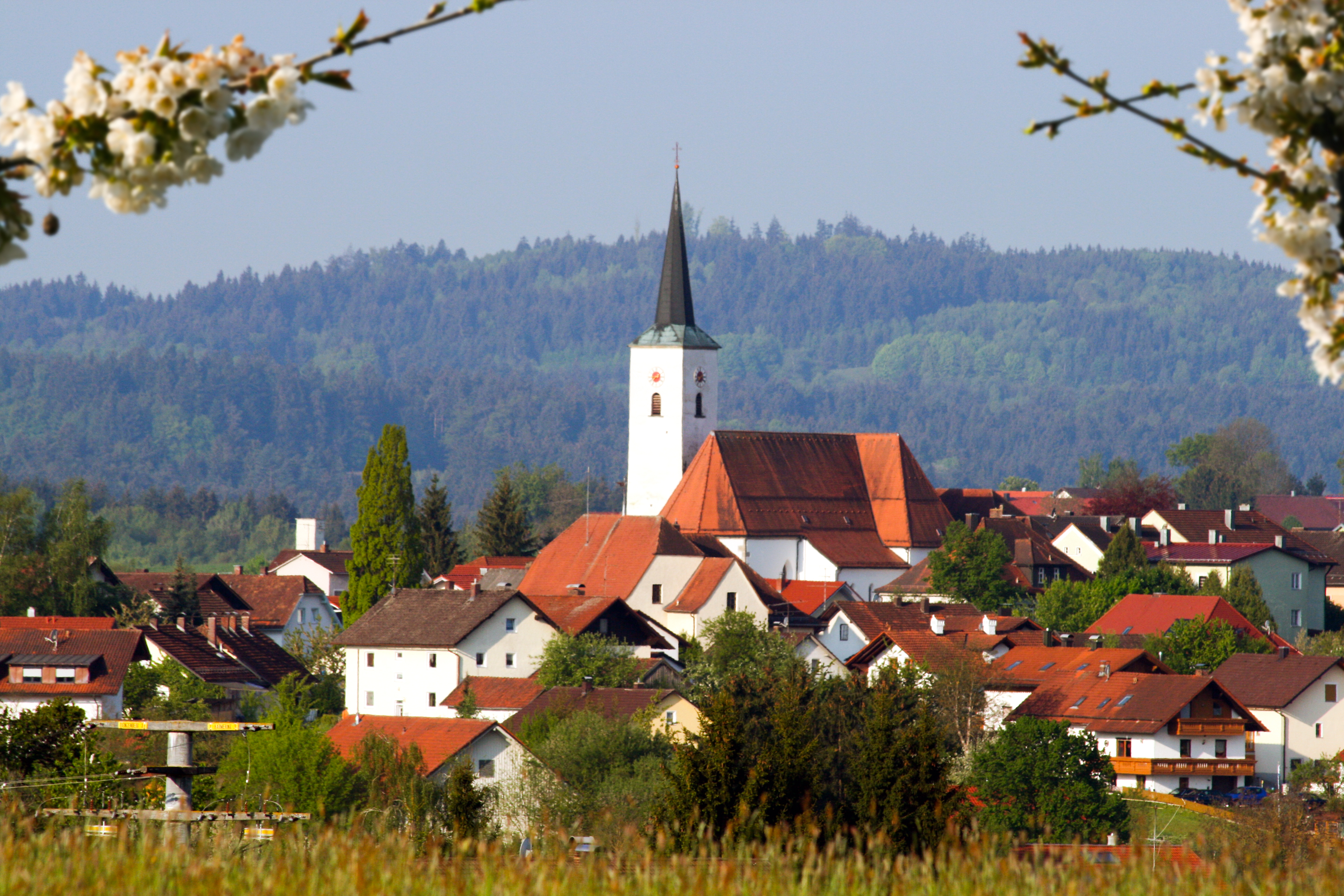
- Eging am See

- Coat of arms

- Location of Eging a.See within Passau district
- Interactive map of Eging a.See
- Location within Germany Location within Bavaria
- Coordinates: 48°43′N 13°16′E
- Country: Germany
- State: Bavaria
- Admin. region: Niederbayern
- District: Passau

Government
  - Mayor (2020–26): Walter Bauer

Area
  - Total: 23.66 km^{2} (9.14 sq mi)
- Elevation: 419 m (1,375 ft)

Population (2025-12-31)
  - Total: 4,136
  - Density: 174.8/km^{2} (452.8/sq mi)
- Time zone: UTC+01:00 (CET)
  - Summer (DST): UTC+02:00 (CEST)
- Postal codes: 94535
- Dialling codes: 08544
- Vehicle registration: PA
- Website: www.eging.de

Eging am See (German pronunciation: [ˈeːɡɪŋ ʔam ˈzeː], lit. 'Eging on the Lake') is a municipality in the district of Passau in Bavaria in Germany.
