= Fürstenstein =

- Municipality
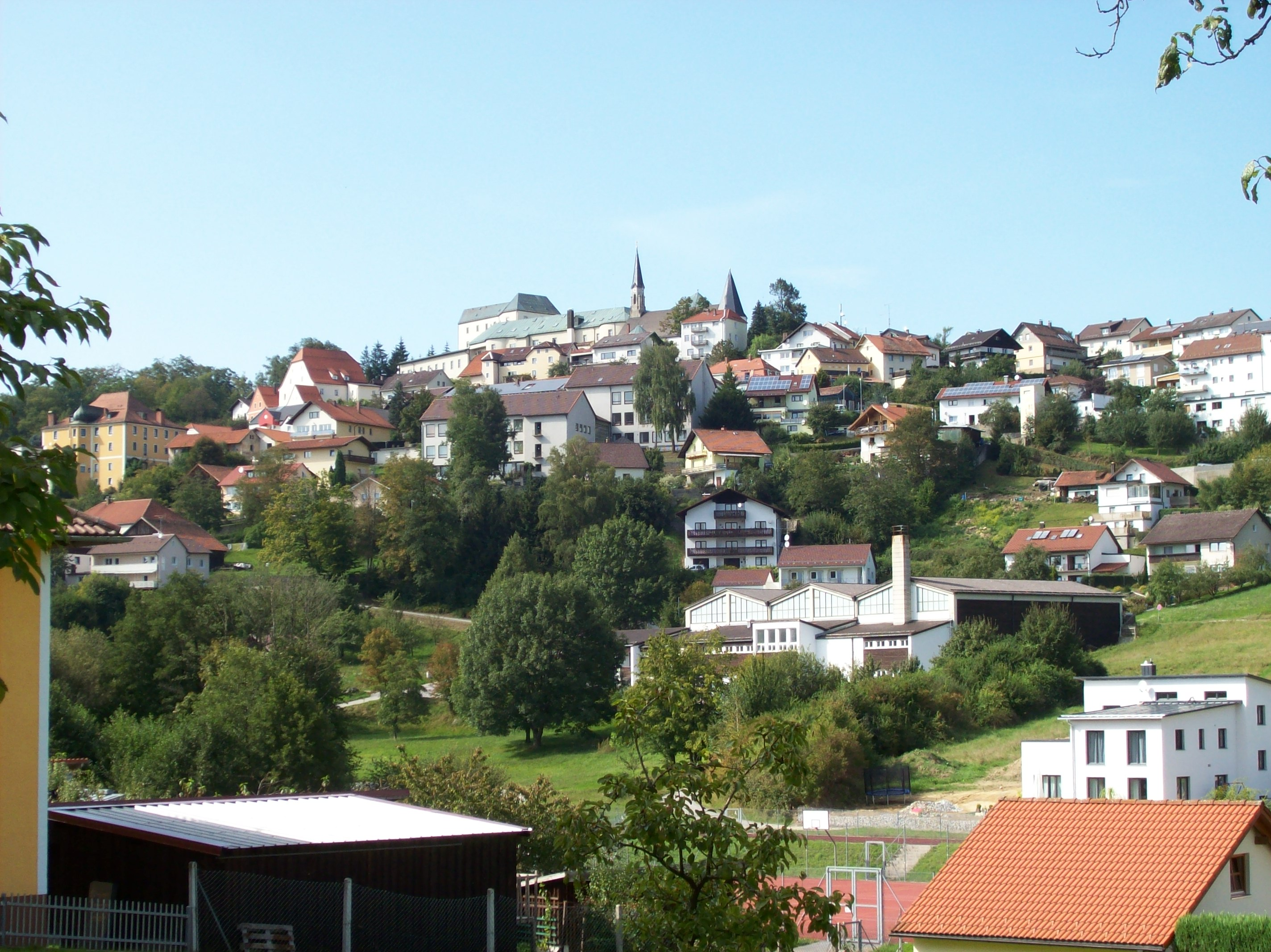
- General view of the town

- Coat of arms

- Location of Fürstenstein within Passau district
- Interactive map of Fürstenstein
- Location within Germany Location within Bavaria
- Coordinates: 48°43′N 13°20′E
- Country: Germany
- State: Bavaria
- Admin. region: Niederbayern
- District: Passau

Government
  - Mayor (2020–26): Stephan Gawlik (CSU)

Area
  - Total: 19.30 km^{2} (7.45 sq mi)
- Elevation: 577 m (1,893 ft)

Population (2025-12-31)
  - Total: 3,501
  - Density: 181.4/km^{2} (469.8/sq mi)
- Time zone: UTC+01:00 (CET)
  - Summer (DST): UTC+02:00 (CEST)
- Postal codes: 94538
- Dialling codes: 08504
- Vehicle registration: PA
- Website: fuerstenstein.de

Fürstenstein is a municipality in the district of Passau in Bavaria in Germany.
