= Aicha vorm Wald =

- Municipality
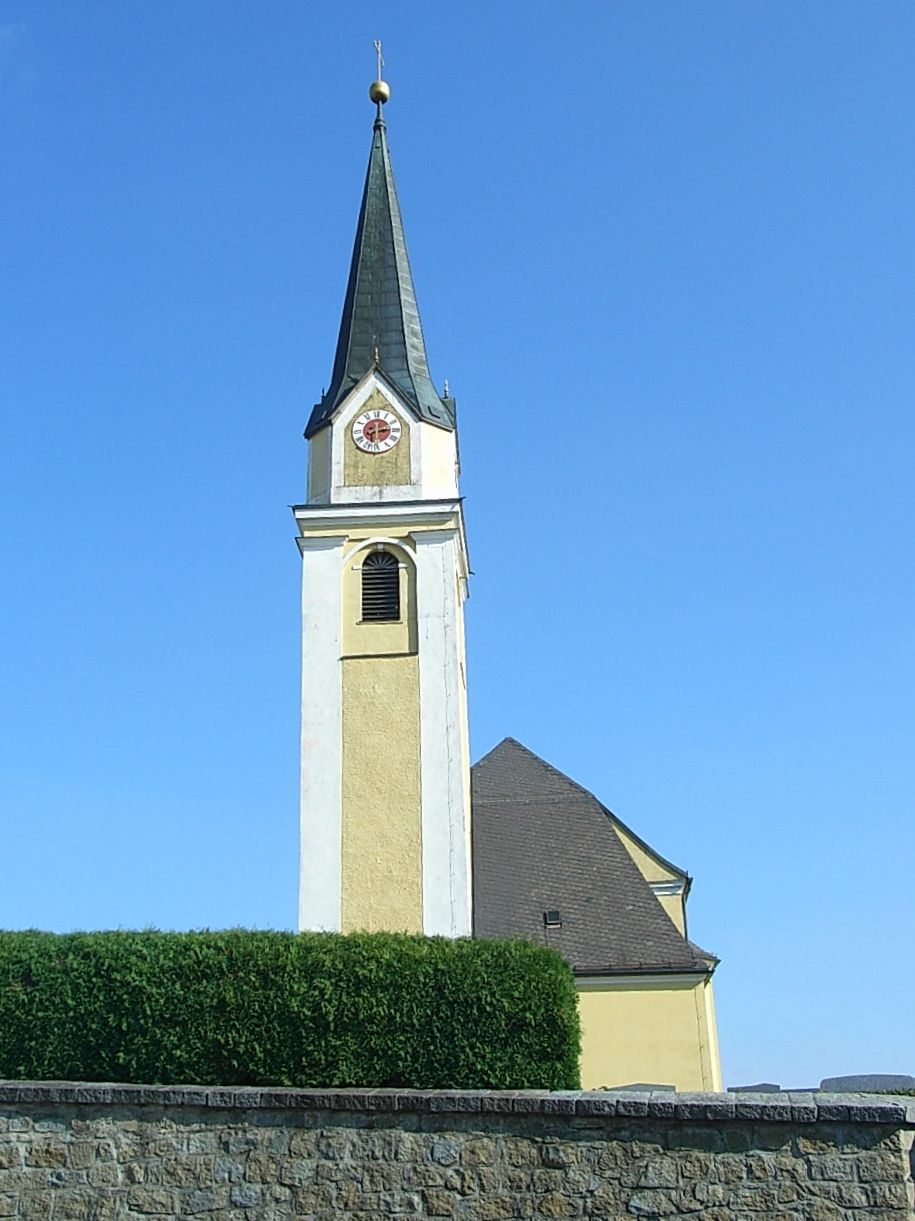
- Parish church of Saints Peter and Paul

- Coat of arms

- Location of Aicha vorm Wald within Passau district
- Interactive map of Aicha vorm Wald
- Location within Germany Location within Bavaria
- Coordinates: 48°40′25″N 13°17′28″E
- Country: Germany
- State: Bavaria
- Admin. region: Niederbayern
- District: Passau
- Subdivisions: 32 Ortsteile

Government
  - Mayor (2020–26): Georg Hatzesberger (CSU)

Area
  - Total: 20.32 km^{2} (7.85 sq mi)
- Elevation: 335–532 m (1,099–1,745 ft)

Population (2025-12-31)
  - Total: 2,477
  - Density: 121.9/km^{2} (315.7/sq mi)
- Time zone: UTC+01:00 (CET)
  - Summer (DST): UTC+02:00 (CEST)
- Postal codes: 94529
- Dialling codes: 08544
- Vehicle registration: PA
- Website: www.aichavormwald.de

Aicha vorm Wald (Central Bavarian: Aicha vorm Woid) is a municipality in the district of Passau in Bavaria in Germany.
