= Hofkirchen, Bavaria =

Hofkirchen
- Municipality
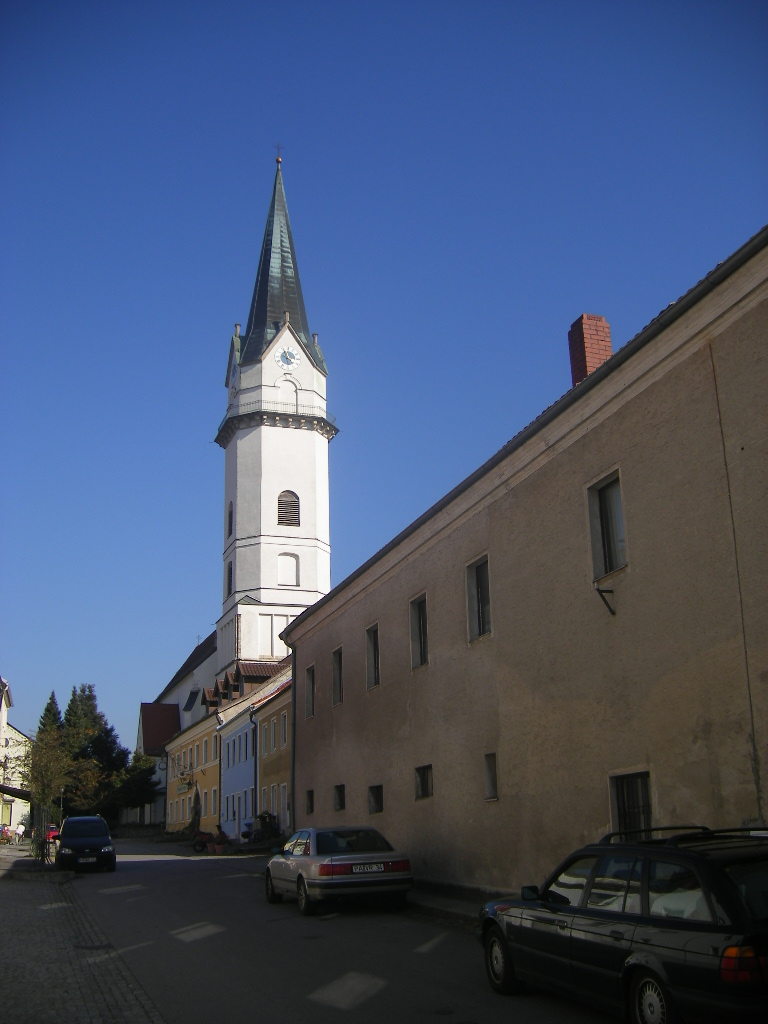
- Church of the Assumption of the Virgin Mary

- Coat of arms

- Location of Hofkirchen within Passau district
- Interactive map of Hofkirchen
- Location within Germany Location within Bavaria
- Coordinates: 48°41′N 13°7′E
- Country: Germany
- State: Bavaria
- Admin. region: Niederbayern
- District: Passau

Government
  - Mayor (2020–26): Josef Kufner (CSU)

Area
  - Total: 32.7 km^{2} (12.6 sq mi)
- Elevation: 309–525 m (1,014–1,722 ft)

Population (2025-12-31)
  - Total: 3,488
  - Density: 107/km^{2} (276/sq mi)
- Time zone: UTC+01:00 (CET)
  - Summer (DST): UTC+02:00 (CEST)
- Postal codes: 94544
- Dialling codes: 08545
- Vehicle registration: PA
- Website: www.hofkirchen.de

Hofkirchen (German pronunciation: [ˈhoːfkɪʁçn̩]; Central Bavarian: Hofkircha) is a municipality in the district of Passau in Bavaria in Germany.
