= Osterhofen =

- Town
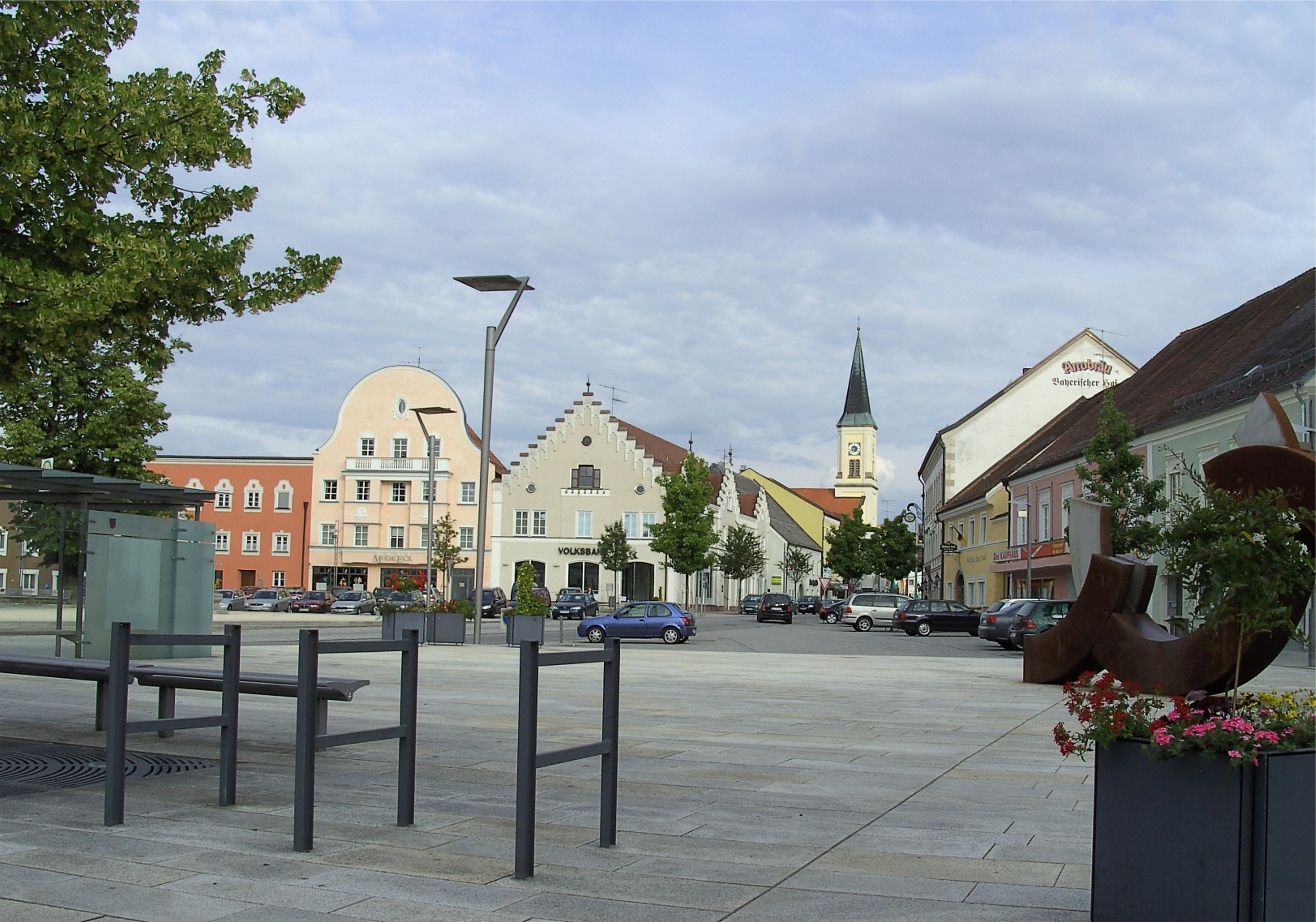
- Market square

- Coat of arms

- Location of Osterhofen within Deggendorf district
- Interactive map of Osterhofen
- Location within Germany Location within Bavaria
- Coordinates: 48°42′07″N 13°01′12″E
- Country: Germany
- State: Bavaria
- Admin. region: Niederbayern
- District: Deggendorf

Government
  - Mayor (2020–26): Liane Sedlmeier (FW)

Area
  - Total: 111.17 km^{2} (42.92 sq mi)
- Elevation: 318 m (1,043 ft)

Population (2025-12-31)
  - Total: 12,073
  - Density: 108.60/km^{2} (281.27/sq mi)
- Time zone: UTC+01:00 (CET)
  - Summer (DST): UTC+02:00 (CEST)
- Postal codes: 94486
- Dialling codes: 09932
- Vehicle registration: DEG
- Website: www.osterhofen.de

Osterhofen (German pronunciation: [oːstɐˈhoːfn̩]) is a town in the district of Deggendorf, in Bavaria, Germany. It is situated on the right bank of the Danube, 16 km south of Deggendorf.

The town surrounds Osterhofen Abbey, a former monastery, whose abbey church is now the Basilica of St. Margaretha.
